= Ohio's 7th House of Representatives district =

American legislative district

Ohio's 7th State House of Representatives district
Representative
Allison Russo; D–Upper Arlington
- Population (2020): 123,620

Ohio's 7th House of Representatives district is currently represented by Democrat Allison Russo. It is located entirely within Franklin County and includes the cities of Grandview Heights, Upper Arlington, and parts of Columbus.

== List of members representing the district ==
Member	Party	Years	General Assembly	Electoral history
District established January 2, 1967.
Bob Netzley (Laura)	Republican	January 2, 1967 – December 31, 1972	107th 108th 109th	Elected in 1966. Re-elected in 1968. Re-elected in 1970. Redistricted to the 81st district.
Ken Rocco (Parma)	Democratic	January 7, 1973 – December 31, 1982	110th 111th 112th 113th 114th	Elected in 1972. Re-elected in 1974. Re-elected in 1976. Re-elected in 1978. Re-elected in 1980. Retired.
Rocco Colonna (Brook Park)	Democratic	January 3, 1983 – December 31, 1992	115th 116th 117th 118th 119th	Redistricted from the 4th district and re-elected in 1982. Re-elected in 1984. Re-elected in 1986. Re-elected in 1988. Re-elected in 1990. Redistricted to the 18th district.
Ron Amstutz (Wooster)	Republican	January 4, 1993 – December 31, 2000	120th 121st 122nd 123rd	Redistricted from the 93rd district and re-elected in 1992. Re-elected in 1994. Re-elected in 1996. Re-elected in 1998. Term-limited; ran for state senator.
Jim Carmichael (Wooster)	Republican	January 1, 2001 – December 31, 2002	124th	Elected in 2000. Redistricted to the 3rd district.
Ed Jerse (Euclid)	Democratic	January 6, 2003 – December 13, 2004	125th	Redistricted from the 14th district and re-elected in 2002. Term-limited.
Kenny Yuko (Richmond Heights)	Democratic	January 3, 2005 – December 31, 2012	126th 127th 128th 129th	Elected in 2004; Re-elected in 2006. Re-elected in 2008. Re-elected in 2010. Term-limited.
Mike Dovilla (Berea)	Republican	January 7, 2013 – December 31, 2016	130th 131st	Redistricted from the 18th district and re-elected in 2012. Re-elected in 2014. Retired to run for state senator.
Tom Patton (Strongsville)	Republican	January 2, 2017 – December 31, 2022	132nd 133rd 134th	Elected in 2016. Re-elected in 2018. Re-elected in 2020. Redistricted to the 17th district.
Allison Russo (Upper Arlington)	Democratic	January 2, 2023 – present	135th	Redistricted from the 24th district and re-elected in 2022.
