= Ohio's 25th House of Representatives district =

American legislative district

Ohio's 25th State House of Representatives district
Representative
Cecil Thomas; D–Cincinnati
- Population (2020): 115,014

Ohio's 25th House of Representatives district is currently represented by Democrat Cecil Thomas. It is located entirely within Hamilton County and includes the municipalities of Norwood, St. Bernard, and part of Cincinnati.

== List of members representing the district ==
Member	Party	Years	General Assembly	Electoral history
District established January 2, 1967.
John Weis (Lancaster)	Republican	January 2, 1967 – December 31, 1968	107th	Elected in 1966. Lost re-election.
Don Maddux (Lancaster)	Democratic	January 6, 1969 – December 31, 1972	108th 109th	Elected in 1968. Re-elected in 1970. Redistricted to the 90th district.
James Rankin (Cincinnati)	Democratic	January 1, 1973 – June 28, 1978	110th 111th 112th	Redistricted from the 69th district and re-elected in 1972. Re-elected in 1974. Re-elected in 1976. Died.
Vacant		June 28, 1978 – September 14, 1978	112th	
Helen Rankin (Cincinnati)	Democratic	September 14, 1978 – December 31, 1992	112th 113th 114th 115th 116th 117th 118th 119th	Appointed to finish Rankin's term. Re-elected in 1978. Re-elected in 1980. Re-elected in 1982. Re-elected in 1984. Re-elected in 1986. Re-elected in 1988. Re-elected in 1990. Redistricted to the 30th district.
Jim Mason (Bexley)	Republican	January 4, 1993 – May 1, 1998	120th 121st 122nd	Elected in 1992. Re-elected in 1994. Re-elected in 1996. Retired to become Tenth District Court of Appeals judge.
Vacant		May 1, 1998 – May 12, 1998	122nd	
David Goodman (New Albany)	Republican	May 12, 1998 – October 2, 2001	122nd 123rd 124th	Appointed to finish Mason's term. Re-elected in 1998. Re-elected in 2000. Retired to become state senator.
Vacant		October 2, 2001 – October 10, 2001	124th	
Jim McGregor (Gahanna)	Republican	October 10, 2001 – December 31, 2002	124th	Appointed to finish Goodman's term. Redistricted to the 20th district.
Dan Stewart (Columbus)	Democratic	January 6, 2003 – December 31, 2010	125th 126th 127th 128th	Elected in 2002. Re-elected in 2004. Re-elected in 2006. Re-elected in 2008. Re-elected in 2010. Term-limited.
Michael Stinziano (Columbus)	Democratic	January 3, 2011 – December 31, 2012	129th	Elected in 2010. Redistricted to the 18th district.
Kevin Boyce (Columbus)	Democratic	January 7, 2013 – December 31, 2016	130th 131st	Redistricted from the 27th district and re-elected in 2012. Re-elected in 2014. Retired to run for Franklin County Commissioner.
Bernadine Kent (Columbus)	Democratic	January 2, 2017 – December 31, 2020	132nd 133rd	Elected in 2016. Re-elected in 2018. Retired.
Dontavius Jarrells (Columbus)	Democratic	January 4, 2021 – December 31, 2022	134th	Elected in 2020. Redistricted to the 1st district.
Cecil Thomas (Cincinnati)	Democratic	January 2, 2023 – present	135th	Elected in 2022.
