= Ohio's 18th House of Representatives district =

American legislative district

Ohio's 18th State House of Representatives district
Representative
Darnell Brewer; D–Cleveland
- Population (2020): 125,122

Ohio's 18th House of Representatives district is currently represented by Democrat Darnell Brewer. It is located entirely within Cuyahoga County and includes the cities of Garfield Heights, Maple Heights, and part of Cleveland.

== List of members representing the district ==
Member	Party	Years	General Assembly	Electoral history
District established January 2, 1967.
Kenneth Creasy (Delaware)	Republican	January 2, 1967 – December 31, 1972	107th 108th 109th	Elected in 1966. Re-elected in 1968. Re-elected in 1970. Retired.
John McCormack (Euclid)	Democratic	January 1, 1973 – December 31, 1974	110th	Elected in 1972. Retired to run for state senator.
Dennis E. Eckart (Euclid)	Democratic	January 6, 1975 – December 31, 1980	111th 112th 113th	Elected in 1974. Re-elected in 1976. Re-elected in 1978. Retired to run for U.S. Representative.
Ron Suster (Euclid)	Democratic	January 5, 1981 – December 31, 1982	114th	Elected in 1980. Redistricted to the 19th district.
Judy Sheerer (Shaker Heights)	Democratic	January 3, 1983 – December 31, 1992	115th 116th 117th 118th 119th	Elected in 1982. Re-elected in 1984. Re-elected in 1986. Re-elected in 1988. Re-elected in 1990. Retired; appointed to state senate.
Rocco Colonna (Brook Park)	Democratic	January 4, 1993 – May 12, 1998	120th 121st 122nd	Redistricted from the 7th district and re-elected in 1992. Re-elected in 1994. Re-elected in 1996. Resigned to become a member of the Ohio Liquor Commission.
Vacant		May 12, 1998 – June 23, 1998	122nd	
Erin Sullivan (Strongsville)	Democratic	June 23, 1998 – December 31, 2002	122nd 123rd 124th	Appointed to finish Colonna's term. Re-elected in 1998. Re-elected in 2000. Retired.
Tom Patton (Strongsville)	Republican	January 6, 2003 – November 18, 2008	125th 126th 127th	Elected in 2002. Re-elected in 2004. Re-elected in 2006. Resigned to become state senator.
Vacant		November 18, 2008 – December 31, 2008	127th	Colleen Grady was appointed to fill the vacancy created by Patton's resignation
Matt Patten (Strongsville)	Democratic	January 5, 2009 – December 31, 2010	128th	Elected in 2008. Lost re-election.
Mike Dovilla (Berea)	Republican	January 3, 2011 – December 31, 2012	129th	Elected in 2010. Redistricted to the 7th district.
Michael Stinziano (Columbus)	Democratic	January 7, 2013 – December 31, 2015	130th 131st	Redistricted from the 25th district and re-elected in 2012. Re-elected in 2014. Resigned to become Columbus City councillor.
Vacant		December 31, 2015 – January 26, 2016	131st	
Kristin Boggs (Columbus)	Democratic	January 26, 2016 – December 31, 2022	131st 132nd 133rd 134th	Appointed to finish Stinziano's term. Re-elected in 2016. Re-elected in 2018. Re-elected in 2020. Retired to run for Tenth District Court of Appeals judge.
Darnell Brewer (Cleveland)	Democratic	January 2, 2023 – present	135th	Elected in 2022.
