= 122nd Ohio General Assembly =

The One Hundred Twenty-second Ohio General Assembly was the legislative body of the state of Ohio in 1997 and 1998. In this General Assembly, both the Ohio Senate and the Ohio House of Representatives were controlled by the Ohio Republican Party. In the Senate, there were 21 Republicans and 12 Democrats. In the House, there were 60 Republicans and 39 Democrats. It used redistricted legislative districts from the 1990 United States census.

== Major events ==
=== Vacancies ===
- January 6, 1997: Senator Dennis Kucinich (D-23rd) resigns to take a seat in the United States House of Representatives.
- February 5, 1997: Senator Joseph Vukovich (D-33rd) resigns to take a seat on the Ohio 7th District Court of Appeals.
- February 5, 1997: Representative Ron Mottl (D-20th) resigns.
- February 8, 1997: Senator Jan Michael Long (D-17th) resigns to take a seat on the Probate Court of Pickaway County, Ohio.
- February 8, 1997: Representative Mike Shoemaker (D-91st) resigns to take a seat in the Ohio Senate.
- August 8, 1997: Representative Bill Thompson (R-1st) resigns to take a seat on the Ohio Industrial Commission.
- October 14, 1997: Representative Mike Fox (R-59th) resigns to become a Butler County, Ohio Commissioner.
- December 5, 1997: Senator Karen Gillmor (R-26th) resigns to become a member of the State Employment Relations Board.
- January 4, 1998: Representative Lloyd Lewis Jr. resigns to become City Commissioner of Dayton, Ohio.
- February 20, 1998: Senator Nancy Dix (R-31st) resigns.
- February 20, 1998: Representative Jay Hottinger (R-77th) resigns to become state Senator of the 31st District.
- May 1, 1998: Representative Jim Mason (R-25th) resigns to become a judge on the 10th District Court of Appeals.
- May 12, 1998: Representative Rocco Colonna (R-18th) resigns.
- September 16, 1998: Representative Frank Sawyer (D-79th) resigns due to health concerns.
- December 8, 1998: Representative Mike Verich (D-66th) resigns.
- December 16, 1998: Senator Jeffrey Johnson (D-21st) resigns.

=== Appointments ===
- January 6, 1997: Patrick Sweeney appointed to the 23rd Senatorial District due to the resignation of Senator Dennis Kucinich.
- February 5, 1997: Mike Shoemaker is appointed to the 17th Senatorial District due to the resignation of Senator Jan Michael Long.
- February 5, 1997: Ron Mottl is appointed to the 20th House District due to the resignation of Representative Ron Mottl.
- February 8, 1997: Bob Hagan is appointed to the 33rd Senatorial District due to the resignation of Senator Joseph Vukovich.
- February 8, 1997: Joseph P. Sulzer is appointed to the 91st House District due to the resignation of Mike Shoemaker
- August 8, 1997: John Willamowski is appointed to the 1st House District due to the resignation of Bill Thompson
- October 15, 1997: Greg Jolivette is appointed to the 59th House District due to the resignation of Mike Fox.
- December 5, 1997: Larry Mumper is appointed to the 26th Senatorial District due to the resignation of Senator Karen Gillmor.
- January 6, 1998: Dixie Allen is appointed to the 38th House District due to the resignation of Lloyd Lewis Jr.
- February 20, 1998: David R. Evans is appointed to the 77th House District due to the resignation of Jay Hottinger.
- February 20, 1998: Jay Hottinger is appointed to the 31st Senatorial District due to the resignation of Senator Nancy Dix.
- May 12, 1998: David Goodman is appointed to the 25th House District due to the resignation of Jim Mason.
- June 23, 1998: Erin Sullivan is appointed to the 18th House District due to the resignation of Rocco Colonna.
- September 16, 1998: William J. Hartnett is appointed to the 79th House District due to the resignation of Frank Sawyer.
- December 8, 1998: Chris Verich is appointed to the 66th House District due to the resignation of Mike Verich.

== Senate ==
=== Leadership ===
==== Majority leadership ====
- President of the Senate: Richard Finan
- President pro tempore of the Senate: Robert R. Cupp
- Assistant pro tempore: Eugene J. Watts
- Whip: Nancy Dix

==== Minority leadership ====
- Leader: Ben Espy
- Assistant Leader: Linda J. Furney
- Whip: Jeffrey Johnson
- Assistant Whip: Leigh Herington

=== Members of the 122nd Ohio Senate ===
District	Senator	Party	First elected
1	M. Ben Gaeth	Republican	1974
2	Bob Latta	Republican	1996
3	Bruce E. Johnson	Republican	1994 (Appt.)
4	Scott Nein	Republican	1995 (Appt.)
5	Rhine McLin	Democratic	1994
6	Chuck Horn	Republican	1984
7	Richard Finan	Republican	1978 (Appt.)
8	Lou Blessing	Republican	1996
9	Janet C. Howard	Republican	1994
10	Merle G. Kearns	Republican	1991 (Appt.)
11	Linda J. Furney	Democratic	1986
12	Robert R. Cupp	Republican	1984
13	Alan Zaleski	Democrat	1982
14	Doug White	Republican	1996 (Appt.)
15	Ben Espy	Democratic	1992 (Appt.)
16	Eugene J. Watts	Republican	1984
17	Michael Shoemaker	Democratic	1997 (Appt.)
18	Robert A. Gardner	Republican	1996
19	Richard Schafrath	Republican	1986
20	James E. Carnes	Republican	1995 (Appt.)
21	Jeffrey Johnson	Democratic	1990 (Appt.)
22	Grace L. Drake	Republican	1984 (Appt.)
23	Patrick Sweeney	Democratic	1997 (Appt.)
24	Gary C. Suhadolnik	Republican	1980
25	Judy Sheerer	Democratic	1992 (Appt.)
26	Larry Mumper	Republican	1997 (Appt.)
27	Roy Ray	Republican	1986
28	Leigh Herington	Democratic	1995 (Appt.)
29	Scott Oelslager	Republican	1985 (Appt.)
30	Gregory L. DiDonato	Democratic	1996
31	Jay Hottinger	Republican	1998 (Appt.)
32	Anthony Latell Jr.	Democratic	1992
33	Bob Hagan	Democratic	1997 (Appt.)

== House of Representatives ==
=== Leadership ===
==== Majority leadership ====
- Speaker of the House: Jo Ann Davidson
- President pro tempore of the House: William G. Batchelder
- Floor Leader: Randy Gardner
- Assistant Majority Floor Leader: Pat Tiberi
- Majority Whip: Jim Buchy
- Assistant Majority Whip: Bill Harris

==== Minority leadership ====
- Leader: Ross Boggs
- Assistant Leader: Johnnie Maier
- Whip: Charleta Taveres
- Assistant Whip: Tom Roberts

=== Members of the 122nd Ohio House of Representatives ===
District	Representative	Party	First elected
1	John R. Willamowski	Republican	1997 (Appt.)
2	George E. Terwilleger	Republican	1992
3	Sean D. Logan	Democratic	1990 (Appt.)
4	Randy Gardner	Republican	1985 (Appt.)
5	Ross Boggs	Democratic	1982
6	Jon D. Myers	Republican	1990
7	Ron Amstutz	Republican	1980
8	C.J. Prentiss	Democratic	1990
9	Barbara Boyd	Democratic	1992
10	Troy Lee James	Democratic	1967
11	Peter Lawson Jones	Democratic	1996
12	Vermel Whalen	Democratic	1986 (Appt.)
13	Barbara C. Pringle	Democratic	1982 (Appt.)
14	Ed Jerse	Democratic	1995 (Appt.)
15	Mike Wise	Republican	1992
16	Ed Kasputis	Republican	1990
17	Dan Brady	Democratic	1996
18	Erin Sullivan	Democratic	1998 (Appt.)
19	Dale Miller	Democratic	1996
20	Ron Mottl	Democratic	1997 (Appt.)
21	Otto Beatty Jr.	Democratic	1980 (Appt.)
22	Charleta Tavares	Democratic	1993 (Appt.)
23	Amy Salerno	Republican	1994
24	Jo Ann Davidson	Republican	1980
25	David Goodman	Republican	1998 (Appt.)
26	Patrick Tiberi	Republican	
27	E. J. Thomas	Republican	
28	Priscilla D. Mead	Republican	1992
29	Bill Schuck	Republican	
30	Samuel T. Britton	Democratic	1994
31	Mark Mallory	Democratic	1994
32	Dale N. Van Vyven	Republican	
33	Jerome F. Luebbers	Democratic	1978
34	Cheryl Winkler	Republican	1990 (Appt.)
35	Patricia Clancy	Republican	1996
36	Bob Schuler	Republican	1992
37	Jacquelyn K. O'Brien	Republican	1986
38	Dixie Allen	Democratic	1998 (Appt.)
39	Tom Roberts	Democratic	1986 (Appt.)
40	Jeff Jacobson	Republican	
41	Don Mottley	Republican	1992
42	Bob Corbin	Republican	1976
43	Bob Netzley	Republican	1967
44	Vernon Sykes	Democratic	1983 (Appt.)
45	Bryan C. Williams	Republican	1996
46	Kevin Coughlin	Republican	1996
47	Betty Sutton	Democratic	1992
48	Twyla Roman	Republican	1994
49	Jack Ford	Democratic	1994
50	John Garcia	Republican	1994
51	Lynn Olman	Republican	1995 (Appt.)
52	Sally Perz	Republican	1992
53	Darrell Opfer	Democratic	1992
54	William J. Healy	Democratic	1974
55	Kirk Schuring	Republican	1994
56	Johnnie Maier Jr.	Democratic	1990
57	Ron Hood	Republican	1994
58	Gary Cates	Republican	1995 (Appt.)
59	Greg Jolivette	Republican	1997 (Appt.)
60	Gene Krebs	Republican	
61	Dan Metelsky	Democratic	1996 (Appt.)
62	John Bender	Democratic	1992
63	Bill Taylor	Republican	1994
64	Sylvester Patton	Democratic	1997 (Appt.)
65	Ron Gerberry	Democratic	1974
66	Chris Verich	Democratic	1998
67	June Lucas	Democratic	1986
68	Diane Grendell	Republican	1992
69	Ron Young	Republican	
70	Jamie Callender	Republican	1996
71	Sam Bateman	Republican	
72	Rose Vesper	Republican	
73	David Hartley	Democratic	
74	Joe Haines	Republican	1980
75	Ann H. Womer Benjamin	Republican	1994
76	Marilyn Reid	Republican	1992
77	Jay Hottinger	Republican	
78	Larry Householder	Republican	1996
79	William J. Hartnett	Democratic	1998 (Appt.)
87	Joan Lawrence	Republican	1982
81	William G. Batchelder	Republican	1968
82	Richard Hodges	Republican	1992
83	Lynn Wachtmann	Republican	1984
84	Jim Buchy	Republican	
85	Jim Jordan	Republican	1994
86	Chuck Brading	Republican	
87	Ed Core	Republican	
88	Dennis Stapleton	Republican	1996 (Appt.)
89	Rex Damschroder	Republican	1994
90	Randy Weston	Democratic	1990
91	Joseph P. Sulzer	Democratic	1997 (Appt.)
92	William L. Ogg	Democratic	1994
93	Bill Harris	Republican	1994
94	John Carey	Republican	1994
95	Joy Padgett	Republican	1992
96	Tom Johnson	Republican	1976
97	Kerry R. Metzger	Republican	1994
98	Jerry W. Krupinski	Democratic	1986
99	Charlie Wilson	Democratic	1996

Appt.- Member was appointed to current House Seat

== See also ==
- Ohio House of Representatives membership, 126th General Assembly
- Ohio House of Representatives membership, 125th General Assembly
