= Ohio's 14th House of Representatives district =

American legislative district

Ohio's 14th State House of Representatives district
Representative
Sean Brennan; D–Parma
- Population (2020): 125,123

Ohio's 14th House of Representatives district is currently represented by Democrat Sean Brennan. It is located entirely within Cuyahoga County and includes the cities of Parma, Parma Heights and part of Cleveland.

== List of members representing the district ==
Member	Party	Years	General Assembly	Electoral history
District established January 2, 1967.
Ethel Swanbeck (Huron)	Republican	January 2, 1967 – December 31, 1972	107th 108th 109th	Elected in 1966. Re-elected in 1968. Re-elected in 1970. Redistricted to the 72nd district.
John Sweeney (Cleveland)	Democratic	January 1, 1973 – December 31, 1974	110th	Redistricted from the 54th district and re-elected in 1972. Retired.
Arthur Brooks (Cleveland Heights)	Democratic	January 6, 1975 – December 31, 1978	111th 112th	Elected in 1974. Re-elected in 1976. Retired.
Mary O. Boyle (Cleveland Heights)	Democratic	January 1, 1979 – December 31, 1982	113th 114th	Elected in 1978. Re-elected in 1980. Redistricted to the 15th district.
Ike Thompson (Cleveland)	Democratic	January 3, 1983 – December 31, 1990	115th 116th 117th 118th	Redistricted from the 13th district and re-elected in 1982. Re-elected in 1984. Re-elected in 1986. Re-elected in 1988. Retired.
C. J. Prentiss (Cleveland)	Democratic	January 7, 1991 – December 31, 1992	119th	Elected in 1990. Redistricted to the 8th district.
Ron Suster (Euclid)	Democratic	January 4, 1993 – October 5, 1995	120th 121st	Redistricted from the 19th district and re-elected in 1992. Re-elected in 1994. Resigned to become Cuyahoga County Court of Common Pleas judge.
Ed Jerse (Euclid)	Democratic	October 5, 1995 – December 31, 2002	121st 122nd 123rd 124th	Appointed to finish Suster's term. Re-elected in 1996. Re-elected in 1998. Re-elected in 2000. Redistricted to the 7th district.
Dale Miller (Cleveland)	Democratic	January 6, 2003 – March 1, 2006	125th 126th	Redistricted from the 19th district and re-elected in 2002. Re-elected in 2004. Resigned to become state senator.
Vacant		March 1, 2006 – May 25, 2006	126th	
Michael Foley (Cleveland)	Democratic	May 25, 2006 – December 31, 2014	126th 127th 128th 129th 130th	Appointed to finish Miller's term. Elected in 2006. Re-elected in 2008. Re-elected in 2010. Re-elected in 2012. Term-limited.
Martin J. Sweeney (Cleveland)	Democratic	January 5, 2015 – October 1, 2018	131st 132nd	Elected in 2014. Re-elected in 2016. Resigned.
Vacant		October 1, 2018 – November 14, 2018	132nd	
Bride Rose Sweeney (Cleveland)	Democratic	November 14, 2018 – December 31, 2022	132nd 133rd 134th	Elected in 2018. Appointed to finish Sweeney's term. Re-elected in 2020. Redistricted to the 16th district.
Sean Brennan (Parma)	Democratic	January 2, 2023 – present	135th	Elected in 2022.
