= Ohio's 4th House of Representatives district =

American legislative district

Ohio's 4th State House of Representatives district
Representative
Beryl Piccolantonio; D–Gahanna
- Population (2020): 113,292

Ohio's 4th House of Representatives district is currently represented by Democrat Beryl Piccolantonio. It is located entirely within Franklin County and includes the cities of Gahanna, New Albany, Westerville, and part of Columbus, as well as Blendon, Jefferson, Plain, and Sharon townships.

== List of members representing the district ==
Member	Party	Years	General Assembly	Electoral history
District established January 2, 1967.
Charles Kurfess (Perrysburg)	Republican	January 2, 1967 – December 31, 1972	107th 108th 109th	Elected in 1966. Re-elected in 1968. Re-elected in 1970. Redistricted to the 83rd district.
James Celebrezze (Cleveland)	Democratic	January 1, 1973 – December 31, 1974	110th	Redistricted from the 50th district and re-elected in 1972. Retired to run for Cuyahoga County Court of Common Pleas judge.
Rocco Colonna (Brook Park)	Democratic	January 6, 1975 – December 31, 1982	111th 112th 113th 114th	Elected in 1974. Re-elected in 1976. Re-elected in 1978. Re-elected in 1980. Redistricted to the 7th district.
William G. Batchelder (Medina)	Republican	January 3, 1983 – December 31, 1992	115th 116th 117th 118th 119th	Redistricted from the 93rd district and re-elected in 1982. Re-elected in 1984. Re-elected in 1986. Re-elected in 1988. Re-elected in 1990. Redistricted to the 81st district.
Randy Gardner (Bowling Green)	Republican	January 4, 1993 – December 31, 2000	120th 121st 122nd 123rd	Redistricted from the 5th district and re-elected in 1992. Re-elected in 1994. Re-elected in 1996. Re-elected in 1998. Term-limited.
Bob Latta (Bowling Green)	Republican	January 1, 2001 – December 31, 2002	124th	Elected in 2000. Redistricted to the 6th district.
John R. Willamowski (Lima)	Republican	January 2, 2003 – December 31, 2006	125th 126th	Redistricted from the 1st district and re-elected in 2002. Re-elected in 2004. Term-limited.
Matt Huffman (Lima)	Republican	January 1, 2007 – December 31, 2014	127th 128th 129th 130th	Elected in 2006. Re-elected in 2008. Re-elected in 2010. Re-elected in 2012. Term-limited.
Robert R. Cupp (Shawnee)	Republican	January 5, 2015 – December 31, 2022	131st 132nd 133rd 134th	Elected in 2014. Re-elected in 2016. Re-elected in 2018. Re-elected in 2020. Term-limited.
Mary Lightbody (Westerville)	Democratic	January 2, 2023 – January 9, 2024	135th	Redistricted from the 19th district and re-elected in 2022. Retired.
Beryl Piccolantonio (Gahanna)	Democratic	January 10, 2024 – present	135th	Appointed to finish Lightbody's term.
