= 2016 Ohio Senate election =

- November 8, 2016

16 out of 33 seats in the Ohio Senate 17 seats needed for a majority
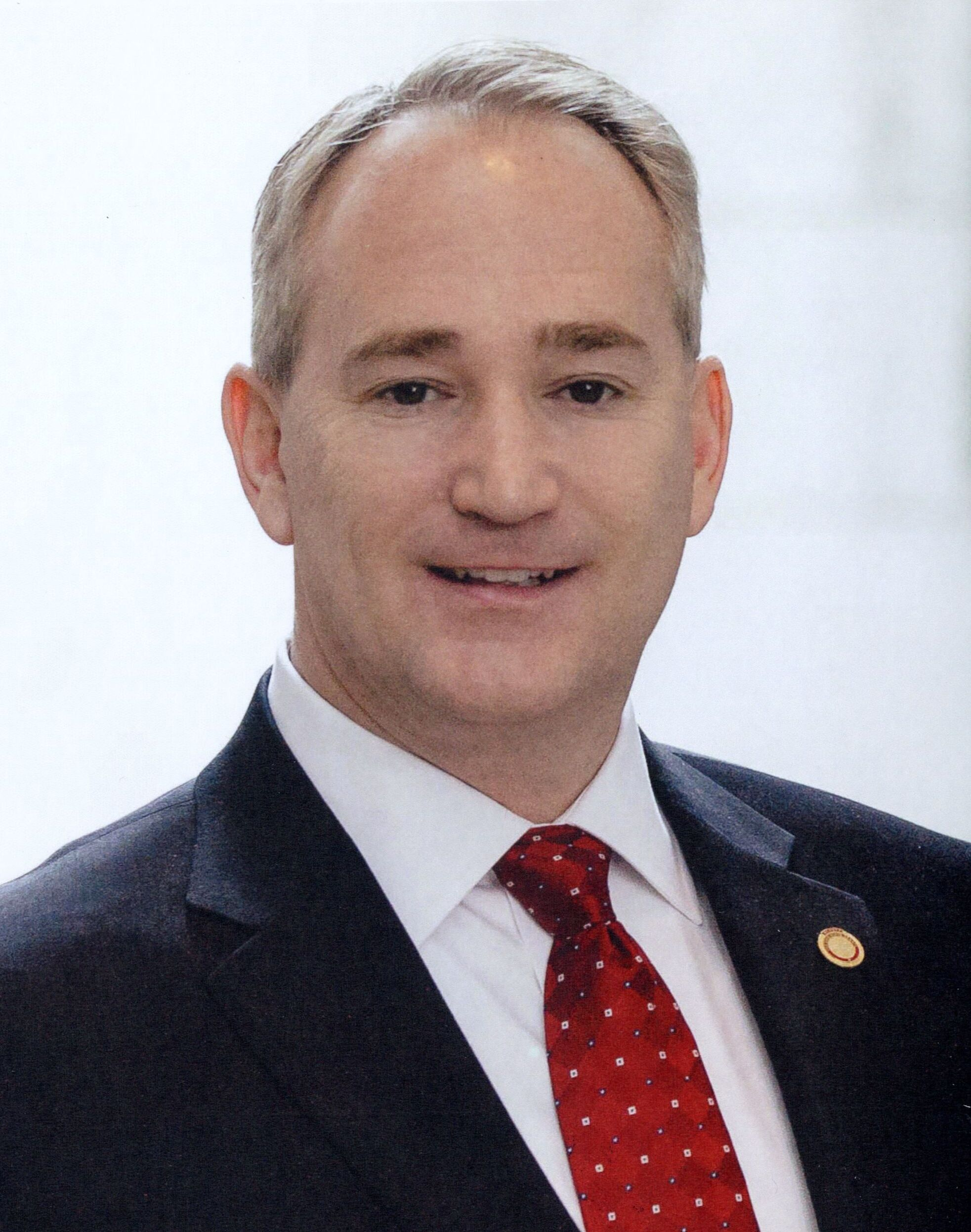

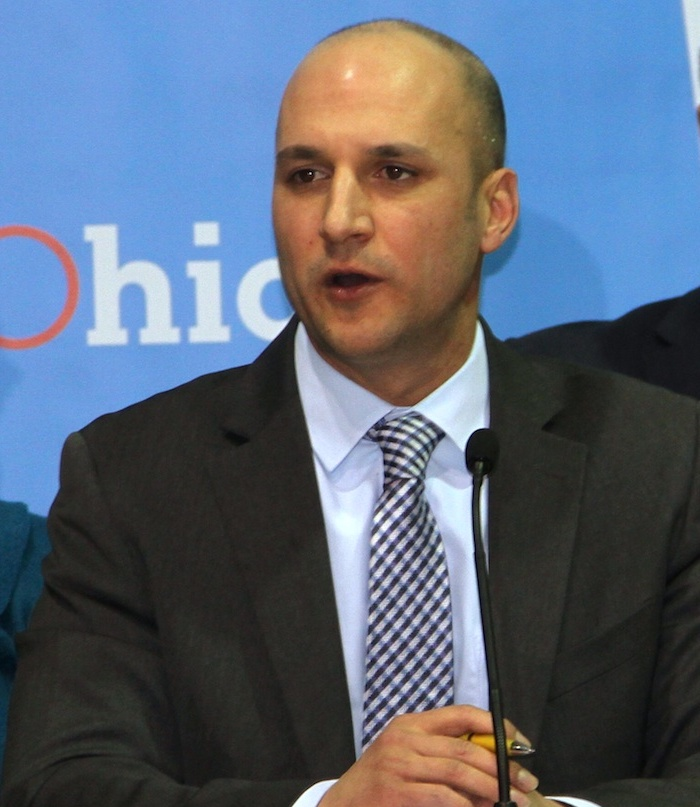
	Majority party	Minority party
Leader	Keith Faber (term-limited)	Joe Schiavoni
Party	Republican	Democratic
Leader since	January 7, 2013	January 14, 2014
Leader's seat	District 12	District 33
Last election	23	10
Seats after	24	9
Seat change	▲1	▼1
Popular vote	1,633,059	821,822
Percentage	66.52%	33.48%
President of the Senate before election
Keith Faber
Republican
Elected President of the Senate
Larry Obhof
Republican

The 2016 Ohio Senate election was held on November 8, 2016, to determine which party would control the Ohio Senate for the following two years in the 132nd Ohio General Assembly. The 16 even numbered seats out of the 33 seats in the Ohio Senate were up for election and the primary was held on March 15, 2016. Prior to the election, 23 seats were held by Republicans and 10 seats were held by Democrats. The general election saw Republicans expanding their majority in the State Senate by a single seat.

== Predictions ==
Source	Ranking	As of
Governing	Likely R	October 12, 2016

== Retirements ==
=== Democrats ===
1. District 28: Thomas Sawyer was term-limited.
2. District 32: Capri Cafaro was term-limited.

=== Republicans ===
1. District 8: Bill Seitz was term-limited.
2. District 12: Keith Faber was term-limited.
3. District 16: Jim Hughes was term-limited.
4. District 24: Tom Patton was term-limited.

== Closest races ==
Seats where the margin of victory was under 10%:

1. District 30, 5.80% (gain)

== Results ==
=== District 2 ===
District 2 election, 2016
Party	Candidate	Votes	%
Republican	Randy Gardner (incumbent)	118,232	66.38%
Democratic	Kirk Halliday	59,882	33.62%
Total votes		178,114	100.0%
Republican hold			

=== District 4 ===
District 4 election, 2016
Party	Candidate	Votes	%
Republican	Bill Coley (incumbent)	105,810	67.66%
Democratic	John Kinne	50,580	32.34%
Total votes		156,390	100.0%
Republican hold			

=== District 6 ===
District 6 election, 2016
Party	Candidate	Votes	%
Republican	Peggy Lehner (incumbent)	114,168	68.06%
Democratic	Albert Griggs	53,584	31.94%
Total votes		167,752	100.0%
Republican hold			

=== District 8 ===
District 8 election, 2016
Party	Candidate	Votes	%
Republican	Louis Terhar	106,215	62.88%
Democratic	Mary Rose Lierman	62,693	37.12%
Total votes		168,908	100.0%
Republican hold			

=== District 10 ===
District 10 election, 2016
Party	Candidate	Votes	%
Republican	Bob Hackett (incumbent)	99,477	65.14%
Democratic	Matthew Kirk	53,239	34.86%
Total votes		152,716	100.0%
Republican hold			

=== District 12 ===
District 12 election, 2016
Party	Candidate	Votes	%
Republican	Matt Huffman	120,090	100.0%
Total votes		120,090	100.0%
Republican hold			

=== District 14 ===
District 14 election, 2016
Party	Candidate	Votes	%
Republican	Joe Uecker (incumbent)	112,706	71.91%
Democratic	Charlie Carlier	44,014	28.09%
Total votes		156,720	100.0%
Republican hold			

=== District 16 ===
District 16 election, 2016
Party	Candidate	Votes	%
Republican	Stephanie Kunze	109,454	58.99%
Democratic	Cathy Johnson	76,077	41.01%
Total votes		185,531	100.0%
Republican hold			

=== District 18 ===
District 18 election, 2016
Party	Candidate	Votes	%
Republican	John Eklund (incumbent)	107,972	65.27%
Democratic	Wiley Runnestrand	57,446	34.73%
Total votes		165,418	100.0%
Republican hold			

=== District 20 ===
District 20 election, 2016
Party	Candidate	Votes	%
Republican	Troy Balderson (incumbent)	111,883	100.0%
Total votes		111,883	100.0%
Republican hold			

=== District 22 ===
District 22 election, 2016
Party	Candidate	Votes	%
Republican	Larry Obhof (incumbent)	113,666	69.78%
Democratic	Christopher King	49,218	30.22%
Total votes		162,884	100.0%
Republican hold			

=== District 24 ===
District 24 election, 2016
Party	Candidate	Votes	%
Republican	Matt Dolan	107,500	58.14%
Democratic	Emily Hagan	77,383	41.86%
Total votes		184,883	100.0%
Republican hold			

=== District 26 ===
District 26 election, 2016
Party	Candidate	Votes	%
Republican	David Burke (incumbent)	107,351	100.0%
Total votes		107,351	100.0%
Republican hold			

=== District 28 ===
District 28 election, 2016
Party	Candidate	Votes	%
Democratic	Vernon Sykes	83,805	61.21%
Republican	Jonathan Schulz	53,117	38.79%
Total votes		136,922	100.0%
Democratic hold			

=== District 30 ===
District 30 election, 2016
Party	Candidate	Votes	%
Republican	Frank Hoagland	84,747	52.90%
Democratic	Lou Gentile (incumbent)	75,450	47.10%
Total votes		160,197	100.0%
Republican gain from Democratic			

=== District 32 ===
District 32 election, 2016
Party	Candidate	Votes	%
Democratic	Sean O'Brien	78,451	56.39%
Republican	Robert Allen	60,671	43.61%
Total votes		139,122	100.0%
Democratic hold			
