= 124th Ohio General Assembly =

The One Hundred Twenty-fourth Ohio General Assembly was the legislative body of the state of Ohio in 2001 and 2002. In this General Assembly, both the Ohio Senate and the Ohio House of Representatives were controlled by the Republican Party. In the Senate, there were 21 Republicans and 12 Democrats. In the House, there were 60 Republicans and 39 Democrats. It was also the last General Assembly to use redistricted legislative districts after the 1990 United States census.

== Major events ==
=== Vacancies ===
- January 16, 2001: Senator Roy Ray (R-27th) resigns.
- February 5, 2001: Representative Kevin Coughlin (R-46th) resigns to take a seat in the Ohio Senate.
- September 18, 2001: Senator Bruce Johnson (R-3rd) resigns to become Director of Development in the cabinet of Governor Bob Taft.
- October 2, 2001: Representative David Goodman (R-25th) resigns to become a member of the Ohio Senate.
- October 17, 2001: Representative Dan Metelsky (D-61) resigns to become deputy director of the Ohio Lottery.
- December 5, 2001: Senator Rhine McLin (D-5th) resigns to become Mayor of Dayton, Ohio.
- December 31, 2001: Representative Jack Ford (D-49th) resigns to become Mayor of Toledo, Ohio.
- February 9, 2002: Representative Peter Lawson Jones (D-11th) resigns to become a Cuyahoga County, Ohio Commissioner
- February 13, 2002: Representative John E. Barnes Jr. (D-12th) resigns to become Director of Community Relations for Cleveland, Ohio.
- December 19, 2002: Senator Tim Ryan (D-32nd) resigns due to his election to the United States House of Representatives.
- December 31, 2002: Senator Priscilla D. Mead (R-16th) resigns.

=== Appointments ===
- February 6, 2001: Kevin Coughlin appointed to the 27th Senatorial District due to the resignation of Roy Ray.
- February 12, 2001: John Widowfield appointed to the 46th House District due to the resignation of Kevin Coughlin.
- October 2, 2001: David Goodman appointed to the 3rd Senatorial District due to the resignation of Bruce Johnson.
- October 10, 2001: Jim McGregor appointed to the 25th House District due to the resignation of David Goodman.
- October 30, 2001: Joseph Koziura appointed to the 61st House District due to the resignation of Dan Metelsky.
- January 8, 2002: Edna Brown appointed to the 49th House District due to the resignation of Jack Ford.
- January 9, 2002: Tom Roberts appointed to the 5th Senatorial District due to the resignation of Rhine McLin.
- February 13, 2002: Michael DeBose appointed to the 12th House District due to the resignation of John E. Barnes Jr.
- February 20, 2002: Lance Mason appointed to the 11th House District due to the resignation of Peter Lawson Jones.

== Senate ==
=== Leadership ===
==== Majority leadership ====
- President of the Senate: Richard Finan
- President pro tempore of the Senate: Bruce Johnson
- Assistant pro tempore: Jay Hottinger
- Whip: Randy Gardner

==== Minority leadership ====
- Leader: Leigh Herington
- Assistant Leader: Greg DiDonato
- Whip: Dan Brady
- Assistant Whip: Mark Mallory

=== Members of the 124th Ohio Senate ===
District	Senator	Party	First elected
1	Lynn Wachtmann	Republican	1998
2	Randy Gardner	Republican	2000
3	David Goodman	Republican	2001 (Appt.)
4	Scott Nein	Republican	1995 (Appt.)
5	Tom Roberts	Democratic	2002 (Appt.)
6	Jeff Jacobson	Republican	2000
7	Richard Finan	Republican	1978 (Appt.)
8	Lou Blessing	Republican	1996
9	Mark Mallory	Democratic	1998
10	Steve Austria	Republican	2000
11	Linda J. Furney	Democratic	1986
12	Jim Jordan	Republican	2000
13	Jeff Armbruster	Republican	1998
14	Doug White	Republican	1996 (Appt.)
15	Ben Espy	Democratic	1992 (Appt.)
16	Priscilla D. Mead	Republican	2000
17	Michael Shoemaker	Democratic	1997 (Appt.)
18	Robert A. Gardner	Republican	1996
19	Bill Harris	Republican	2000 (Appt.)
20	James E. Carnes	Republican	1995 (Appt.)
21	C.J. Prentiss	Democratic	1998
22	Ron Amstutz	Republican	2000
23	Dan Brady	Democratic	1998
24	Robert Spada	Republican	1999 (Appt.)
25	Eric Fingerhut	Democratic	1998
26	Larry Mumper	Republican	1997 (Appt.)
27	Kevin Coughlin	Republican	2001 (Appt.)
28	Leigh Herington	Democratic	1995 (Appt.)
29	Scott Oelslager	Republican	1985 (Appt.)
30	Gregory L. DiDonato	Democratic	1996
31	Jay Hottinger	Republican	1998 (Appt.)
32	Tim Ryan	Democratic	2000
33	Bob Hagan	Democratic	1997 (Appt.)

== House of Representatives ==
=== Leadership ===
==== Majority leadership ====
- Speaker of the House: Larry Householder
- President pro tempore of the Senate: Gary Cates
- Floor Leader: Patricia Clancy
- Assistant Majority Floor Leader: Steve Buehrer
- Majority Whip: Jim Trakas
- Assistant Majority Whip: Jon Peterson

==== Minority leadership ====
- Leader: Jack Ford
- Assistant Leader: Charlie Wilson
- Whip: Erin Sullivan
- Assistant Whip: Dale Miller

=== Members of the 124th Ohio House of Representatives ===
District	Representative	Party	First elected
1	John R. Willamowski	Republican	1997 (Appt.)
2	Tom Raga	Republican	2000
3	Chuck Blasdel	Republican	2000
4	Bob Latta	Republican	2000
5	George Distel	Democratic	1999 (Appt.)
6	Tim Schaffer	Republican	2000
7	Jim Carmichael	Republican	2000
8	Shirley Smith	Democratic	1998
9	Claudette Woodard	Democratic	2000
10	Annie L. Key	Democratic	2000
11	Lance Mason	Democratic	2002 (Appt.)
12	Michael DeBose	Democratic	2002 (Appt.)
13	Mary Rose Oakar	Democratic	2000
14	Ed Jerse	Democratic	1995 (Appt.)
15	Jim Trakas	Republican	1998
16	Sally Conway Kilbane	Republican	1998
17	Bryan Flannery	Democratic	1998
18	Erin Sullivan	Democratic	1998 (Appt.)
19	Dale Miller	Democratic	1996
20	Dean DePiero	Democratic	1998
21	Joyce Beatty	Democratic	1999 (Appt.)
22	Ray Miller	Democratic	1998
23	Amy Salerno	Republican	1994
24	Larry L. Flowers	Republican	2000
25	Jim McGregor	Republican	2001 (Appt.)
26	Linda Reidelbach	Republican	2000
27	Jim Hughes	Republican	2000 (Appt.)
28	Geoffrey C. Smith	Republican	1998
29	Larry Wolpert	Republican	
30	Samuel T. Britton	Democratic	1994
31	Catherine L. Barrett	Democratic	1998
32	Wayne Coates	Democratic	2000
33	Steve Driehaus	Democratic	2000
34	Bill Seitz	Republican	2000
35	Patricia Clancy	Republican	1996
36	Michelle G. Schneider	Republican	2000
37	Tom Brinkman Jr.	Republican	2000
38	Dixie Allen	Democratic	1998 (Appt.)
39	Fred Strahorn	Democratic	2000
40	Arlene Setzer	Republican	2000
41	Jon Husted	Republican	2000
42	John White	Republican	2000
43	Diana Fessler	Republican	2000
44	Barbara Sykes	Democratic	2000
45	Bryan C. Williams	Republican	1996
46	John Widowfield	Republican	2001 (Appt.)
47	Robert J. Otterman	Democratic	2000
48	Twyla Roman	Republican	1994
49	Edna Brown	Democratic	2002 (Appt.)
50	Jeanine Perry	Democratic	1998
51	Lynn Olman	Republican	1995 (Appt.)
52	Teresa Fedor	Democratic	2000
53	Chris Redfern	Democratic	1999 (Appt.)
54	Mary Cirelli	Democratic	2000
55	Kirk Schuring	Republican	1994
56	John Hagan	Republican	2000
57	John Boccieri	Democratic	2000
58	Gary Cates	Republican	1995 (Appt.)
59	Greg Jolivette	Republican	1997 (Appt.)
60	Shawn Webster	Republican	2000
61	Joseph Koziura	Democratic	2001 (Appt.)
62	Jeffrey Manning	Republican	2000
63	J. Tom Lendrum	Republican	2000
64	Sylvester Patton	Democratic	1997 (Appt.)
65	Kenneth Carano	Democratic	2000
66	Daniel Sferra	Democratic	2000
67	Anthony Latell Jr.	Democratic	2000
68	Tim Grendell	Republican	2000
69	Ron Young	Republican	
70	Jamie Callender	Republican	1996
71	Jean Schmidt	Republican	2000
72	Tom Niehaus	Republican	2000
73	Ron Rhine	Democratic	
74	Merle G. Kearns	Republican	2000
75	Ann H. Womer Benjamin	Republican	1994
76	Kevin DeWine	Republican	2000
77	David R. Evans	Republican	1998 (Appt.)
78	Larry Householder	Republican	1996
79	William J. Hartnett	Democratic	1998 (Appt.)
80	Jon Peterson	Republican	2000
81	Chuck Calvert	Republican	
82	Steve Buehrer	Republican	1998
83	Jim Hoops	Republican	1998
84	Keith Faber	Republican	2000
85	Derrick Seaver	Republican	2000
86	Mike Gilb	Republican	2000
87	Tony Core	Republican	1999 (Appt.)
88	Dennis Stapleton	Republican	1996 (Appt.)
89	Rex Damschroder	Republican	1994
90	Steve Reinhard	Republican	2000
91	Joseph P. Sulzer	Democratic	1997 (Appt.)
92	William L. Ogg	Democratic	1994
93	Thom Collier	Republican	2000 (Appt.)
94	John Carey	Republican	1994
95	Jim Aslanides	Republican	1999 (Appt.)
96	Nancy P. Hollister	Republican	1999 (Appt.)
97	Kerry R. Metzger	Republican	1994
98	Eileen Krupinski	Democratic	2000
99	Charlie Wilson	Democratic	1996

Appt.- Member was appointed to current House Seat

== See also ==
- Ohio House of Representatives membership, 126th General Assembly
- Ohio House of Representatives membership, 125th General Assembly
