= Ohio's 26th senatorial district =

American legislative district

Ohio's 26th State Senate district
Senator
Bill Reineke; R–Tiffin
- Demographics: 87.5% White; 4.1% Black; 4.2% Hispanic; 2% Asian; 1.9% Native American; 0.1% Hawaiian/Pacific Islander
- Population (2020) • Voting age • Citizens of voting age: 340,983; 264,218; 257,555

Even after the 2023 redistricting, Ohio's 26th senatorial district is still based in northern central Ohio, and currently comprises the counties of Sandusky, Seneca, Wyandot, Crawford, Morrow, Marion and Union. It encompasses Ohio House districts 86, 87 and 88. It has a Cook PVI of R+21.

The current Ohio Senator is Republican Bill Reineke.

== List of senators ==
Senator	Party	Term	Notes
Robin Turner	Republican	January 3, 1963 – December 31, 1972	Turner lost re-election in 1972 to Gene Slagle.
Gene Slagle	Democrat	January 3, 1973 – December 31, 1976	Slagle lost re-election in 1976 to Paul Pfeifer.
Paul Pfeifer	Republican	January 3, 1977 – December 31, 1992	Pfeifer did not seek re-election in 1992 and instead ran for the Ohio Supreme Court.
Karen Gillmor	Republican	January 3, 1993 – December 5, 1997	Gillmor resigned in 1997 to become a member of the State Employment Relations Board.
Larry Mumper	Republican	December 5, 1997 – December 31, 2008	Mumper was term-limited in 2008.
Karen Gillmor	Republican	January 5, 2009 – July 15, 2011	Gillmor resigned in 2011 to become a member of the Ohio Industrial Commission.
David Burke	Republican	July 15, 2011 – December 31, 2020	Burke was term-limited in 2020.
Bill Reineke	Republican	January 4, 2021 – present	Incumbent
