= Ohio's 16th House of Representatives district =

American legislative district

Ohio's 16th State House of Representatives district
Representative
Bride Rose Sweeney; D–Westlake
- Population (2020): 124,466

Ohio's 16th House of Representatives district is currently represented by Democrat Bride Rose Sweeney. It is located entirely within Cuyahoga County and includes the cities of Bay Village, Berea, North Olmsted, Olmsted Falls, and Westlake, and Olmsted Township.

== List of members representing the district ==
Member	Party	Years	General Assembly	Electoral history
District established January 2, 1967.
Lloyd Kerns (Raymond)	Republican	January 2, 1967 – December 31, 1972	107th 108th 109th	Elected in 1966. Re-elected in 1968. Re-elected in 1970. Retired.
Harry Lehman (Shaker Heights)	Democratic	January 1, 1973 – December 31, 1982	110th 111th 112th 113th	Redistricted from the 56th district and re-elected in 1972. Re-elected in 1974. Re-elected in 1976. Re-elected in 1978. Retired.
Lee Fisher (Shaker Heights)	Democratic	January 5, 1981 – December 31, 1982	114th	Elected in 1980. Retired to run for state senator.
John D. Thompson Jr. (Cleveland)	Democratic	January 3, 1983 – October 15, 1986	115th 116th	Redistricted from the 15th district and re-elected in 1982. Re-elected in 1984. Died.
Vacant		October 15, 1986 – November 16, 1986	116th	
Vermel Whalen (Cleveland)	Democratic	November 16, 1986 – December 31, 1992	116th 117th 118th 119th	Elected in 1986. Appointed to finish Thompson's term. Re-elected in 1988. Re-elected in 1990. Redistricted to the 12th district.
Ed Kasputis (Olmsted Township)	Republican	January 4, 1993 – December 31, 1998	120th 121st 122nd	Redistricted from the 6th district and re-elected in 1992. Re-elected in 1994. Re-elected in 1996. Retired to run for Ohio State Treasurer.
Sally Conway Kilbane (Rocky River)	Republican	January 4, 1999 – December 31, 2006	123rd 124th 125th 126th	Elected in 1998. Re-elected in 2000. Re-elected in 2002. Re-elected in 2004. Term-limited.
Jennifer Brady (Westlake)	Democratic	January 1, 2007 – December 31, 2008	127th	Elected in 2006. Lost re-election.
Nan Baker (Westlake)	Republican	January 5, 2009 – December 31, 2016	128th 129th 130th 131st	Elected in 2008. Re-elected in 2010. Re-elected in 2012. Re-elected in 2014. Term-limited.
Dave Greenspan (Westlake)	Republican	January 2, 2017 – December 31, 2020	132nd 133rd	Elected in 2016. Re-elected in 2018. Lost re-election.
Monique Smith (Fairview Park)	Democratic	January 4, 2021 – December 31, 2022	134th	Elected in 2020. Lost re-nomination.
Bride Rose Sweeney (Westlake)	Democratic	January 2, 2023 – present	135th	Redistricted from the 14th district and Re-elected in 2022.
