= Ohio's 1st House of Representatives district =

American legislative district

Ohio's 1st State House of Representatives district
Representative
Dontavius Jarrells; D–Columbus
- Population (2020): 118,269

Ohio's 1st House of Representatives district is currently represented by Democrat Dontavius Jarrells. It is located entirely within Franklin County and includes the city of Bexley and part of Columbus.

== List of members representing the district ==
Member	Party	Years	General Assembly	Electoral history
District established January 2, 1967.
Fred Hadley (Bryan)	Republican	January 2, 1967 – December 31, 1972	107th 108th 109th	Elected in 1966. Re-elected in 1968. Re-elected in 1970. Redistricted to the 79th district.
Raymond Luther (Newark)	Republican	January 1, 1973 – December 31, 1974	110th	Redistricted from the 19th district and re-elected in 1972. Lost re-election.
Eugene Branstool (Utica)	Democratic	January 6, 1975 – December 31, 1982	111th 112th 113th 114th	Elected in 1974. Re-elected in 1976. Re-elected in 1978. Re-elected in 1980. Retired to run for state senator.
Waldo Rose (Lima)	Republican	January 3, 1983 – December 31, 1986	115th 116th	Redistricted from the 64th district and re-elected in 1982. Re-elected in 1984. Retired to run for Ohio State Auditor.
Bill Thompson (Delphos)	Republican	January 5, 1987 – August 8, 1997	117th 118th 119th 120th 121st 122nd	Elected in 1986; Re-elected in 1988. Re-elected in 1990. Re-elected in 1992. Re-elected in 1994. Re-elected in 1996. Appointed to the Ohio Industrial Commission.
John R. Willamowski (Lima)	Republican	August 8, 1997 – December 31, 2002	122nd 123rd 124th	Appointed to finish Thompson's term. Re-elected in 1998. Re-elected in 2000. Redistricted to the 4th district.
Chuck Blasdel (East Liverpool)	Republican	January 6, 2003 – December 31, 2006	125th 126th	Redistricted from the 3rd district and re-elected in 2002. Re-elected in 2004. Retired to run for U.S. Representative.
Linda Bolon (East Palestine)	Democratic	January 1, 2007 – December 31, 2010	127th 128th	Elected in 2006. Re-elected in 2008. Lost re-election.
Craig Newbold (Columbiana)	Republican	January 3, 2011 – December 31, 2012	129th	Elected in 2010. Redistricted to the 5th district and lost re-election.
Ron Amstutz (Wooster)	Republican	January 7, 2013 – December 31, 2016	130th 131st	Redistricted from the 3rd district and re-elected in 2012. Re-elected in 2014. Term-limited.
Scott Wiggam (Wooster)	Republican	January 2, 2017 – December 31, 2022	132nd 133rd 134th	Elected in 2016. Re-elected in 2018. Re-elected in 2020. Redistricted to the 77th district.
Dontavius Jarrells (Columbus)	Democratic	January 2, 2023 – present	135th	Redistricted from the 25th district and re-elected in 2022.
