= Ohio's 24th senatorial district =

American legislative district

Ohio's 24th State Senate district
Senator
Tom Patton; R–Strongsville
- Demographics: 78.4% White; 7.4% Black; 8.4% Hispanic; 4.4% Asian; 1.7% Native American; 0.1% Hawaiian/Pacific Islander
- Population (2020) • Voting age • Citizens of voting age: 375,276; 302,712; 284,268

After the 2023 redistricting, Ohio's 24th senatorial district is the southern part of Cuyahoga County and is made up of Oho House districts 14, 15, and 17.

The current Ohio Senator is Republican Tom Patton.

== Historically ==
Before the 2023 redistricting, Ohio's 24th senate district has always been based in Cuyahoga County, but has encompassed different regions over the decades. It now consists of outer suburbs from the eastern to the western portions of the county. It encompasses Ohio House districts 6, 7 and 16. It has a Cook PVI of R+2.

== List of senators ==
Senator	Party	Term	Notes
Francis D. Sullivan	Democrat	January 1, 1963 – December 31, 1968	Sullivan lost the party nomination in 1968 to Ron Mottl.
Ron Mottl	Democrat	January 1, 1969 – December 31, 1974	Mottl resigned in 1974 after being elected to the United States Congress.
Jerome Stano	Democrat	January 1, 1975 – December 31, 1980	Stano lost re-election in 1980 to Gary C. Suhadolnik.
Gary C. Suhadolnik	Republican	January 1, 1981 – January 5, 1999	Suhadolnik resigned in 1999 to work under Ohio Governor Bob Taft.
Robert Spada	Republican	February 2, 1999 – November 2, 2008	Spada resigned in 2008 for a position on the State Employment Relations Board.
Tom Patton	Republican	November 18, 2008 – December 31, 2016	Patton was term-limited in the state Senate in 2016 and opted to return to the state House of Representatives.
Matt Dolan	Republican	January 1, 2017 – December 31, 2024	Term-limited; lost 2024 U.S. Senate Republican primary bid to Bernie Moreno
Tom Patton	Republican	January 1, 2025 – Present	Incumbent
