= Matt Patten =

American politician

Member of the Ohio House of Representatives from the 18th district
- In office January 5, 2009-December 31, 2010
- Preceded by: Tom Patton
- Succeeded by: Mike Dovilla

Personal details
- Born: June 16, 1977 (age 49) Cleveland, Ohio
- Party: Democratic
- Profession: Labor Management Coordinator

Matt Patten (born June 16, 1977) is a Democratic politician who served in the Ohio House of Representatives. A native of Cleveland, Ohio, Patten was a labor organizer before beginning a career in the political sector.

When Representative Tom Patton gave up another term in the House to run for the Ohio Senate, Patten ran for his seat. It was thought that Patten would run against term limited Senator Robert Spada, but an appointment given to Spada by Ohio Governor Ted Strickland changed the favorite of the race. With Spada out of the race, good last name recognition and a strong showing by Barack Obama within the district, Patten won the seat over Colleen Grady, who was a last minute entrant to the race.

Patten was sworn into his seat in the House on January 5, 2009, to a newly won Democratic majority. However, from the beginning of his term, Patten was a top target by Republicans. While Patten was a strong advocate for education and labor, as well as a supporter of health initiatives and gun rights, he was seen as potentially vulnerable by Democrats as well.

In his first reelection bid, Patten faced Mike Dovilla, a political consultant who was running for his first elected office. Over time, the race became one of the closest watched in the cycle, with Patten and Dovilla both neck and neck. Both the Democratic and Republican committees invested heavily in the campaign.

Patten was defeated by Dovilla, leaving him as a one-term Representative. Along with Patten's defeat, Republicans also took control of the majority in the Ohio House. After his term was completed, Patten returned to the Berea area.
