= Jim Buchy =

American politician

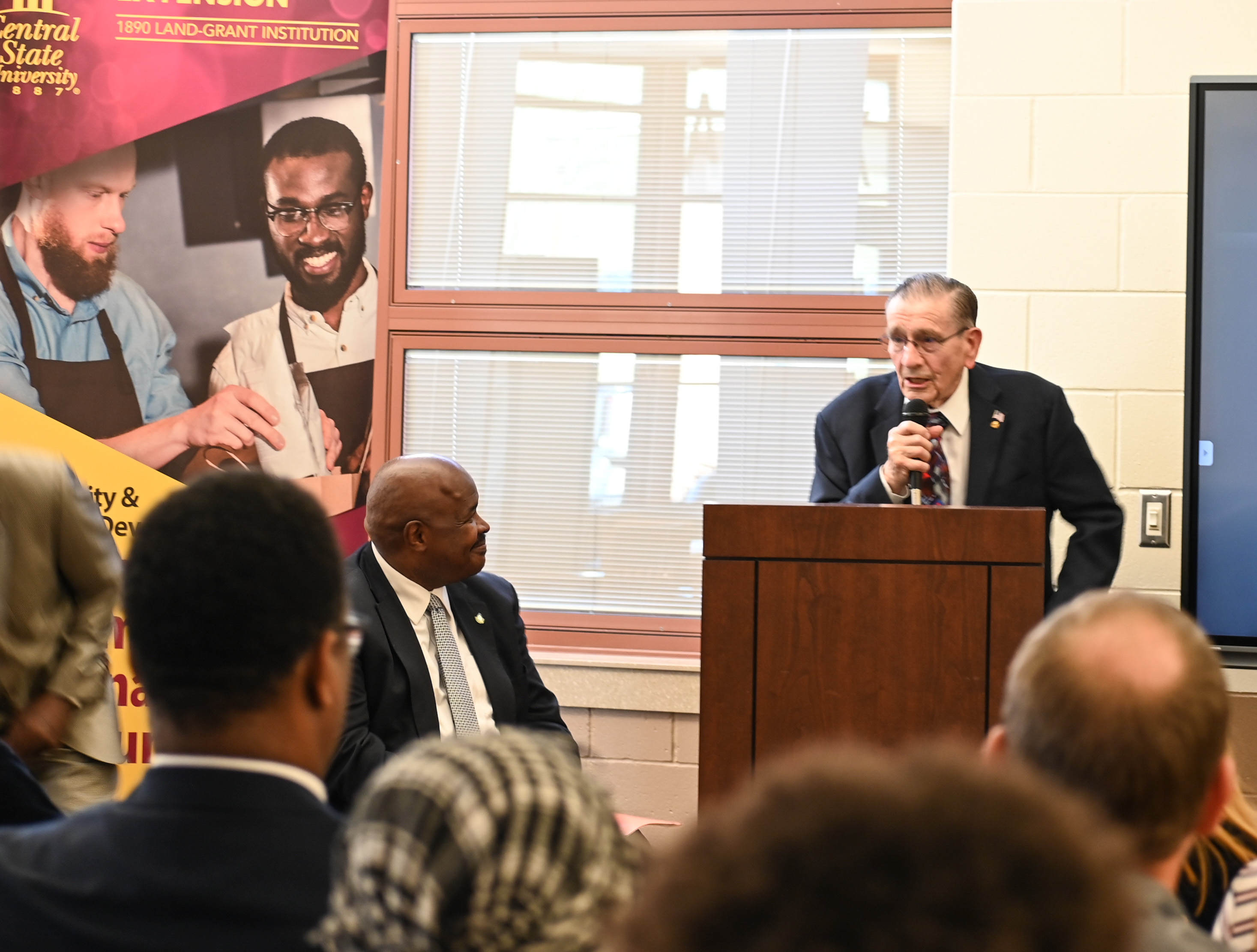

Member of the Ohio House of Representatives from the 84th district
- In office January 11, 2011-December 31, 2016
- Preceded by: Jim Zehringer
- Succeeded by: Keith Faber
- In office January 3, 1983-December 31, 2000
- Preceded by: Larry Balweg
- Succeeded by: Keith Faber

Personal details
- Born: September 24, 1940 (age 85) Greenville, Ohio, U.S.
- Party: Republican
- Education: Wittenberg University
- Profession: Small Business Owner

James J. Buchy (born September 24, 1940) is a former Republican member of the Ohio House of Representatives. He served two terms in the House, first from 1983 to 2000, and again from 2011 to 2016.

== Life and career ==
A graduate of Wittenberg University, Buchy is the former president and CEO of Buchy Food Service in Greenville. Buchy served as Assistant Director of the Ohio Department of Agriculture and with the National Federation of Independent Business.

Prior to his time in the Ohio House, Buchy served on the Greenville Board of Education.

== Ohio House of Representatives ==
Buchy first served in the Ohio House from 1983 to 2000, where he held positions as assistant majority floor leader, majority whip and assistant majority whip. In 2011, Representative Jim Zehringer was appointed by Ohio Governor John Kasich as the Director of Agriculture. As a result, Buchy was appointed as his successor in the Ohio House of Representatives. In the 129th General Assembly, he served on the committees of Agriculture and Natural Resources; Economic and Small Business Development; and State Government and Elections.

In 2012, Buchy won another term in the House, defeating Democrat Ronald Hammons with 81.01% of the vote.

Returning to the Ohio House of Representatives for another term, Buchy was elected back to leadership where he held the post, Assistant Majority Whip. He won a third term in 2014. In 2016, Buchy did not seek re-election as was succeeded again by Keith Faber.
