= Paul Pfeifer =

American jurist and politician

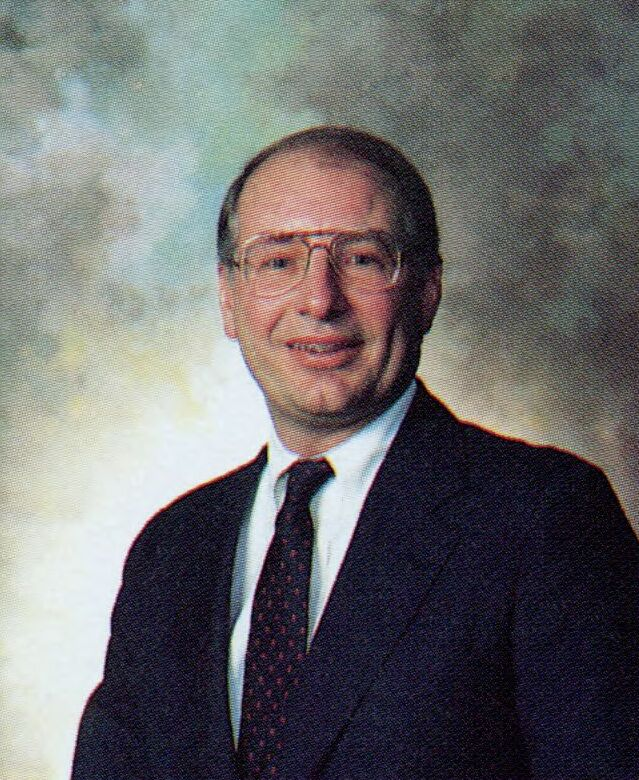

Associate Justice of the Supreme Court of Ohio
- In office January 2, 1993 – January 1, 2017
- Preceded by: Herbert R. Brown
- Succeeded by: Pat DeWine

Member of the Ohio Senate from the 26th district
- In office January 3, 1977 – December 31, 1992
- Preceded by: Gene Slagle
- Succeeded by: Karen Gillmor

Member of the Ohio House of Representatives from the 15th district
- In office January 3, 1971 – December 31, 1972
- Preceded by: Robert Carpenter
- Succeeded by: Gene Damschroder

Personal details
- Born: October 15, 1942 (age 83) Bucyrus, Ohio, U.S.
- Party: Republican

Paul E. Pfeifer (born October 15, 1942) is an American politician and jurist. He served in both houses of the Ohio General Assembly as a member of the Ohio Republican party and was most recently an associate justice of the Supreme Court of Ohio.

== Background ==
Pfeifer was born in Bucyrus in 1942. He grew up on his family's dairy farm near Bucyrus. As a teenager, he raised purebred Yorkshire hogs to finance his college education. He earned a bachelor of arts degree in economics, political science, and history in 1963 from Ohio State University. In 1966, he also earned a law degree from the College of Law.

Pfeifer owns a cattle farm in Crawford County, near his childhood home. Pfeifer and his wife Julia have three children and four grandchildren.

From 1967 to 1970, he worked as an assistant attorney general under Ohio Attorney General William B. Saxbe. Pfeifer practiced law – tax and trial law – as a partner with the firm Cory, Brown & Pfeifer from 1972 to 1992. From 1973 to 1976, he also served as an assistant to the Crawford County prosecutor.

== Political career ==
=== Ohio House of Representatives ===
In 1970, Pfeifer was elected to the Ohio House of Representatives. Pfeifer served as an Ohio state representative from 1971 to 1972. In 1976, he successfully ran for a seat in the Ohio Senate. Pfeifer was re-elected in 1980, 1984, and 1988. From 1983 to 1984, Pfeifer was minority floor leader and from 1985 to 1986, with a Republican majority in the Senate, Pfeifer became Assistant President Pro Tempore.

=== Election bids ===
In 1982, Pfeifer ran for the U.S. Senate, but was defeated by incumbent Democrat Howard Metzenbaum.

In 1990, Pfeifer ran for Ohio attorney general, losing to Democrat Lee Fisher by a narrow margin of just over 1,200 votes. Claiming that there were discrepancies between the total number of ballots cast and the number of signatures in the polling books, Pfeifer appealed to the Ohio Supreme Court to review the results, but the court refused.

=== Ohio Supreme Court justice ===
In 1992, Pfeifer was elected to the Ohio Supreme Court, defeating John T. Patton. In 1998, he was re-elected to the court, defeating Ronald Suster. Pfeifer was unopposed in his bid for re-election in 2004 and 2010. He retired January 1, 2017 when he was forced to leave the court after exceeding the age of 70, the mandatory retirement age for judges in Ohio. Pfeifer, as the longest serving associate Justice, became acting Chief Justice on April 2, 2010 upon the death of Chief Justice Thomas Moyer. Pfeifer remained in that capacity until May 3, 2010, when Franklin County Probate Court Judge Eric Brown, who was appointed Chief Justice by Governor Ted Strickland, took office.

Although nominally Republican, Pfeifer was often aligned with the Democratic minority on the Court.

Party political offices
Preceded by Robert Taft Jr.	Republican nominee for U.S. Senator from Ohio (Class 1); 1982	Succeeded by George Voinovich
Preceded by Barry Levey	Republican nominee for Attorney General of Ohio; 1990	Succeeded by Betty Montgomery
Legal offices
Preceded by Herbert R. Brown	Associate Justice of the Supreme Court of Ohio; 1993–2017	Succeeded by Pat DeWine
