= Tom Patton =

American politician (born 1953)

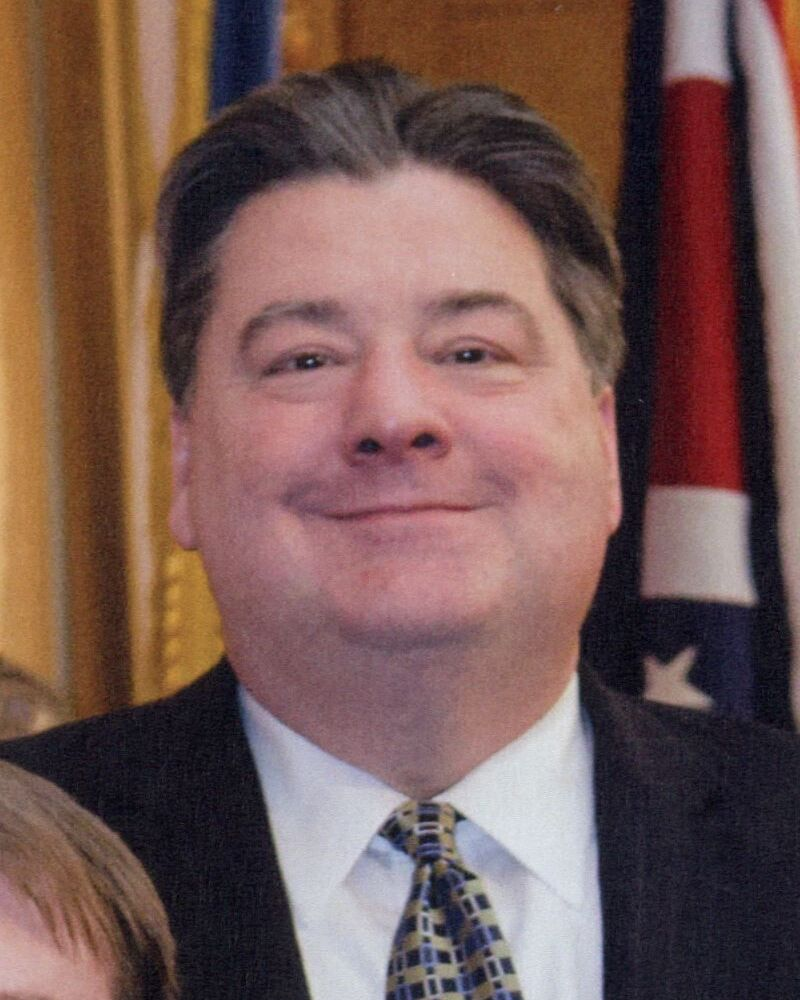

Member of the Ohio Senate from the 24th district
- Incumbent
- Assumed office January 1, 2025
- Preceded by: Matt Dolan
- In office November 18, 2008 – December 31, 2016
- Preceded by: Robert Spada
- Succeeded by: Matt Dolan

Member of the Ohio House of Representatives
- In office January 1, 2023 – December 31, 2024
- Preceded by: Adam Miller
- Succeeded by: Mike Dovilla
- Constituency: 17th district
- In office January 1, 2017 – December 31, 2022
- Preceded by: Mike Dovilla
- Succeeded by: Allison Russo
- Constituency: 7th district
- In office January 1, 2003 – November 18, 2008
- Preceded by: Erin Sullivan
- Succeeded by: Matt Patten
- Constituency: 18th district

Personal details
- Born: November 3, 1953 (age 73) Cleveland, Ohio, U.S.
- Party: Republican
- Education: Cleveland State University
- Profession: Legislator

Thomas F. Patton (born November 3, 1953) is a Republican member of the Ohio Senate, representing the 24th District since 2025.

Patton was elected to Ohio's 18th House of Representatives district from 2003 to 2008. He remained in the lower house throughout the 125th, 126th, and 127th Ohio General Assemblies. He was next elected to the Ohio State Senate, serving from 2008 to 2016. He assumed this position due to the resignation of Robert Spada shortly after the election. He represented Ohio's 24th Senatorial District for the 128th, 129th, 130th, and 131st Ohio General Assemblies. During the 130th and 131st Assemblies, Patton was Senate Majority Leader. Patton then returned to the Ohio House of Representatives, serving from 2017 onwards. He was elected to represent Ohio's 7th House District for the 132nd, 133rd, and 134th Ohio General Assemblies. During the 132nd Assembly he was the House Majority Whip.

== Ohio House of Representatives ==
With newly drawn district lines following redistricting in 2002, Patton was one of five Republicans who sought to succeed incumbent Erin Sullivan. To take the nomination, Patton received 42.33% of the vote. He went on to defeat Democrat Susan Adams in the general election with 52.4% of the vote. In his first reelection bid, Patton defeated Democrat Bobby Bland with 66.59% of the vote to take a second term. For his third term in House, Patton faced John Celebrezze in 2006 and won with 58.53% of the electorate.

Term-limited in the Senate in 2016, Patton succeeded in convincing Representative Mike Dovilla to run for his Senate seat, allowing for Patton to return to the House. Opposed in the Republican primary, Patton handily defeated Jennifer M. Herold, 79% to 21%. Dovilla lost the Republican primary for Patton's Senate seat to Matt Dolan. In a 2016 interview on America's Workforce Radio, Patton referred to his opponent, Jennifer Herold, as "gal" and "sweetie". In addition, he questioned her ability to serve because she is a mother of young children. The comments generated national coverage from outlets such as Cosmopolitan, Jezebel, and The Christian Science Monitor. Nate Beeler of The Columbus Dispatch also covered it, creating a cartoon regarding the comments.

Patton was unopposed in the general election, winning a seat that on paper is one of the most competitive in the state. He was sworn in for his fourth non-consecutive term in the House on January 3, 2017.

== Ohio Senate ==
When incumbent Bob Spada was unable to run for another term in the Ohio Senate in 2008, Patton decided to give up a fourth term in the House to run for the seat. Unopposed in the primary, Patton went on to defeat Democrat Gary Kucinich, brother of Dennis Kucinich, in the general election with 68.39% of the vote. Spada resigned his seat two months prior to the end of his term in order to take an appointment from Governor Ted Strickland. Subsequently, Senate Republicans decided to seat Patton early, in order for the Senate to have adequate representation throughout the important lame duck session. He was seated in the Senate on November 18, 2008. In 2012, Patton ran successfully for a second term, defeating Democrat Jennifer Brady with 59.16% of the vote.

Patton was elected to a new term representing the 24th district in 2024.

== Run for Congress ==
Patton announced his intention to seek the Republican nomination for Ohio's 16th Congressional District on July 31, 2017.

== Legal issues ==
During the trial of former Cuyahoga County Commissioner Jimmy Dimora, Patton was accused of bribing former Parma School Board member J. Kevin Kelley. Patton's third cousin, Kelley had already pleaded guilty to several counts of corruption related crimes when he testified under oath as to accepting the bribes from Patton. Patton denied the claim.
