= Mike Dovilla =

American politician (born 1975)

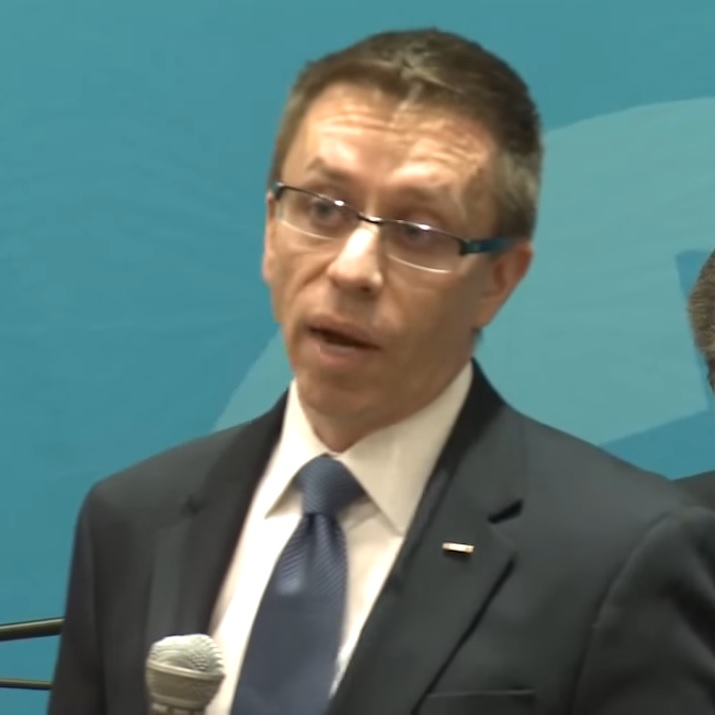
- Dovilla in 2016

Member of the Ohio House of Representatives
- Incumbent
- Assumed office January 1, 2025
- Preceded by: Tom Patton
- Constituency: 17th district
- In office January 3, 2011 – December 31, 2016
- Preceded by: Matt Patten
- Succeeded by: Tom Patton
- Constituency: 7th district

Personal details
- Born: March 13, 1975 (age 51) Cleveland, Ohio, U.S.
- Party: Republican
- Education: Baldwin-Wallace College
- Profession: Consultant

Michael D. Dovilla (born March 13, 1975) is a member of the Ohio House of Representatives who represents the Seventeenth District since 2025, having previously served from the 7th district from 2011 to 2016. He is a Republican.

== Career ==
Dovilla was raised in Berea, Ohio, and graduated from Baldwin-Wallace College and American University. A U.S. Navy veteran, he formerly worked as a Presidential appointee at the U.S. Office of Personnel Management, committee staffer for U.S. Senator George Voinovich and a Presidential Management Intern at the U.S. Department of State. He is a member of Phi Kappa Tau and began a two-year term as national president of the fraternity in July 2016. Dovilla is a lieutenant commander in the Reserve Component of the U.S. Navy, having earned his commission in 2002. In 2007–2008, he completed a 12-month deployment in Iraq. He also manages The Dovilla Group, a strategic consulting firm.

== Ohio House of Representatives ==
When incumbent Matt Patten won a district in 2008 by a slim margin, he quickly became a big target to Republicans in 2010, and Dovilla was fielded to try and knock him off. Quickly decided the favorite, Dovilla still faced strong opposition in a negative and costly campaign. In an overwhelmingly Republican year, Dovilla bested Patten by about 2000 votes.

He was sworn into his first term on January 3, 2011, and served as a member of the committees on Economic and Small Business Development; Education (vice-chairman, 2012); State Government and Elections and its Subcommittee on Redistricting; and Ways and Means (vice-chairman 2011–2012).

In 2012, Dovilla was redistricted into the 7th District, composed of the same communities as the former 18th District (Berea, North Royalton, Olmsted Falls, Olmsted Township, and Strongsville). He was reelected to the house with 50.11% of the vote over his predecessor Matt Patten, a margin of 122 votes.

He was sworn into his second term on January 7, 2013, and served as a member of the committees on Finance and Appropriations and its Subcommittee on Higher Education; Military and Veterans Affairs; and Policy and Legislative Oversight (chairman). Dovilla also served as the non-voting House member of the Ohio Turnpike and Infrastructure Commission from 2011 through 2016.

In 2014, Patten again challenged Dovilla for his seat but withdrew his candidacy in August, leaving Dovilla unopposed in the general election. Dovilla did not seek re-election in 2016 to run for the Ohio Senate, losing the Republican primary for the 24th District to Matt Dolan.
