= Jim Zehringer =

American politician

Member of the Ohio House of Representatives from the 77th district
- In office February 20, 2007-January 10, 2011
- Preceded by: Keith Faber
- Succeeded by: Jim Buchy

Personal details
- Born: October 16, 1952 (age 73)
- Party: Republican
- Profession: Politician/Farmer

Jim Zehringer (born October 16, 1952) is the former Director of the Ohio Department of Natural Resources and the Ohio Department of Agriculture, who served in the cabinet of Ohio Governor John Kasich from 2011 to 2019. He served in the Ohio House of Representatives from 2007 to 2011, and as a Mercer County Commissioner from 2002 to 2007. He is a retired politician and farmer.

Zehringer is a graduate of Fort Recovery High School, and calls Fort Recovery home. A former owner of Meiring Poultry and Fish farm, Zehringer has made a career out of agriculture. While in elected office, much of his agenda focused greatly on agricultural efforts, and for a time, he served as ranking minority member of the Agriculture and Natural Resources Committee. With Republicans winning the gubernatorial election in 2010, Zehringer was chosen to lead the Department of Agriculture by John Kasich. In 2011 John Kasich appointed Zehringer to the Ohio Department of Natural Resources.

As director of ODNR, Zehringer oversaw many accomplishments for the department, including completing the new dam at Buckeye Lake two years early and $43M under budget, starting the purchase of almost 60,000 acres of wilderness called AEP's RE-creation land, millions of dollars invested in state parks starting with the $88.5M of capitol improvements announced in 2014, and multiyear and lifetime hunting and fishing licenses. Zehringer retired at the end of his term in 2019 and Mary Mertz was appointed by incoming Governor Mike DeWine as the new director of ODNR.
