= Gene Slagle =

American politician

Member of the Ohio Senate from the 26th district
- In office January 3, 1973-December 31, 1976
- Preceded by: Robin Turner
- Succeeded by: Paul Pfeifer

Personal details
- Born: November 20, 1914 Crawford County, Ohio
- Died: December 16, 2006 (aged 92) Marion, Ohio
- Party: Democratic

Gene Slagle (November 20, 1914 – December 16, 2006) was a member of the Ohio Senate. He served from 1973 to 1976, representing the 26th District, which encompasses much of North-Central Ohio.
