= 127th Ohio General Assembly =

The One Hundred Twenty-seventh Ohio General Assembly was the legislative body of the state of Ohio in 2007 and 2008. The biennium corresponded with the final days the Bob Taft administration, and the first two years of Ted Strickland's tenure as Ohio Governor. The districts were drawn in accordance to the 2000 United States census and the 2002 redistricting process. Both the Ohio Senate and Ohio House of Representatives were retained by the Ohio Republican Party.

== Major events ==
=== Vacancies ===
- January 2, 2007: Representative Keith Faber (R-77th) resigns to take a seat in the Ohio Senate.
- January 28, 2007: Senator Kimberly Zurz (D-28th) resigns to become Director of Commerce for Governor Ted Strickland.
- April 29, 2007: Representative Kenneth Carano (D-59th) resigns to become a member of the cabinet of Governor Ted Strickland.
- October 9, 2007: Senator Patricia Clancy (R-8th) resigns.
- October 9, 2007: Representative Bill Seitz (R-30th) resigns to take a seat in the Ohio Senate.
- December 12, 2007: Representative William J. Healy II (D-52nd) resigns to become mayor of Canton, Ohio.
- December 13, 2007: Representative Bob Latta (R-6th) resigns to become a member of the United States House of Representatives.
- December 31, 2007: Representative Robert J. Otterman (D-45th) resigns.
- January 9, 2008: Senator Randy Gardner (R-2nd) resigns to take a seat in the Ohio House of Representatives.
- January 15, 2008: Representative Mark Wagoner (R-46th) resigns to take a seat in the Ohio Senate.
- March 31, 2008: Representative George Distel (D-99th) resigns.
- April 28, 2008: Representative Matt Barrett (D-58th) resigns due to involvement with a scandal involving school children and pornography.
- May 28, 2008: Representative John Widowfield (R-42nd) resigns.
- August 15, 2008: Representative Jim Raussen (R-28th) resigns.
- September 16, 2008: Senator Lance Mason (D-25th) resigns to take a seat on the Cuyahoga County Court of Common Pleas.
- October 31, 2008: Senator Jeff Jacobson (R-6th) resigns.
- November 2, 2008: Senator Robert Spada (R-24th) resigns.
- December 31, 2008: Senator John Boccieri (D-33rd) resigns to take a seat in the United States House of Representatives.

=== Appointments ===
- January 2, 2007: Appointment of Keith Faber as Senator of the 12th District due to the resignation of Jim Jordan.
- January 2, 2007: Appointment of Jason Wilson as Senator of the 30th District due to the resignation of Charlie Wilson.
- January 2, 2007: Appointment of Capri Cafaro as Senator of the 32nd District due to the resignation of Marc Dann.
- February 20, 2007: Appointment of Thomas C. Sawyer as Senator of the 28th District due to the resignation of Kimberly Zurz.
- February 20, 2007: Appointment of Jim Zehringer as Representative of the 77th District due to the resignation of Keith Faber.
- May 1, 2007: Appointment of Ron Gerberry as Representative of the 59th District due to the resignation of Kenneth Carano.
- October 9, 2007: Appointment of Robert Mecklenborg as Representative of the 30th District due to the resignation of Bill Seitz.
- October 10, 2007: Appointment of Bill Seitz as Senator of the 8th District due to the resignation of Patricia Clancy.
- January 8, 2008: Appointment of John Otterman as Representative of the 45th District due to the resignation of Robert J. Otterman.
- January 10, 2008: Appointment of Randy Gardner as Representative of the 6th District due to the resignation of Bob Latta.
- January 15, 2008: Appointment of Mark Wagoner as Senator of the 2nd District due to the resignation of Randy Gardner.
- January 15, 2008: Appointment of Barbara Sears as Representative of the 46th District due to the resignation of Mark Wagoner.
- March 11, 2008: Appointment of Stephen Slesnick as Representative of the 52nd District due to the resignation of William J. Healy II.
- May 21, 2008: Appointment of Deborah Newcomb as Representative of the 99th District due to the resignation of George Distel.
- May 21, 2008: Appointment of Tom Heydinger as Representative of the 58th District due to the resignation of Matt Barrett.
- June 10, 2008: Appointment of Richard Nero as Representative of the 42nd District due to the resignation of John Widowfield.
- September 17, 2008: Appointment of Nina Turner as Senator of the 25th District due to the resignation of Lance Mason.
- November 18, 2008: Appointment of Peggy Lehner as Senator of the 6th District to serve as a placeholder.
- November 18, 2008: Appointment of Tom Patton as Senator of the 24th District due to the resignation of Robert Spada.
- December 5, 2008: Appointment of Andrew Ciarfardini as Representative of the 28th District as a placeholder.

== Senate ==
| Affiliation | Party (Shading indicates majority caucus) | | Total | |
| Affiliation | Republican | Democratic | Total | Vacant |
|---|---|---|---|---|
| End of previous legislature | 22 | 11 | 33 | 0 |
| Begin | 21 | 12 | 33 | 0 |
| Latest voting share | 63.6% | 36.4% | | |

=== Leadership ===
==== Majority leadership ====
- President of the Senate: Bill Harris
- President pro tempore of the Senate: Jeff Jacobson (January 2007-November 2008)
- Floor Leader: Randy Gardner (January 2007-January 2008) Tom Niehaus (January 2008-December 2008)
- Assistant Majority Floor Leader: Robert Spada (January 2007-December 2008)
- Whip: Steve Austria

==== Minority leadership ====
- Leader: Teresa Fedor (January 2007-January 2008), Ray Miller (January 2008-December 2008)
- Assistant Leader: Tom Roberts (January 2007-January 2008), Shirley Smith (January 2008-)
- Whip: Ray Miller (January 2007-January 2008), Lance Mason (January 2008-October 2008)
- Assistant Whip: Lance Mason (January 2007-January 2008), Capri Cafaro (January 2008-December 2008)

=== Members of the 127th Ohio Senate ===
| District | Senator | Party | Residence | First elected | Term limited |
|---|---|---|---|---|---|
| 1 | Steve Buehrer | Republican | Delta | 2006 | 2014 |
| 2 | Mark Wagoner | Republican | Toledo | 2008 (Appt.) | 2016 |
| 3 | David Goodman | Republican | New Albany | 2001 (Appt.) | 2010 |
| 4 | Gary Cates | Republican | West Chester | 2004 | 2012 |
| 5 | Tom Roberts | Democratic | Dayton | 2002 (Appt.) | 2010 |
| 6 | Peggy Lehner | Republican | Kettering | 2008 (Appt.) | 2016 |
| 7 | Robert Schuler | Republican | Cincinnati | 2002 | 2010 |
| 8 | Bill Seitz | Republican | Cincinnati | 2007 (Appt.) | 2016 |
| 9 | Eric Kearney | Democratic | Cincinnati | 2005 (Appt.) | 2014 |
| 10 | Steve Austria | Republican | Beavercreek | 2000 | 2008 |
| 11 | Teresa Fedor | Democratic | Toledo | 2002 | 2010 |
| 12 | Keith Faber | Republican | Celina | 2007 (Appt.) | 2016 |
| 13 | Sue Morano | Democratic | Lorain | 2006 | 2014 |
| 14 | Tom Niehaus | Republican | New Richmond | 2004 | 2012 |
| 15 | Ray Miller | Democratic | Columbus | 2002 | 2010 |
| 16 | Steve Stivers | Republican | Columbus | 2003 (Appt.) | 2012 |
| 17 | John Carey | Republican | Wellston | 2002 | 2010 |
| 18 | Timothy Grendell | Republican | Chesterland | 2004 | 2012 |
| 19 | Bill Harris | Republican | Ashland | 2000 (Appt.) | 2010 |
| 20 | Joy Padgett | Republican | Coshocton | 2004 | 2012 |
| 21 | Shirley Smith | Democratic | Cleveland | 2006 | 2014 |
| 22 | Ron Amstutz | Republican | Wooster | 2000 | 2008 |
| 23 | Dale Miller | Democratic | Cleveland | 2006 (Appt.) | 2014 |
| 24 | Tom Patton | Republican | Strongsville | 2008 (Appt.) | 2016 |
| 25 | Nina Turner | Democratic | Cleveland | 2008 (Appt.) | 2018 |
| 26 | Larry Mumper | Republican | Loudonville | 1997 (Appt.) | 2008 |
| 27 | Kevin Coughlin | Republican | Cuyahoga Falls | 2001 (Appt.) | 2010 |
| 28 | Tom Sawyer | Democratic | Akron | 2007 (Appt.) | 2016 |
| 29 | Kirk Schuring | Republican | Canton | 2002 | 2010 |
| 30 | Jason Wilson | Democratic | Columbiana | 2007 (Appt.) | 2016 |
| 31 | Tim Schaffer | Republican | Lancaster | 2006 | 2014 |
| 32 | Capri Cafaro | Democratic | Hubbard | 2007 (Appt.) | 2016 |
| 33 | John Boccieri | Democratic | New Middletown | 2007 | 2014 |

== House of Representatives ==
=== Composition ===
| Affiliation | Party (Shading indicates majority caucus) | | Total | |
| Affiliation | Democratic | Republican | Total | Vacant |
|---|---|---|---|---|
| End of previous legislature | 38 | 60 | 99 | 0 |
| Begin | 46 | 53 | 99 | 0 |
| Latest voting share | 46.5% | 53.5% | | |

=== Leadership ===
==== Majority leadership ====
- Speaker of the House: Jon Husted
- President pro tempore of the Senate: Kevin DeWine
- Floor Leader: Larry L. Flowers
- Assistant Majority Floor Leader: Jim Carmichael
- Majority Whip: Bill Seitz (January 2007-August 2007)
- Assistant Majority Whip: Michelle G. Schneider

==== Minority leadership ====
- Leader: Joyce Beatty
- Assistant Leader: Todd Book
- Whip: Steve Driehaus
- Assistant Whip: Fred Strahorn

=== Members of the 127th Ohio House of Representatives ===
| District | Representative | Party | Residence | First elected | Term limited |
|---|---|---|---|---|---|
| 1 | Linda Bolon | Democrat | East Palestine | 2006 | 2014 |
| 2 | Jon Peterson | Republican | Delaware | 2000 | 2008 |
| 3 | Jim Carmichael | Republican | Wooster | 2000 | 2008 |
| 4 | Matt Huffman | Republican | Lima | 2006 | 2014 |
| 5 | Gerald Stebleton | Republican | Lancaster | 2006 | 2014 |
| 6 | Randy Gardner | Republican | Bowling Green | 2008 (Appt.) | 2016 |
| 7 | Kenny Yuko | Democrat | Richmond Heights | 2004 | 2012 |
| 8 | Armond Budish | Democrat | Beachwood | 2006 | 2014 |
| 9 | Barbara Boyd | Democrat | Cleveland Heights | 2006 | 2014 |
| 10 | Eugene Miller | Democrat | Cleveland | 2006 | 2014 |
| 11 | Sandra Williams | Democrat | Cleveland | 2006 | 2014 |
| 12 | Michael DeBose | Democrat | Cleveland | 2002 (Appt.) | 2010 |
| 13 | Michael J. Skindell | Democrat | Lakewood | 2002 | 2010 |
| 14 | Michael Foley | Democrat | Cleveland | 2006 (Appt.) | 2014 |
| 15 | Timothy J. DeGeeter | Democrat | Parma | 2003 (Appt.) | 2012 |
| 16 | Jennifer Brady | Democrat | Westlake | 2006 | 2014 |
| 17 | Josh Mandel | Republican | Lyndhurst | 2006 | 2014 |
| 18 | Tom Patton | Republican | Strongsville | 2002 | 2010 |
| 19 | Larry L. Flowers | Republican | Canal Winchester | 2000 | 2008 |
| 20 | Jim McGregor | Republican | Gahanna | 2001 (Appt.) | 2010 |
| 21 | Kevin Bacon | Republican | Columbus | 2006 | 2014 |
| 22 | Jim Hughes | Republican | Clintonville | 2000 | 2008 |
| 23 | Larry Wolpert | Republican | Hilliard | 2000 | 2008 |
| 24 | Ted Celeste | Democrat | Upper Arlington | 2006 | 2014 |
| 25 | Dan Stewart | Democrat | Columbus | 2002 | 2010 |
| 26 | Tracy Maxwell Heard | Democrat | Columbus | 2006 | 2014 |
| 27 | Joyce Beatty | Democrat | Columbus | 1999 (Appt.) | 2008 |
| 28 | Andrew Ciarfardini | Republican | Springdale | 2008 (Appt.) | 2018 |
| 29 | Lou Blessing | Republican | Cincinnati | 2004 | 2012 |
| 30 | Robert Mecklenborg | Republican | Cincinnati | 2007 (Appt.) | 2016 |
| 31 | Steve Driehaus | Democrat | Cincinnati | 2000 | 2008 |
| 32 | Dale Mallory | Democrat | Cincinnati | 2006 | 2014 |
| 33 | Tyrone Yates | Democrat | Cincinnati | 2002 | 2010 |
| 34 | Tom Brinkman Jr. | Republican | Cincinnati | 2000 | 2008 |
| 35 | Michelle G. Schneider | Republican | Cincinnati | 2000 | 2008 |
| 36 | Arlene Setzer | Republican | Vandalia | 2000 | 2008 |
| 37 | Jon Husted | Republican | Kettering | 2000 | 2008 |
| 38 | John White | Republican | Kettering | 2000 | 2008 |
| 39 | Clayton Luckie | Democrat | Dayton | 2006 (Appt.) | 2014 |
| 40 | Fred Strahorn | Democrat | Dayton | 2000 | 2008 |
| 41 | Brian Williams | Democrat | Akron | 2004 | 2012 |
| 42 | Richard Nero | Republican | Cuyahoga Falls | 2008 (Appt.) | 2016 |
| 43 | Steve Dyer | Democrat | Green | 2006 | 2014 |
| 44 | Vernon Sykes | Democrat | Akron | 2006 | 2014 |
| 45 | John Otterman | Democrat | Akron | 2008 (Appt.) | 2016 |
| 46 | Barbara Sears | Republican | Sylvania | 2008 (Appt.) | 2016 |
| 47 | Peter Ujvagi | Democrat | Toledo | 2002 | 2010 |
| 48 | Edna Brown | Democrat | Toledo | 2001 (Appt.) | 2010 |
| 49 | Matt Szollosi | Democrat | Toledo | 2006 | 2014 |
| 50 | John Hagan | Republican | Canton | 2000 | 2008 |
| 51 | Scott Oelslager | Republican | Canton | 2002 | 2010 |
| 52 | Stephen Slesnick | Democrat | Canton | 2008 (Appt.) | 2016 |
| 53 | Shawn Webster | Republican | Millville | 2000 | 2008 |
| 54 | Courtney Combs | Republican | Hamilton | 2004 (Appt.) | 2012 |
| 55 | Bill Coley | Republican | West Chester Twp. | 2004 | 2012 |
| 56 | Joseph Koziura | Democrat | Lorain | 2001 (Appt.) | 2010 |
| 57 | Matt Lundy | Democrat | Elyria | 2006 | 2014 |
| 58 | Tom Heydinger | Democrat | Norwalk | 2008 (Appt.) | 2016 |
| 59 | Ron Gerberry | Democrat | Austintown | 2007 (Appt.) | 2016 |
| 60 | Bob Hagan | Democrat | Youngstown | 2006 | 2014 |
| 61 | Mark Okey | Democrat | Carrollton | 2006 | 2014 |
| 62 | Lorraine Fende | Democrat | Willowick | 2004 | 2012 |
| 63 | Carol-Ann Schindel | Republican | Mentor | 2006 | 2014 |
| 64 | Tom Letson | Democrat | Warren | 2006 | 2014 |
| 65 | Sandra Harwood | Democrat | Niles | 2002 | 2010 |
| 66 | Joe Uecker | Republican | Loveland | 2004 | 2012 |
| 67 | Shannon Jones | Republican | Springboro | 2006 | 2014 |
| 68 | Kathleen Chandler | Democrat | Kent | 2002 | 2010 |
| 69 | William G. Batchelder | Republican | Medina | 2006 | 2014 |
| 70 | Kevin DeWine | Republican | Beavercreek | 2000 | 2008 |
| 71 | Jay Hottinger | Republican | Newark | 2006 | 2014 |
| 72 | Ross McGregor | Republican | Springfield | 2005 (Appt.) | 2014 |
| 73 | Jay Goyal | Democrat | Mansfield | 2006 | 2014 |
| 74 | Bruce Goodwin | Republican | Defiance | 2006 | 2014 |
| 75 | Lynn Wachtmann | Republican | Napoleon | 2006 | 2014 |
| 76 | Cliff Hite | Republican | Findlay | 2006 | 2014 |
| 77 | Jim Zehringer | Republican | Fort Recovery | 2007 (Appt.) | 2016 |
| 78 | John Adams | Republican | Sidney | 2006 | 2014 |
| 79 | Diana Fessler | Republican | New Carlisle | 2000 | 2008 |
| 80 | Chris Redfern | Democrat | Port Clinton | 1999 (Appt.) | 2008 |
| 81 | Jeff Wagner | Republican | Sycamore | 2002 | 2010 |
| 82 | Steve Reinhard | Republican | Bucyrus | 2000 | 2008 |
| 83 | Tony Core | Republican | Marysville | 2000 | 2008 |
| 84 | Chris Widener | Republican | Springfield | 2002 | 2010 |
| 85 | John M. Schlichter | Republican | Washington Court House | 2002 | 2010 |
| 86 | David T. Daniels | Republican | Greenfield | 2002 | 2010 |
| 87 | Clyde Evans | Republican | Rio Grande | 2002 | 2010 |
| 88 | Danny Bubp | Republican | West Union | 2004 | 2012 |
| 89 | Todd Book | Democrat | McDermott | 2002 | 2010 |
| 90 | Thom Collier | Republican | Mount Vernon | 2000 (Appt.) | 2008 |
| 91 | Dan Dodd | Democrat | Hebron | 2006 | 2014 |
| 92 | Jimmy Stewart | Republican | Athens | 2002 | 2010 |
| 93 | Jennifer Garrison | Democrat | Marietta | 2004 | 2012 |
| 94 | Jim Aslanides | Republican | Coshocton | 1999 (Appt.) | 2008 |
| 95 | John Domenick | Democrat | Smithfield | 2002 | 2010 |
| 96 | Allan Sayre | Democrat | Dover | 2004 | 2012 |
| 97 | Bob Gibbs | Republican | Lakeville | 2003 | 2010 |
| 98 | Matt Dolan | Republican | Chagrin Falls | 2004 | 2012 |
| 99 | Deborah Newcomb | Democrat | Conneaut | 2008 (Appt.) | 2016 |

Appt.- Member was appointed to current House Seat

== See also ==
- Ohio House of Representatives membership, 126th General Assembly
- Ohio House of Representatives membership, 125th General Assembly
- List of Ohio state legislatures
