= Bruce Johnson (Ohio politician) =

American politician (born 1960)

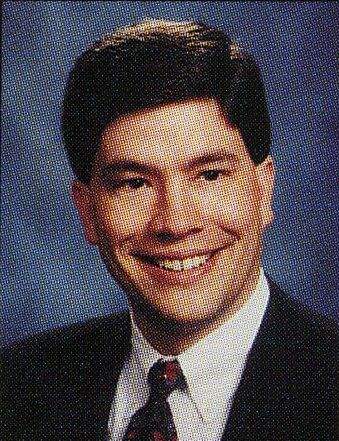

63rd Lieutenant Governor of Ohio
- In office January 5, 2005 – December 8, 2006
- Governor: Bob Taft
- Preceded by: Jennette Bradley
- Succeeded by: Lee Fisher

Member of the Ohio Senate from the 3rd district
- In office March 1, 1994 – September 18, 2001
- Preceded by: Ted Gray
- Succeeded by: David Goodman

Personal details
- Born: May 25, 1960 (age 66) Columbus, Ohio, U.S.
- Party: Republican
- Spouse: Kelly Brown
- Profession: Lawyer, politician

Bruce Edward Johnson (born May 25, 1960) is an American lawyer and Republican politician who was appointed the State of Ohio's 63rd lieutenant governor on January 5, 2005, to complete an unexpired term. Johnson concurrently served as Director of the Ohio Department of Development.

Johnson entered politics in Columbus, becoming Greg Lashutka's chief of staff after he managed Lashutka's successful 1991 campaign for mayor of Columbus. Johnson left that post when he was appointed to the Ohio Senate in 1994. After being elected to two terms and rising to the second highest post in the Senate, in 2001, Governor Bob Taft asked Johnson to join his cabinet as Director of the Ohio Department of Development. In 2005, Taft appointed him lieutenant governor. In December 2006, Johnson resigned a month before his term ended.

== Background ==
Johnson graduated from Bowling Green State University in Bowling Green, Ohio with a bachelor of arts degree in economics before attending law school at Capital University in Columbus where he received his Juris Doctor degree in 1985. While at Bowling Green, he became a member of Delta Tau Delta International Fraternity. He was admitted to the Ohio bar on November 4, 1985. After a year as an assistant city prosecutor in Columbus, he joined the firm of Chester, Willcox, and Saxbe in Columbus working there until 2001.

In 1991, Johnson was the campaign manager for Greg Lashutka's successful mayoral run in Columbus and became his chief of staff when Lashutka was sworn in. Johnson served in City Hall from 1992 to 1994. During this time, he helped abolish the city's Human Services Department and reorganize the city's operations.

He is presently a resident of the Columbus suburb of Westerville. He and his wife, Kelley have four children.

== Enters the Ohio Senate ==
Johnson was appointed by the Senate Republican caucus to the Third District Ohio Senate seat in the 120th General Assembly effective March 1, 1994, replacing Theodore W. Gray, a Republican of Upper Arlington who resigned after forty-three years in the Senate. The seat represented the eastern third of Franklin County, the suburbs of Columbus and the municipalities of Bexley, Canal Winchester, Obetz, New Albany, Whitehall, Gahanna, Reynoldsburg and Westerville, part of Worthington, and a sliver of the northern edge of the county. Johnson took the oath from Ohio Chief Justice Thomas J. Moyer.

Johnson ran for a full term that year and was unopposed in the May 3 primary, after Linda S. Reidelbach, an unsuccessful independent candidate for Congress in the 15th District in 1992, withdrew from the race despite filing nominating petitions. Johnson received 15,271 votes in the primary. On November 8, he faced Democratic nominee Christina L. Cox, a trustee in Blendon Township. Cox was also unopposed in her primary. She filed a complaint with the Ohio Elections Commission because Johnson ran television advertisements calling for voters to "re-elect" him. "A key issue in this campaign is the fact that Bruce Johnson has never been elected to anything." Cox told The Columbus Dispatch. "He was appointed by the Downtown influence peddlers, but he's trying to make the people think they elected him." However Johnson won the endorsement of the Dispatch. Johnson won the general election, 53,290 (61.78%) to 38,974 (38.22%).

=== First term work ===
Johnson in 1995 called for reform of tax incentives and financing for corporations, saying it was political and unfair. "Why do we want to subsidize one competitor over another?" he asked... "I believe the market should dictate where the jobs will be," he told The Columbus Dispatch. He sponsored legislation that would limit prisoners given a sentence of death to a single appeal and to speed up the appellate process by eliminating review by the district courts of appeal. (The latter was authorized by a constitutional amendment approved by voters in 1994.) The legislation passed the Senate and House easily and was signed by Governor George V. Voinovich.

Johnson in 1996 chaired a special committee examining tort reform. The resulting bill which passed the Senate, would in the words of The Columbus Dispatch, "cap noneconomic and punitive damages, impose additional time limits for filing lawsuits and protect defendants in multidefendant cases from being liable for unpaid portions of a judgment." The minority party was unhappy, the paper reported, "Democrats blasted Republicans, saying they were catering to business at the expense of the victims of their negligence." Senator Jeffrey D. Johnson, a Cleveland Democrat said "Somewhere along the way we have shifted away from concern for the victim to concern for business," but Bruce Johnson defended the legislation. "What we've done is tried to strike a balance. Lawsuit abuse threatens to close the doors of many small businesses in our state."

To make it easier for cities to take property owners to court for violations of zoning and building codes, Johnson in 1997 introduced legislation to let zoning officers issue tickets similar to traffic tickets from the police. "We need to protect neighborhoods against landlords and people who don't keep up their property," he told The Columbus Dispatch. The City of Columbus had requested help because it claimed the existing process of going to criminal court was too slow.

In the 1996 presidential primaries, Johnson supported former Tennessee governor Lamar Alexander.

In the Senate Johnson became chairman of the Judiciary Committee in July 1995 when the committee's chairman, Senator Barry Levey, a Republican of Middletown, retired. Johnson was the youngest-ever chairman of the Judiciary Committee. In the 122nd General Assembly (the 1997–1998 session), he chose to retain that post after dropping out of the race for majority whip, the fourth ranking post in the Republican leadership. He also was chairman of the Ways and Means Committee before entering the Senate leadership in 1999 and had been a member of the Legislative Ethics Committee.

== Runs in Columbus ==
Johnson in 1997 sought election to a four-year term as Columbus city attorney, who prosecutes misdemeanors within the city limits, defends the city in civil cases, and acts as the city's chief legal advisor with a budget of about $7 million with 140 employees. Johnson was endorsed by the Franklin County Republican Party and, as no other Republican filed, did not face a primary election. "Of all the jobs that are out there, that's the one I'm most qualified for right now," he told The Columbus Dispatch in January. He faced Janet E. Jackson, a former municipal court judge appointed by the city council that month to complete the term of Ron O'Brien, who had been elected Franklin County Prosecuting Attorney.

Johnson ran what The Dispatch characterized as an "aggressive" campaign on television and in debates. Among Johnson's concerns was that Jackson had been settling civil suits against the city too readily and for too much money and that she had been lax in prosecuting parents who failed to make child support payments. "I would be a deadbeat parent's worst nightmare," Johnson bragged. However, Jackson noted that no child support cases had been filed with her office and she could not be blamed for failing to hold parents accountable.

The Dispatch described one ad: "a man is shown attacking a woman in a kitchen as an announcer cites domestic violence statistics from Jackson's office" that she had dismissed or plea bargained 96 per cent of domestic violence cases. Jackson said of the commercial "It's base," she said. "It was meant to elicit a reaction," but Johnson countered "What she's afraid about is that people will find out that an outrageous number of domestic violence cases are dismissed or plea bargained. The outrage is the facts, not me bringing them up." The Dispatch called Johnson a "worthy opponent" to Jackson, but endorsed her, citing her experience and her "commitment to professionalism and nonpartisanship." Despite spending $265,900 on his campaign, Johnson lost the November 4 election, winning 41 per cent to Jackson's 59 per cent.

Jackson was disappointed with her opponent, telling The Dispatch after her victory "the senator and I talked early about running positive campaigns. Unfortunately, his campaign ended up being about half-truths and half-statements."

== Continues Senate service ==
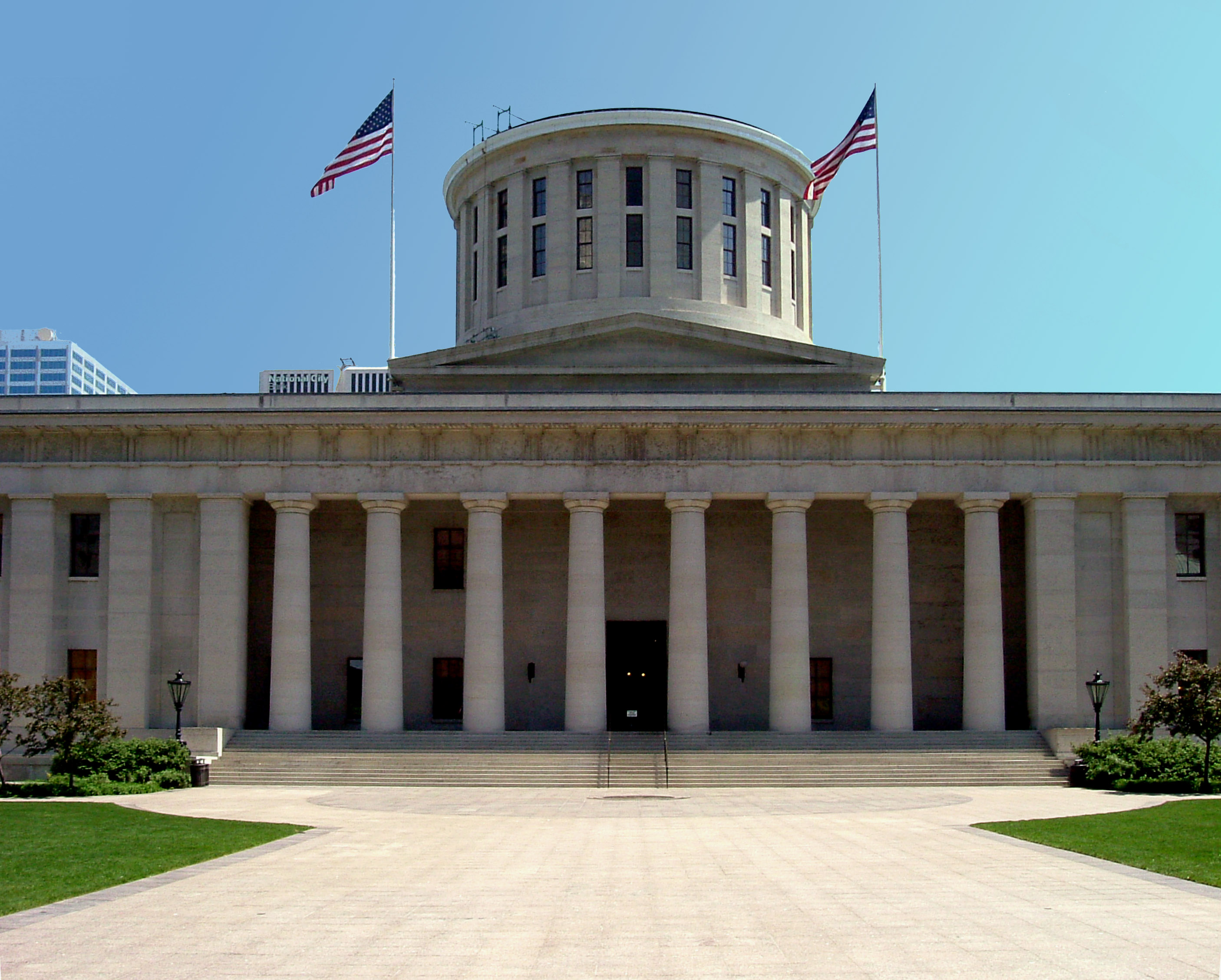
The Ohio Statehouse in Columbus where the Ohio Senate meets.

In 1998, he sought re-election to his Senate seat. He was again unopposed in the Republican primary, held on May 5 in which he received 20,130 votes. The Columbus Dispatch endorsed him in the fall, editorializing:

During the past four years, no senator was more active or as deeply involved in as many major issues as Johnson... A legislative whirlwind, he personally sponsored numerous bills and shepherded others into law... By any measure, this legislative record is substantive and valuable to central Ohio and the state... Johnson is respected and trusted on both sides of the aisle. His accomplishments are remarkable for someone just 38 years old. He fully deserves another term.

In the general election on November 3, he faced Democrat Debra A. Payne, a small businesswoman who owned a data-processing firm and was a three-term councilwoman in Gahanna. Payne told The Columbus Dispatch "I went door to door and asked, 'Do you know who your state senator is?' They said, 'I have no idea,' and I said, 'That's why you need me.' " Johnson defeated her by a vote of 53,074 (54.79%) to 43,796 (45.21%), a decreased margin of seven percent from 1994. After his reelection, the Senate Republican caucus elected him assistant president pro tempore, the third ranking post in the GOP leadership, defeating fellow a Franklin County senator, Eugene Watts of Dublin, who sought another term in that post.

In December 1998, Columbus Mayor Greg Latshukta announced he would not seek a third term in 1999. Johnson briefly considered a run for the seat, but decided against it. The same month, Johnson told The Columbus Dispatch he was investigating overturning the city council's vote to grant benefits to domestic partners of city employers, according them the same treatment as spouses. Johnson objected to the idea itself, the cost, and the manner in which the question was rushed through the council without any public notice or debate. "No matter what you think of the merits, the process on an issue they knew could raise serious questions from the public was circumvented," said Johnson.

=== Concerned with protecting children ===
Johnson was strongly anti-abortion. In 2000, he sponsored legislation allowing mothers to leave a newborn baby at a hospital, police station, and like public facilities without fear of criminal charges. "I believe this bill is pro-life because it protects the life of a child regardless of the actions of its parents. I only wish we could protect babies earlier," he told The Plain Dealer.

In 2000, Johnson sponsored legislation that would require background checks for volunteers working in private groups, claiming "This turns the spotlight on the leeches of our society who are preying on our children." The proposal met stiff opposition, being labeled an "inquisition" by The Toledo Blade and was denounced by The Plain Dealer "as a tool for harassment, and would be a disincentive to thousands of civic-minded, morally upright Ohioans who volunteer to work with children." "This bill can impose a life sentence prohibiting service to the youth of our community resulting from discovery of a listed felony conviction at any time in a person's life," Christine Nardecchia, president of the Volunteer Administrators' Network of Central Ohio told The Toledo Blade. Johnson was also concerned with children's health, introducing legislation in 2000 to require all children twelve and under to be vaccinated against chicken pox. Johnson sponsored legislation to allow mothers to breast feed their children in public.

=== Utility deregulation spearheaded ===
Electricity deregulation legislation occupied the General Assembly from 1997 to 1999. In early 1997 Johnson and Representative Priscilla D. Mead, a Republican from Upper Arlington, were named co-chairmen of the General Assembly's Joint Committee on Electric Utility Deregulation. Johnson was the chief sponsor of the proposal and worked hard to shepherd it through the legislature. The plan faced an uphill fight against the utility industry and advocates for consumers. "The proposed legislation provides utilities adequate revenue to make the transition to a competitive market. It will not result in any consumers' paying more for electricity," he promised his colleagues in the General Assembly, worried about increasing their constituents' bills. Johnson called his plan "a reasonable and fair approach" and ultimately prevailing, Johnson successfully passing the legislation into law in 1999.

=== Sealing Senate records ===
Johnson was strongly criticized for his 2001 attempt to repeal the reach of Ohio's sunshine law that made state records available to the public, a proposal contained in the massive state budget bill. Darrell Rowland of The Columbus Dispatch described Johnson's idea: "The obscure proposal–two dozen lines in a 58,936-line bill–would prevent subpoenas of legislative staff members and their communications with legislators. The bill also would keep secret any legislative documents not deemed public records–a broad category because the General Assembly already concealed much of that material from public view two years ago."

William L. Phillis, executive director of the Coalition for Equity and Adequacy, a group of public schools suing the State of Ohio for more funding, told the newspaper "This is not something you expect in a democracy. You might expect this kind of behavior from a third-world dictator, one that would want to hide wrongdoing by making a decree that makes it right." Johnson told The Dispatch "I need unlimited, unfettered discretion to seek every fact I can find in order to come to a decent conclusion. What we want to do is make sure the senators and representatives are competently representing the will of the people." The senator also claimed seventeenth-century English common law justified his plan.

Thomas C. Drabick Jr. of Blacklick said in a letter to the editor published in The Dispatch "He has unlimited and unfettered arrogance. Who does he think he works for? Clearly, he does not believe that he is responsible to the people of Ohio; otherwise, he would not seek to keep secrets from us." The Dispatch agreed, editorializing that "Government decisions made in secret aren't necessarily better decisions, they're just secret decisions. Unfortunately, too many of Ohio's legislative leaders seem sold on the idea that keeping things hush-hush is good." Nevertheless, the Senate passed Johnson's proposal, part of the state budget, over attempts by the Democratic minority to remove the language from the bill.

=== Other legislative work ===
Johnson was a critic of the United States Congress's efforts to force states, under penalty of losing federal highway money, to lower the blood alcohol level considered driving under the influence. Johnson suggested that at the new lower limit, "We could give that level a $100 fine, or call it driving under federal blackmail." He also sponsored legislation to increase the hours of driving sixteen-year-olds needed to obtain a driver's license and saw it enacted into law.

Johnson opposed efforts to locate state offices outside of Columbus, defeating a bill in committee in 1998. Johnson declared of the defeat "the people of the state are the winners, not Toledo, not Marietta, not Columbus." In 1999, he obtained Senate passage of a resolution commending "Neighbors Day". As part of the debate, he sang the theme song to Mister Rogers' Neighborhood on the Senate floor. That year he also sponsored legislation to declare the northern largemouth bass the official state fish. The Columbus Dispatch after his resignation referred to his "blunt, opinionated style."

Johnson also served as President Pro Tempore of the Senate, the second ranking position in the body, which he held when he left to enter Governor Taft's cabinet. He was chairman of the Finance and Financial Institutions Committee until his resignation.

== Appointed Development Director ==
On August 28, 2001, Johnson being ineligible for a third term under Ohio's term limits law, Governor Taft appointed him director of the Ohio Department of Development to replace C. Lee Johnson, who had resigned the previous December. "His experience as a capable manager and knowledge of utility issues, tax policies, economic development, and the law make him an excellent choice" said Taft. The department, with a staff of five hundred and a half-billion dollar budget, is charged with promoting economic development in Ohio, attracting new industry, and promoting tourism in the state. Johnson resigned from his Senate seat on September 17 and David Goodman, a 34-year-old member of the Ohio House was appointed by the Senate Republican caucus in Johnson's place. Upon his departure, Johnson told his colleagues "I hope to make you proud, and I hope to pick your pocket."

Johnson's hometown paper, The Columbus Dispatch, hailed the choice saying "Taft picked a pro in Bruce E. Johnson" but Cleveland's The Plain Dealer, Ohio's largest newspaper, editorialized that Johnson was an "uninspired choice" with "no discernible experience in job creation." The Toledo Blade also was skeptical, writing in an editorial "he brings gusto to a job that requires verve, imagination, and the ability to turn visions into reality. He has the first. For the rest we must wait and see." The Blade also criticized Johnson's efforts to keep state offices in Columbus and opposed his ideas for spending state development funds: "Mr. Johnson's plan to target technology and biotechnology jobs suggests the same old advantage will go to the cities that get them now: Cleveland, Columbus, Cincinnati" at the expense of other neglected areas of the state. The Columbus Dispatch wrote Johnson "would seem to have little to commend him for the job, except perhaps for his degree in economics from Bowling Green State University," but he told the paper "I have the confidence of the governor."

Almost immediately there was speculation of his being promoted to the post of lieutenant governor. In November 2001, the Dayton Daily News reported there were rumors Governor Taft would name Johnson his running mate to replace Maureen O'Connor as lieutenant governor who had announced she would run for the Ohio Supreme Court in 2002. Taft, however, chose Jennette Bradley, a councilwoman from Columbus.

Johnson led the campaign advocating the Third Frontier program, a large state bond issue to finance industrial research and development, which Governor Taft had championed. Critics such as Representative Tom Brinkman, a Republican of Cincinnati, called it "corporate welfare". Johnson after its defeat by the voters in November 2003 told The Plain Dealer the plan was not dead. "There will definitely be continuing efforts to fund this strategy, because it's the right strategy. So you don't drop it. You continue to encourage state funding. But it's certainly more challenging," he said, after the failure." Johnson turned out to be right. In 2005, Johnson was the point man on the Third Frontier campaign again, but this time voters in Ohio approved State Issue One which allocated dollars to support technology and innovation. Johnson served as the Chairman of the Third Frontier Commission. In May, 2010 the voters renewed the Third Frontier once again.

As director of the Department of Development, Johnson was frequently in attendance at announcements of factory openings and expansions and was often quoted in Ohio newspapers in connection with any new employment in the state.

== As lieutenant governor ==
=== Job swaps bring Johnson to office ===
Johnson became lieutenant governor through a series of job swaps in the Republican Party, routine in the party. Hamilton County Prosecuting Attorney Michael K. Allen withdrew his name as a candidate for reelection after a sex scandal. Allen's predecessor, Ohio State Treasurer Joseph T. Deters, agreed to run as a write in candidate for his old job as scandal clouded Deters's prospects–two of his aides had been indicted. When Deters was elected, he resigned as treasurer and Governor Bob Taft then appointed Lieutenant Governor Jennette B. Bradley to Deters's post. Taft announced he would appoint Johnson to Bradley's former post on December 21, 2004, and that Johnson would continue to serve as head of the Department of Development. (Johnson announced he would not take the lieutenant governor's salary, which was about half the Development director's pay of $125,000 per annum.)

The Akron Beacon-Journal declared "the lieutenant governor's role in Columbus is typically about as exciting as drywall," as the lieutenant governor's job carries no duties except what the Governor assigns, the chief function of the office now being to provide a successor to the Governor. The Cincinnati Enquirer, a Republican paper, editorialized "Johnson and Bradley seem to be good choices for these jobs. However, the way they got the posts points out again that Ohio is clearly dominated by one political party, a situation we do not think is healthy for the state, no matter which party is in control."

When Johnson's name came before the Republican controlled General Assembly on January 4, 2005, the day after Bradley's resignation, it was the first time a governor had appointed a new lieutenant governor and consequently the legislature had no experience with such a nomination. The nomination was swiftly approved over the objections of the Democratic minority, who protested there was not sufficient opportunity to debate the question. Senator Eric Fingerhut, a Democrat from Cleveland, noted "He's a heartbeat away, a peanut away from being the governor of the state of Ohio. No, he was not elected by the people." Senate Democratic leader C. J. Prentiss of Cleveland was quoted by The Columbus Dispatch on January 5: "In essence, voters are being denied their franchise of public participation and are not having a voice in this process. This is the severity of what can happen with one-party rule, and we want to protect their interest by objecting to this charade of an unelected public official."

"We need to have a discussion and not just appoint him in ten minutes or less," said Senator Dan Brady, a Democrat from Cleveland. Brady said on the Senate floor "The majority party is playing musical chairs with statewide offices in this state. We have to have some type of process." The Beacon-Journal was also skeptical of "the latest round of musical chairs among Republican officeholders in Columbus." Nevertheless, the General Assembly passed House Joint Resolution 1, which confirmed Johnson, on January 4, 2005, by 97–0 in the House and 22-11 in the Senate. Taft told the crowd at the swearing on January 5, "Bruce has been actively engaged in designing our program for jobs creation, tax reform and economic development. It is primarily because of his leadership on the economy that I have chosen Bruce."

=== Work as lieutenant governor ===
Johnson actively campaigned for the tax reform plans of Governor Taft, which ultimately became law. Johnson told The News Journal in Mansfield that "Ohio's outdated tax system hinders our ability to attract new business and employment opportunities in our communities" and "What we're doing now doesn't make sense. We take the things that business people utilize and give it the highest tax rate in the nation." Michael Douglas, a writer for the Akron Beacon-Journal quoted Johnson's claim that the new business activity tax was "one of the most fair and innovative in the nation," but was highly skeptical. Douglas said "Ohio [is] fashioning its own version of a tax applied by a mere handful of states. Might Ohioans be concerned that all of this has been championed by a governor and team that botched the mandated reporting of his golf dates?"

Johnson was head of the committee promoting Taft's $2 billion state bond issue for industrial research and development and road construction on the November 2005 ballot, similar to the failed Third Frontier. Critics of the proposal called the plans "pork" and "corporate welfare" but Johnson told The Plain Dealer "World-class research creates jobs" and "We believe this issue will be victorious, mostly because it makes sense to Ohioans to have Ohio spending money to ensure that all the infrastructure in the state is preparing for the jobs of the century." The multibillion-dollar bond issue was passed by voters 1,512,669 (54.12%) to 1,282,571 (45.88%).

=== Scandal surrounds Taft ===
In 2005, Governor Bob Taft was convicted of four counts of failing to file accurate financial disclosure statements but said he would not resign his office despite the conviction, which grew out of the Coingate scandal exposed by The Toledo Blade. Johnson, who would become governor if Taft resigned, told The Plain Dealer "You don't take this appointment and go through the confirmation process without knowing that you're prepared. But I don't expect it" and said he had not spoken to Taft about becoming governor. Johnson was by The Columbus Dispatch that "It's not gonna happen. The governor is going to serve out his term. But if something were to happen, I'm prepared to serve as governor."

Representative Chris Redfern, a Democrat from Catawba Island and House minority leader told The Toledo Blade he welcomed Johnson as governor. "If Bruce Johnson were to ascend, he could offer real reform."

The Dayton Daily News was dismayed with the prospect of Johnson becoming governor.

Bruce Johnson got his job because of another scandal. This gets complicated: former Ohio State Treasurer Joe Deters saw two of his aides indicted. Damaged goods, he left in midterm to run for county prosecutor back home in Cincinnati. Gov. Taft moved then-Lt. Gov. Jennette Bradley into Mr. Deters' job by appointment, hoping she'll hold the spot for Republicans in 2006. And then the governor appointed his development director, Mr. Johnson, as lieutenant governor. The finagling has simply been rampant. For a man to become governor through that process and a gubernatorial scandal would be, uh, scandalous. Whether a new governor with that background would be even weaker than a convicted Gov. Taft is a close call. The decisive factor in determining who should be governor has to be that Gov. Taft was the one who was elected.

=== Leaving office ===
Johnson did not file to run for any office in the May 2, 2006, primary. His name was not mentioned in the public speculation as to who the leading Republican candidates for governor, Jim Petro and J. Kenneth Blackwell might pick as their running mate and was not tapped by either to continue in office. Johnson's term as lieutenant governor would have expired on January 7, 2007 but he announced on December 1, 2006 that he would resign on December 8. Governor Bob Taft did not appoint a replacement for the remaining month of the term before Lee Fisher, elected as Ted Strickland's running mate in November, took office.

Johnson currently works as the President of the Inter-University Council of Ohio.

Political offices
Preceded by Theodore W. Gray	Ohio Senator for the Third District; 1994–2001	Succeeded by David Goodman
Preceded by C. Lee Johnson	Ohio Development Director; 2001–2007	Succeeded by Lee Fisher
Preceded by Jennette Bradley	Lieutenant Governor of Ohio; 2005–2006	Succeeded by Lee Fisher
