= Gary Suhadolnik =

American politician (born 1950)

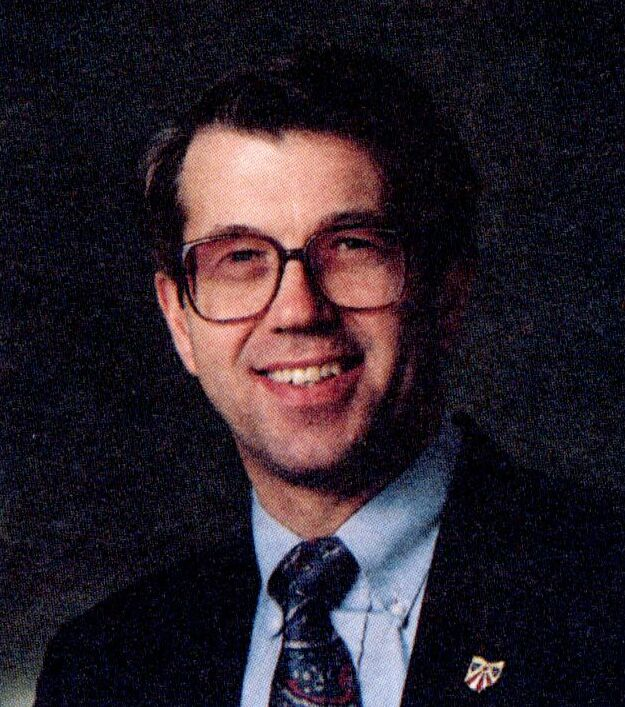

Executive Director of the Ohio Turnpike Commission
- In office January 13, 2003 – April 1, 2008
- Governor: Bob Taft; Ted Strickland
- Preceded by: Gino Zomparelli
- Succeeded by: George Distel

Director of the Ohio Department of Commerce
- In office January 5, 1999 – January 13, 2003
- Governor: Bob Taft
- Preceded by: ???
- Succeeded by: Jennette Bradley

Member of the Ohio Senate from the 24th district
- In office January 3, 1981 – January 5, 1999
- Preceded by: Jerome Stano
- Succeeded by: Robert Spada

Personal details
- Born: April 20, 1950 (age 76) Cleveland, Ohio, U.S.
- Party: Republican
- Spouse: Nancy

Gary C. Suhadolnik (born April 20, 1950) is an American politician. He is a former Republican member of the Ohio Senate who represented the 24th district from 1981 to 1999. He resigned in 1999 to take a position under Governor Bob Taft. From 2003 to 2008, he served as executive director of the Ohio Turnpike Commission.

Subsequently, he resided with his wife Nancy in Fort Myers, Florida or Cleveland, Ohio.
