= Kerry R. Metzger =

American politician

Kerry Metzger

Member of the Ohio House of Representatives from the 97th district
- In office January 3, 1995-December 31, 2002
- Preceded by: Greg DiDonato
- Succeeded by: District Eliminated

Personal details
- Party: Republican

Kerry Metzger is a former member of the Ohio House of Representatives, representing parts of Tuscarawas County and Guernsey County from 1995 to 2002. He was succeeded in 2003 by Jimmy Stewart.
