= Greg DiDonato =

American politician

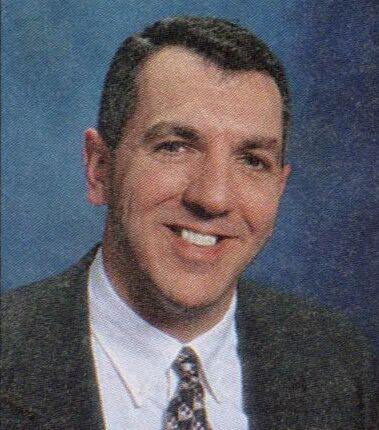

Minority Leader of the Ohio Senate
- In office February 28, 2002 – December 31, 2004
- Preceded by: Leigh Herington
- Succeeded by: C. J. Prentiss

Member of the Ohio Senate from the 30th district
- In office January 6, 1997 – December 31, 2004
- Preceded by: Rob Burch
- Succeeded by: Charlie Wilson

Member of the Ohio House of Representatives from the 97th district
- In office January 3, 1991 – December 31, 1994
- Preceded by: William Hinig
- Succeeded by: Kerry R. Metzger

Personal details
- Born: July 28, 1963 (age 63) Dennison, Ohio, United States
- Party: Democratic

Gregory L. DiDonato (born July 28, 1963) of Dennison, Ohio, is an American politician of the Democratic party. While still in high school, DiDonato was elected to the village council of Dennison, Ohio. At age 21, he was elected mayor of the Village of Dennison. He was re-elected mayor in 1987. While in college, he worked as a baker. Afterwards, he worked for a grocery distribution company. In 1990, DiDonato won a seat in the Ohio House of Representatives, serving the 97th district. In 1994, DiDonato was the Democratic nominee for a seat in the United States House of Representatives to replace retiring Democratic incumbent Douglas Applegate. DiDonato lost that race to Robert W. Ney. He was minority leader of the Ohio State Senate. He served as a delegate for John Edwards on the Ohio delegation to the 2004 Democratic National Convention in Boston. DiDonato was elected to the Ohio Senate in 1996. His most recent term ended in January 2005. He was prevented by Ohio's term limits law from seeking a third consecutive term in the Senate. DiDonato was again elected as mayor of Dennison, Ohio in 2007. He stepped down to become the chairman of Tuscarawas County Democratic Party. DiDonato once again currently serves as the Mayor of Dennison. During his current term as the mayor of Dennison, DiDonato ran a ballot issue campaign to reduce an existing voter-approved levy to decrease funding for the local school district serving the village.

DiDonato formerly served as the executive director of the Ohio Mid-Eastern Governments Association (OMEGA), stepping down in 2015 to return to Dennison as mayor.

== See also ==
- Ohio's 18th congressional district
