= Karen Gillmor =

American politician

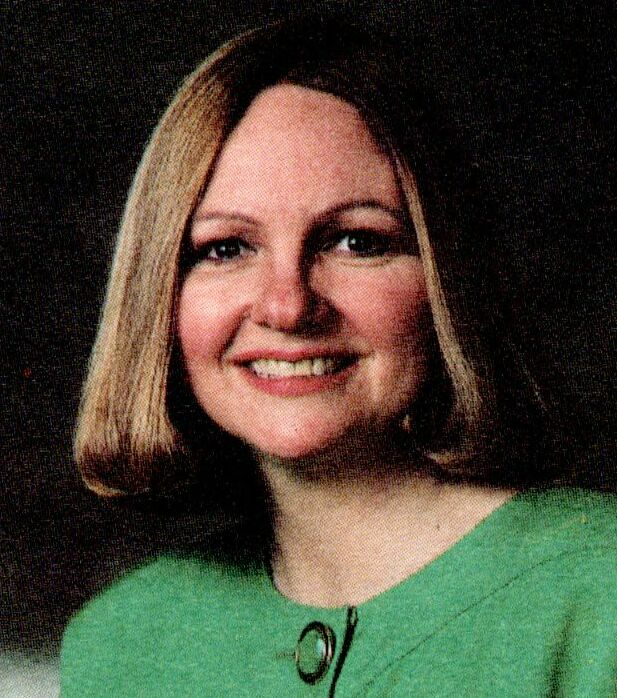

Member of the Ohio Senate from the 26th district
- In office January 5, 2009 – July 13, 2011
- Preceded by: Larry Mumper
- Succeeded by: David Burke
- In office January 3, 1993 – December 5, 1997
- Preceded by: Paul Pfeifer
- Succeeded by: Larry Mumper

Personal details
- Born: January 29, 1948 (age 78) Cleveland, Ohio, U.S.
- Party: Republican
- Spouse: Paul Gillmor (m. 1983–2007, his death)
- Education: Michigan State University, Ohio State University
- Profession: Educator

Karen Gillmor (born January 29, 1948) is a Republican politician who served in the Ohio Senate, and who now serves on the Ohio Industrial Commission. She is the widow of former U.S. Congressman Paul Gillmor.

== Life and career ==
Gillmor graduated with a Bachelor of Arts with honors from Michigan State University, and a Master of Arts and a Ph.D. from The Ohio State University. She served on the State Employment Relations Board from 1997 to 2007. She first was elected to the Ohio Senate in 1992 to succeed Paul Pfeifer, who had won election to the Ohio Supreme Court. In 1996, she was reelected, however, she resigned from her second term in 1997 to take a seat in the State Employees Relations Board.

== Return to the Ohio Senate ==
In 2008, Gillmor again ran for the Senate. However, she first faced Representative Steve Reinhard in the primary election. After receiving the endorsement of the Senate caucus, Gillmor defeated Reinhard for the nomination, with 59.88% of the vote. She defeated Democrat Tom Kruse with 63.04% of the vote.

Midway through 2011, Gillmor was mentioned as a likely contender for the Ohio Industrial Commission. Gillmor announced that she would seek the seat in early June 2011. Gillmor was up against two others for the position.

On June 10, 2011, it was announced that Gillmor would be appointed to the Industrial Commission.
