= Jim Carmichael =

American politician

Member of the Ohio House of Representatives from the 3rd district
- In office January 3, 2001 – December 31, 2008
- Preceded by: Ron Amstutz
- Succeeded by: Ron Amstutz

Wayne County Ohio Commissioner
- In office January 2, 2008 – July 13, 2016

Personal details
- Born: July 18, 1939 Washington, Pennsylvania, U.S.
- Died: July 13, 2016 (aged 76) Wooster, Ohio, U.S.
- Party: Republican
- Spouse: Carolyn
- Profession: Business management

James F. Carmichael (July 18, 1939 – July 13, 2016) was an American politician. He was a Republican member of the Ohio House of Representatives, representing the 3rd District from 2000 to 2008. He was also a commissioner for Wayne County. Carmichael died on July 12, 2016.

Born in Washington, Pennsylvania, Carmichael graduated from Shreve High School in Shreve, Ohio. Carmichael served in the Ohio Army National Guard from 1959 to 1964. He worked for the Dominion East Ohio Gas Company as a district manager. From 1971 to 1979, Carmichael served as mayor of the village of Shreve. Carmichael also served on the Wayne County Board of Elections and was chairman of the elections board.
