= Erin Sullivan =

American politician

Member of the Ohio House of Representatives from the 18th district
- In office June 23, 1998 – December 31, 2002
- Preceded by: Rocco Colonna
- Succeeded by: Tom Patton

Personal details
- Party: Democratic

Erin Sullivan was a member of the Ohio House of Representatives, serving from 1998 to 2002. Her district consisted of much of lower Cuyahoga County, Ohio. She was preceded by Tom Patton.
