= Larry Mumper =

American politician (1937–2026)

Larry A. Mumper
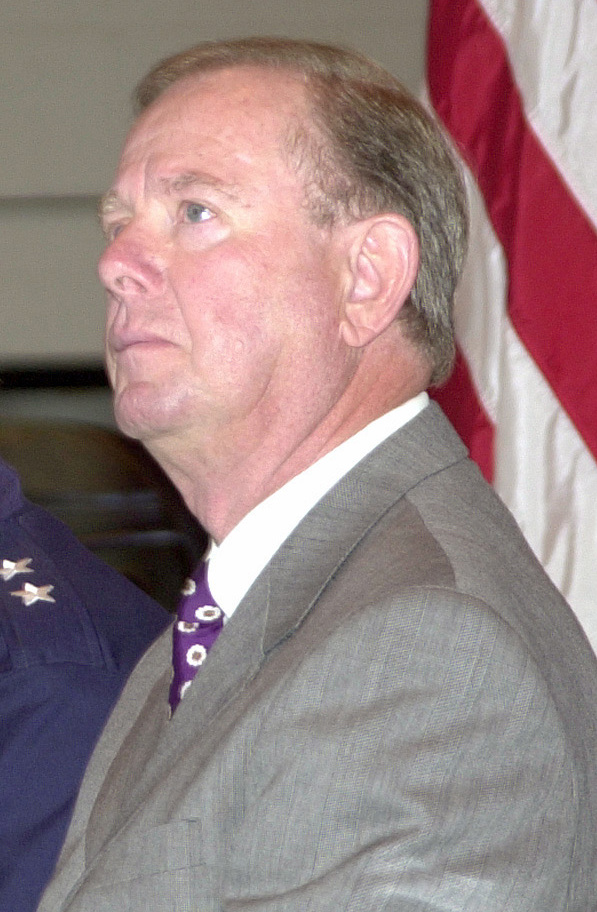

Member of the Ohio Senate from the 26th district
- In office December 5, 1997 – December 31, 2008
- Preceded by: Karen Gillmor
- Succeeded by: Karen Gillmor

Personal details
- Born: July 25, 1937 Loudonville, Ohio, U.S.
- Died: March 21, 2026 (aged 88)
- Party: Republican
- Spouse: Karyle
- Profession: Educator, realtor, farmer

Larry A. Mumper (July 25, 1937 – March 21, 2026) was an American politician who was a Republican member of the Ohio Senate, representing the 26th District from 1997 to 2008. He died on March 21, 2026, at the age of 88.
