= David Goodman (politician) =

American politician

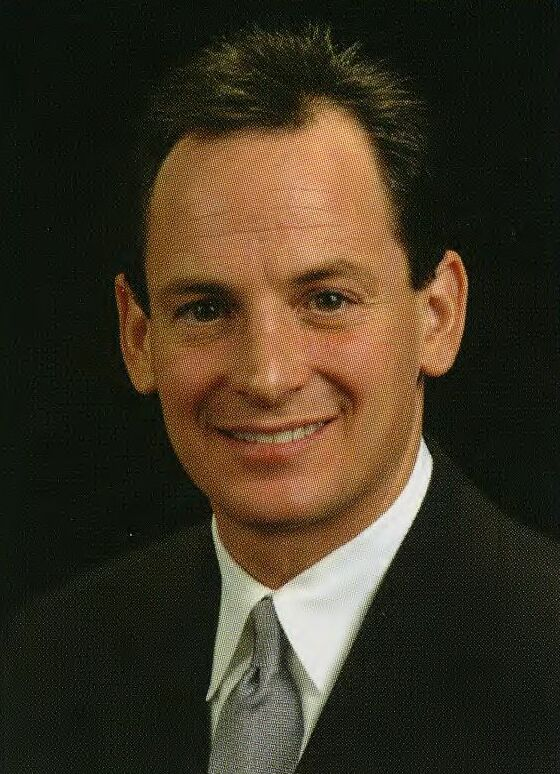

Member of the Ohio Senate from the 3rd district
- In office October 2, 2001 – December 31, 2010
- Preceded by: Bruce E. Johnson
- Succeeded by: Kevin Bacon

Member of the Ohio House of Representatives from the 25th district
- In office May 12, 1998 – October 2, 2001
- Preceded by: Jim Mason
- Succeeded by: Jim McGregor

Personal details
- Born: February 13, 1967 (age 59) Columbus, Ohio, U.S.
- Party: Republican
- Education: Miami University; Case Western Reserve University
- Profession: Attorney

David Goodman (born February 13, 1967) is Republican politician who serves as the director of the Ohio Development Services Agency, the state's economic development department. He served as the director of the Ohio Department of Commerce from January 2011 until March 2013. He has also served in both chambers of the Ohio General Assembly.

== Life and career ==
A former assistant Ohio Attorney General, he served on Bexley City Council from 1995 to 1998. Goodman was appointed to the Ohio House of Representatives in 1998 to succeed Jim Mason, who had resigned. He won election to a full term in 1998, and again in 2000. By 2001, Goodman was serving as Chairman of a Finance Subcommittee.

== Ohio Senate ==
In 2001, Senator Bruce E. Johnson resigned to become Commerce Director for Ohio Governor Bob Taft, leaving a vacancy in the Senate. Goodman was appointed to fill the remainder of his term. He was seated in the Senate on October 2, 2001. Goodman won a full term for his seat in 2002.

In 2004, Goodman ran for Franklin County Commissioner against Mary Jo Kilroy. Kilroy beat Goodman by 4% in the general election. Goodman was reelected to the Senate in 2006, and served as Chairman of the Senate Criminal Justice Committee. Goodman was again on the ballot in 2008, this time for a position on Ohio Tenth District Court of Appeals. He lost to incumbent John Conner.

By 2010, Goodman was term limited from the Senate, and left at the end of his term on December 31, 2010, after over twelve years as a legislator. Soon after Goodman left office, Ohio Governor John Kasich named him as Commerce Director for his administration. On March 18, 2013, he was appointed director of the Development Services Agency, replacing Christiane Schmenk.
