= Robert Spada =

American politician

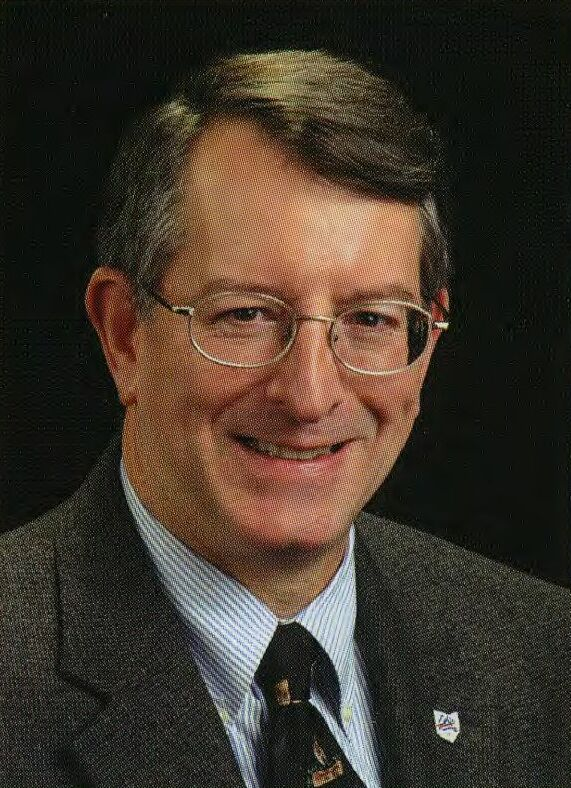

Member of the Ohio Senate from the 24th district
- In office February 2, 1999 – November 2, 2008
- Preceded by: Gary C. Suhadolnik
- Succeeded by: Tom Patton

Personal details
- Party: Republican
- Profession: Financial consultant

Robert F. Spada is a former Republican member of the Ohio Senate, representing the 24th District of the U.S. state of Ohio from 1999 to 2008.
