= Rocco Colonna =

American politician

Member of the Ohio House of Representatives from the 18th district
- In office January 3, 1975 – May 23, 1998
- Preceded by: James Celebrezze
- Succeeded by: Erin Sullivan

Personal details
- Born: November 8, 1933 Cleveland, Ohio
- Died: August 7, 2011 (aged 77) Brook Park, Ohio
- Party: Democratic

Rocco Joseph Colonna (November 8, 1933 – August 7, 2011) was an American politician, having served as a member of the Ohio House of Representatives for over 20 years.
