= Ed Jerse =

American politician (born 1959)

Member of the Ohio House of Representatives from the 7th district
- In office October 5, 1995 – December 31, 2004
- Preceded by: Ron Suster
- Succeeded by: Kenny Yuko

Personal details
- Party: Democratic
- Education: Georgetown University (B.A.); Harvard Law School (JD)

Edward S. Jerse (born 1959) is an American politician who served as a member of the Ohio House of Representatives. In 2004, he ran for the Democratic nomination for Ohio's 14th congressional district, but lost to political novice Capri S. Cafaro.

== Career ==
Jerse, who has served as a member of Euclid, Ohio's city council, has served in the Ohio House from 1995 to 2005. and was the ranking minority member of the House Committee on Finance and Appropriations. Jerse served as Assistant Prosecutor with the City of Euclid from 2005 to 2006.

In the fall of 2005, Jerse served as campaign manager for the Reform Ohio Now ballot initiatives that tried to limit the role of the Ohio Secretary of State in elections. All initiatives were defeated at the polls. Jerse served as Director of Legislative Affairs for the Ohio Department of Development under Governor Ted Strickland. Jerse also served as the Director of Regional Collaboration for the Office of the Cuyahoga County Executive, Ed FitzGerald.

== Education ==
Jerse studied at John Carroll University before earning his bachelor's degree from Georgetown University and his J.D. degree from Harvard University.
