= Ron Amstutz =

American politician

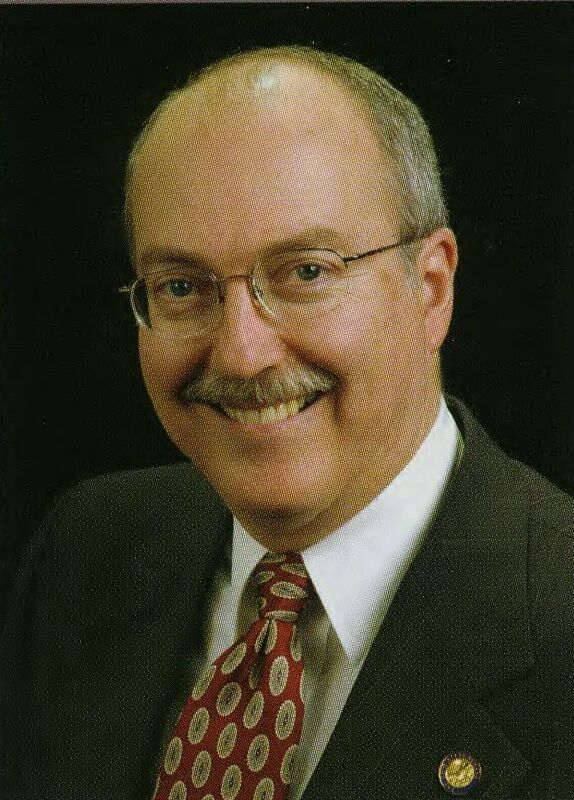

Member of the Ohio House of Representatives from the 1st district
- In office January 5, 2009 – December 31, 2016
- Preceded by: Jim Carmichael
- Succeeded by: Scott Wiggam
- In office January 3, 1981 – December 31, 2000
- Preceded by: John Johnson
- Succeeded by: Jim Carmichael

Member of the Ohio Senate from the 22nd district
- In office January 3, 2001 – December 31, 2008
- Preceded by: Grace L. Drake
- Succeeded by: Bob Gibbs

Personal details
- Born: 1952 (age 73–74)
- Party: Republican
- Education: Capital University (B.A.)
- Occupation: Writer, Photographer

Ronald Amstutz (born 1952) is the former state representative for the 1st District of the Ohio House of Representatives, serving from both 1981 to 2000, and again from 2009 to 2016. He also served as state senator for the 22nd District of the Ohio Senate and as mayor of Orrville, Ohio. In the House, he was the chairman of the House Finance & Appropriations Committee. He is a Republican.

== Life and career ==
A lifelong resident of Wayne County, Representative Amstutz was raised on a dairy farm between Dalton and Kidron. In 1971, he moved to Orrville and has lived in Wooster since 1981. He served on the Orrville City Charter Commission in 1974 and 1975. His political career began in 1976 when he was elected Mayor of the City of Orville. He held the position through 1980, when he ran successfully for the Ohio House of Representatives. Prior to his career in public service, Representative Amstutz worked for five years in the Orrville office of The Daily Record. Amstutz is a graduate of Central Christian High School and holds his bachelor's degree in government communications from Capital University.

Amstutz won his first term in the Ohio House of Representatives in 1980, replacing five term representative John Johnson. The original district was composed of all of Wayne County, and portions of Stark County and Holmes County. Term limits went into effect in Ohio in 1992, allowing legislators from that point on to only serve eight consecutive years in one chamber. With the completion of his tenth term in 2000, Amstutz was ineligible to run again in the House. However, Senator Grace L. Drake of the 22nd District of the Ohio Senate was also facing term limits. Amstutz ran for her seat, and won. He was sworn in as a state senator on January 8, 2001. In the Ohio Senate, Amstutz served as chairman of Senate Ways and Means from 2003 to 2008. In 2004, Amstutz successfully ran for reelection.

== Ohio House of Representatives ==
Amstutz initially discussed running for Congress, in the 16th Congressional District, which incumbent of 18 terms, Ralph Regula, was planning to vacate. However, he soon after decided he would return to the Ohio House of Representatives. He faced primary opposition from Charlie Hardmen, but won the election with 64% of the vote. He went on to win the general election handily. Amstutz was chosen to be Ranking Member of the House Finance and Financial Institutions Committee for the 128th General Assembly.

When Republicans regained control of the House for the 129th General Assembly, Amstutz serves as Chairman of the Finance and Appropriations Committee. He again served as Chairman in the 130th General Assembly.

=== Committee assignments ===
- Finance & Appropriations—Chair
- State Controlling Board

== Wayne County Commissioner ==
Amstutz currently serves as a Wayne County Commissioner since departing the Ohio House of Representatives. He was first elected in 2016.

== Electoral history ==
Ohio House of Representatives 1st District: 1998 to 2012
Year	Democrat	Votes	Pct	Republican	Votes	Pct
2012	John Maglio	16,626	34.11%	Ron Amstutz	32,110	65.89%
2010	Unopposed			Ron Amstutz	29,003	100.0%
2008	Merle Miller	17,199	34.93%	Ron Amstutz	32,034	65.07%
1998	Unopposed			Ron Amstutz	25,328	100.0%

Ohio Senate 22nd District: 2000 to 2004
Year	Democrat	Votes	Pct	Republican	Votes	Pct	Independent	Votes	Pct	Libertarian	Votes	Pct
2004	Unopposed			Ron Amstutz	116,588	100.0%						
2000	Elizabeth Kelley	55,951	35.50%	Ron Amstutz	91,542	58.10%	Randy Jotte	6,977	4.40%	Cheryl Neufer	3,014	1.90%

== Personal life ==
Representative Amstutz and his wife have two grown children and live in Wooster, Ohio.
