= Matthew Good Band discography =

This is the discography of the Matthew Good Band, a Canadian alternative rock band from Coquitlam, British Columbia.

== Demos ==
Year	Title
1994	15 Hours on a September Thursday

== Studio albums ==
Year	Title	Peak chart positions	Certifications
Year	Title	CAN	
1995	Last of the Ghetto Astronauts	-	MC: Gold
1997	Underdogs	50	MC: Platinum
1999	Beautiful Midnight	1	MC: 2× Platinum
2001	The Audio of Being	4	MC: Gold

== EPs ==
Released	Title	CAN
1997	Raygun	-
1998	Lo-Fi B-Sides	-
2001	Loser Anthems: B-sides and Rarities	6

== Compilations ==
Released	Title	CAN
1997	History Teacher (Bootleg)	
2005	In a Coma: 1995–2005 *	6

- Note: Contains material from the Matthew Good Band as well as Matthew Good's solo releases.

== Singles ==
Year	Title	Peak Chart Position			Album
Year	Title	CAN	CAN Rock/Alt.	US Mod	Album
1995	"Alabama Motel Room"	—	—	—	Last of the Ghetto Astronauts
1996	"Symbolistic White Walls"	62	—	—	Last of the Ghetto Astronauts
1997	"Haven't Slept in Years"	—	—	—	Raygun
1997	"Raygun"	7	—	—	Raygun
1997	"Everything Is Automatic"	32	11	—	Underdogs
1998	"Indestructible"	—	7	—	Underdogs
1998	"Apparitions"	59	6	—	Underdogs
1998	"Rico"	23	—	—	Underdogs
1999	"Hello Time Bomb"	26	3	34	Beautiful Midnight
1999	"Load Me Up"	—	1	—	Beautiful Midnight
2000	"Strange Days"	—	6	—	Beautiful Midnight
2000	"The Future Is X-Rated"	—	—	—	Beautiful Midnight
2001	"Flashdance II"	—	60	—	Loser Anthems
2001	"Carmelina"	40	—	—	The Audio of Being
2002	"Anti-Pop"	—	—	—	The Audio of Being

== Music videos ==
Year	Title	Director
1995	"Alabama Motel Room"	Samir Rehem
1996	"Symbolistic White Walls"	Samir Rehem
1997	"Everything Is Automatic"	William Morrison
1997	"Indestructible"	William Morrison
1998	"Apparitions"	William Morrison
1998	"Rico"	William Morrison
1999	"Hello Time Bomb"	William Morrison
1999	"Load Me Up"	William Morrison
2000	"Strange Days"	William Morrison & Matthew Good
2000	"The Future Is X-Rated"	William Morrison & Matthew Good
2001	"Carmelina"	William Morrison
2002	"Anti-Pop"	Chris Nelson

== See also ==
- Matthew Good discography
