= Matthew Good discography =

This is a comprehensive discography for the solo works of Matthew Good, a Canadian singer-songwriter.

== Demos ==
Year	Title
1991	Sleep (with the Rodchester Kings)
1991	...And in Closing (with the Rodchester Kings)
1992	Broken
1993	Left of Normal
1994	Euphony
1994	15 Hours on a September Thursday

== Albums ==
=== Studio albums ===
Title	Details	Peak chart positions		Certifications
Title	Details	CAN	US Heatseekers	CAN
Avalanche	Release date: March 4, 2003; Label: Universal Music Canada; Formats: CD, download	2	—	Gold
White Light Rock & Roll Review	Release date: June 15, 2004; Label: Universal Music Canada; Formats: CD, download	4	—	Gold
Hospital Music	Release date: July 31, 2007; Label: Universal Music Canada; Formats: CD, download	1	—	Gold
Vancouver	Release date: October 6, 2009; Label: Universal Music Canada; Formats: CD, download	2	—	Gold
Lights of Endangered Species	Release date: May 31, 2011; Label: Universal Music Canada; Formats: CD, download	5	—	
Arrows of Desire	Release date: September 24, 2013; Label: Frostbyte Media Inc; Formats: CD, download	6	46	
Chaotic Neutral	Release date: September 25, 2015; Label: Warner Music Canada; Formats: CD, download	12	—	
Something Like a Storm	Release date: October 20, 2017; Label: Warner Music Canada; Formats: CD, download, vinyl	14	—	
Moving Walls	Release date: February 21, 2020; Label: Warner Music Canada; Formats: CD, download, vinyl	49	—	
"—" denotes releases that did not chart

=== Compilations and live albums ===
Title	Details	Peak chart positions	Certifications
Title	Details	CAN	CAN
In a Coma: 1995–2005	Release date: September 20, 2005; Label: Universal Music Canada; Formats: CD, download	6	Gold
Live at Massey Hall	Release date: October 7, 2008; Label: Universal Music Canada; Formats: CD, download	24	
Old Fighters	Release date: March 12, 2013; Label: Frostbyte Media Inc; Formats: CD, download	—	
"—" denotes releases that did not chart

- Note: Contains material from the Matthew Good Band as well as Matthew Good's solo releases.

== Extended plays ==
Title	Details	Peak chart positions
Title	Details	CAN
I Miss New Wave: Beautiful Midnight Revisited	Release date: December 2, 2016; Label: M. Good Productions; Format: CD, Download, Vinyl	16
Zero Hours	Release date: October 3, 2025; Label: Darktown; Format: CD, Download, Vinyl	

== Singles ==
Year	Single	Peak chart positions			Album
Year	Single	CAN	CAN Alt.	CAN Rock	Album
2002	"Weapon"	—	—	4	Avalanche
2003	"In a World Called Catastrophe"	5	—	8	Avalanche
2003	"Near Fantastica"	—	—	—	Avalanche
2004	"Alert Status Red"	37	—	2	White Light Rock & Roll Review
2004	"It's Been a While Since I Was Your Man"	—	—	15	White Light Rock & Roll Review
2004	"In Love With a Bad Idea"	—	—	—	White Light Rock & Roll Review
2005	"Oh Be Joyful"	—	—	4	In A Coma
2007	"Born Losers"	27	—	2	Hospital Music
2007	"I'm a Window"	—	—	7	Hospital Music
2008	"The Devil's in Your Details"	—	—	—	Hospital Music
2008	"Black Helicopter (Live)"	—	—	—	Live at Massey Hall
2009	"Last Parade"	45	—	6	Vancouver
2009	"Us Remains Impossible"	—	—	26	Vancouver
2011	"In a Place of Lesser Men"	—	12	36	Lights of Endangered Species
2011	"Zero Orchestra"	—	8	22	Lights of Endangered Species
2013	"Had It Coming"	—	—	21	Arrows of Desire
2013	"Arrows of Desire"	—	—	31	Arrows of Desire
2015	"All You Sons And Daughters"	—	—	—	Chaotic Neutral
2016	"No Liars"	—	—	47	Chaotic Neutral
2017	"Decades"	—	—	37	Something Like a Storm
2019	"Sicily"	—	—	43	Moving Walls
2025	"Lost and Found Kids"	—	—	—	Zero Hours

== Music videos ==
Year	Title	Director
2002	"Weapon"	Matthew Good & Ante Kovac
2003	"In a World Called Catastrophe"	Kyle Davison
2004	"Alert Status Red"	Kyle Davison
2004	"It's Been a While Since I Was Your Man"	William Morrison
2013	"Had It Coming"	David Spearing
2015	"All You Sons And Daughters"	Andy Hines
2017	"Bad Guys Win"	Sean McLeod
2017	"Decades"	Elliott Montello & Stefan Berrill
2019	"Sicily"	Stefan Berrill

== See also ==
- Matthew Good Band discography
