= In a Coma =

2003 compilation album by Matthew Good

In a Coma: 1995–2005

Greatest hits album by Matthew Good
- Released: September 20, 2005
- Recorded: 1995–2005
- Genre: Rock
- Length: 72:12; 145:20 (deluxe)
- Label: Universal Music Canada
- Producers: John Shepp, Dale Penner, Warne Livesey, Matthew Good

Matthew Good chronology
White Light Rock & Roll Review (2004)	In a Coma: 1995–2005 (2005)	Hospital Music (2007)

Singles from In a Coma
- 1. "Oh Be Joyful" Released: 2005

Professional ratings
Review scores
Source	Rating
Allmusic	(Favorable)

In a Coma: 1995–2005 is the title of the Matthew Good compilation album, featuring both his solo work and work from the Matthew Good Band.

== Details ==
The album is often titled In a Coma: 1995–2005, and notably lacks either "best of" or "greatest hits" in the official title. It was released on September 20, 2005. However, even before its release, the album reached #1 on Amazon.ca via pre-orders, and 200 signed copies sold out from Matthew Good's official site in under four hours.

The album is available in two forms: the regular version and the deluxe. The regular only includes disc one, the deluxe features two audio discs and one DVD. The first disc contains nearly all of the singles released by the Matthew Good Band and Matt solo, lacking only Good's most recent singles ("Near Fantastica", "It's Been a While Since I Was Your Man", "In Love with a Bad Idea") and the singles from the album The Audio of Being ("Carmelina", "Anti-Pop"). The first disc also contains two new songs ("Oh Be Joyful", "Big City Life"), as well as a b-side ("Pony Boy") recorded during the sessions for The Audio of Being.

For the second disc, Good entered the studio solo with an acoustic guitar and recorded new versions of several songs from his extensive catalog. For added effect, Good miked the street outside the studio as he performed, adding an ambiance to the session that Good particularly enjoyed. Given the scarcity of the two MGB EPs Lo-Fi B-Sides and Loser Anthems, Good decided to add the two discs to the latter half of the second disc as a nod to fans.

The DVD in the deluxe package includes every promotional video filmed during Good's career, solo and with the Matthew Good Band. As a bonus, Good recorded a commentary track with Bill Morrison, who directed the majority of the videos. The DVD also includes an animated video for "While We Were Hunting Rabbits", which was created by students at Sheridan College. After Good realized that his favourite songs had not been included in the package, a section featuring those songs accompanied by a slideshow of images similar to the cover artwork was added to the disc.

"Oh Be Joyful", the first single from In a Coma, was released on July 25, 2005. The song's release was accompanied by a video that many fans found confusing, as it contained little more than a burning fireplace. Matthew Good was quick to defend his video on his blog, saying that it was "one of the greatest temporary musical screen savers of all time" and that it was only intended to appear on his site, not to play on Much Music.

== Track listing ==
=== Regular release ===
1. "Oh Be Joyful" – 3:52 (previously unreleased)
2. "Big City Life" – 4:15 (previously unreleased)
3. "Alert Status Red" – 4:19 (from White Light Rock & Roll Review)
4. "Weapon" – 6:06 (from Avalanche)
5. "In a World Called Catastrophe" – 5:59 (from Avalanche)
6. "Hello Time Bomb" – 3:56 (from Beautiful Midnight)
7. "Load Me Up" – 3:42 (from Beautiful Midnight)
8. "Strange Days" – 4:24 (from Beautiful Midnight)
9. "The Future Is X-Rated" – 3:46 (from Beautiful Midnight)
10. "Everything Is Automatic" – 4:18 (from Underdogs)
11. "Rico" – 3:27 (from Underdogs)
12. "Apparitions" – 5:14 (from Underdogs)
13. "Indestructible" – 3:26 (from Underdogs)
14. "Symbolistic White Walls" – 4:30 (from Last of the Ghetto Astronauts)
15. "Haven't Slept In Years (Alternate)" – 3:35 (from Raygun)
16. "Alabama Motel Room" – 3:20 (from Last of the Ghetto Astronauts)
17. "Pony Boy" – 4:03 (previously unreleased)
18. "All Together" – 4:37 (previously unreleased) iTunes Pre-Order Track / ca.7digital.com exclusive

=== Deluxe Edition ===
Part One: Rooms (acoustic reworkings)

1. "Truffle Pigs" – 4:04
2. "Tripoli" – 4:51
3. "Generation X-Wing" – 3:55
4. "Apparitions" – 4:05
5. "North American for Life" – 3:13
6. "Advertising on Police Cars" – 4:08
7. "Hello Time Bomb" – 4:10
8. "Strange Days" – 4:55
9. "Prime Time Deliverance" – 4:22

Part Two: Loser Anthems

10. "Flashdance II" – 4:44
11. "The Man from Harold Wood" – 2:18
12. "My Life as a Circus Clown" – 2:46
13. "Intermezzo: M. Good v. M. Trolley" – 0:35
14. "Flight Recorder from Viking 7" – 5:34
15. "Life Beyond the Minimum Safe Distance" – 3:53
16. "The Fine Art of Falling Apart" – 3:39

Part Three: Lo-Fi B-Sides

17. "Born to Kill" – 5:14
18. "Enjoy the Silence" – 3:11
19. "Fated" – 3:31

==== Bonus DVD ====
Part One: Music Videos

1. Alabama Motel Room
2. Symbolistic White Walls
3. Everything Is Automatic
4. Indestructible
5. Apparitions
6. Rico
7. Hello Time Bomb
8. Load Me Up
9. Strange Days
10. The Future Is X-Rated
11. Carmelina
12. Anti-Pop
13. Weapon
14. In a World Called Catastrophe
15. Alert Status Red
16. It's Been a While Since I Was Your Man
17. While We Were Hunting Rabbits (new video)

Part Two: The Making of "Rooms"

1. The Making of "Rooms" Feature

Part Three: Matthew's picks with special slide show

1. Avalanche
2. A Long Way Down
3. Pledge of Allegiance
4. Blue Skies Over Bad Lands
5. House of Smoke and Mirrors

Part Four: Discography

== Personnel ==
Matthew Good Band performs from Last of the Ghetto Astronauts to Loser Anthems. Others are performed by Matthew Good.

- Matthew Good Band
  - Matthew Good – vocals, guitar, cover concept (Underdogs), piano, percussion, additional producer, strings, writing & arrangement, art director, producer
  - Ian Browne – drums
  - Geoff Lloyd – Bass guitar (Last of the Ghetto Astronauts, Raygun, Underdogs)
  - Rich Priske – Bass guitar
  - Dave Genn – Guitar, Keyboards

=== Last of the Ghetto Astronauts ===
- Dave Genn – Organ, Rhodes (not part of MGB at this time)
- John Shepp – Producer, mixer
- Terry Brown – Mixer ("Alabama Motel Room", "Symbolistic White Walls")
- George Leger – Mastering
- Recorded at Utopia Parkway Studios, Vancouver, British Columbia, Canada
- Manufacturer: Darktown Records
- Distributor: A&M Records, a division of PolyGram Inc.
- Words and music by Matthew Good

Except "Alabama Motel Room", music by Good/Lloyd/Browne

=== Raygun ===
- Dale Penner – Producer, engineer
- Clif Norrell – Mixer
- Stephen Marcussen – Mastering
- Recorded at Greenhouse Studios, Burnaby, British Columbia, Canada
- Words and music by Matthew Good

=== Underdogs ===
Todd Kerns performs backing vocals on "Everything Is Automatic" and "Rico" (not part of MGB)

- Warne Livesey – Producer, engineer, mixer
- Dean Maher – Assistant
- Zach Blackstone – Engineer
- Stephen Marcussen – Mastering
- Recorded at Greenhouse Studios, Burnaby, British Columbia, Canada
- Words by Matthew Good
- Music by Matthew Good/Dave Genn

Except "Rico", music by Good/Browne/Lloyd/Genn

=== Lo-Fi B-Sides (Disc Two, Part Three) ===
- Warne Livesey – Producer, engineer, mixer

=== Beautiful Midnight ===
Todd Kerns (not part of MGB) performs backing vocals on "Hello Time Bomb"

- Natasha Duprey – Phone Sex on "The Future is X-Rated"
- Warne Livesey – Producer, Engineer, mixer
- Zach Blackstone – Engineer
- Steve Kaplan (BJG Studios, London) – Mixer
- Tim Young – Mastering
- Recorded at House of Brucifer, Vancouver, British Columbia, Canada
- Words by Matthew Good
- Music by Matthew Good/Dave Genn

Except "Load Me Up", music by Good/Genn/Browne/Priske

=== Loser Anthems (Disc Two, Part Two) ===
Holly McNarland performs backing vocals on "Flight Recorder from Viking 7" (not part of MGB)

=== Avalanche ===
- Pat Steward – Drums, Percussion
- Richard Priske – Bass guitar, Additional Keyboards, Additional producer
- Christian Thor Valdson – Electric Guitar
- Vancouver Symphony Orchestra – Strings
- Musica Intima – Choral Performances
- Warne Livesey – Producer, engineer, mixer, strings Writing & Arrangement
- Zach Blackstone – Engineer
- Adam Ayan (Gateway Mastering) – Mastering
- Recorded at Mushroom Studios, Vancouver, British Columbia, Canada
- All songs by Matthew Good

=== White Light Rock & Roll Review ===
- Pat Steward – Drums
- Rich Priske – Bass guitar
- Christian Thor Valdson – Electric Guitar
- Warne Livesey – Producer, engineer, mixer
- Scott Ternan – Assistant engineer
- Joel Livesey – Assistant engineer
- Zach Blackstone – Assistant engineer
- Kirk McNally – Assistant engineer
- Mastered by Tim Young at Metropolis, London, UK
- Tim Young (Metropolis, London, England) – Mastering
- Recorded at Mushroom Studios and Warehouse Studios, Vancouver, British Columbia, Canada
- All songs by Matthew Good

=== New Songs ("Oh Be Joyful", "Big City Life") ===
- Ryan Dahle – Lead guitar, engineer
- Pat Steward – Drums
- Megan Bradfield – Bass guitar
- Zach Blackstone – Engineer
- Randy Staub – Mixer
- George Marino – Mastering
- Recorded at Warehouse Studios, Vancouver, British Columbia, Canada
- All songs by Matthew Good

=== B-Sides ("Pony Boy") (unreleased from "The Audio of Being" sessions) ===
- Matthew Good – Electric Guitar, vocals
- Dave Genn – Electric Guitar, Keyboards
- Rich Priske – Bass guitar
- Ian Browne – Drums
- Holly McNarland – Backing vocals
- Warne Livesey – Producer, engineer, mixer
- Recorded at Armoury Studios and Warehouse Studios, Vancouver, British Columbia, Canada
- Words & Music by Matthew Good

=== Rooms ===
- Recorded at Warehouse Studios, Vancouver, British Columbia, Canada
- All songs by Matthew Good

=== Music videos ===
Videos features music, words, and band members from the album they were released on, information on those can be found on each album's page.

- All videos directed by Bill Morrison

Except "Strange Days" (Morrison/Good), "Anti-Pop" (Chris Nelson), "Weapon" (officially Ante Kovac/Good, but Good fired Kovac halfway through the video), "In a World Called Catastrophe" (Kyle Davison), and "While We Were Hunting Rabbits (animation students of Sheridan College)

Note: Because most of this album is a compilation, the personnel varies from song to song, which is why the albums were listed during Disc One. The information here is condensed; full information can be retrieved on the album's original page.
