= Live at Massey Hall (Matthew Good album) =

2008 live album by Matthew Good

Live At Massey Hall

Live album by Matthew Good
- Released: October 7, 2008 (iTunes), November 4, 2008 (physical)
- Recorded: May 2008
- Genre: Rock
- Length: 1:53.04
- Label: Universal Music Canada
- Producer: Matthew Good

Matthew Good chronology
Hospital Music (2007)	Live At Massey Hall (2008)	Vancouver (2009)

Singles from Live at Massey Hall
- 1. "Black Helicopter (Live)" Released: October 2008

Professional ratings
Review scores
Source	Rating
ChartAttack	3/5 stars

Live At Massey Hall is a live album by Canadian musician Matthew Good. It was recorded at Massey Hall in Toronto on May 29, 2008, during his Full Band Tour.

== Release ==
The first 12 of the album's 20 tracks were made available for purchase on iTunes Canada on October 7, 2008. At the time, domestic pre-sale orders for 300 limited-edition signed copies of the double CD were accepted on Good's online store. On November 4, the remainder of the 10,000 CDs will also be available for purchase at Canadian retail stores.

Internationally, all twenty tracks were made available for purchase on iTunes on October 7. At that time, international pre-sale orders for 300 limited-edition signed copies of the double CD were also accepted on Good's online store.

While Good initially planned to release a limited-edition version on vinyl, he later noted on his blog that the length of the album made such an effort cost-prohibitive.

== Track listing ==
Side 01

1. "Champions Of Nothing" - 9:22
2. "A Single Explosion" - 3:33
3. "Odette" - 4:50
4. "Weapon" - 6:43
5. "The Devil’s In Your Details" - 3:56
6. "Hello Time Bomb" - 5:34
7. "Born Losers" - 5:15
8. "Load Me Up" - 4:15
9. "Put Out Your Lights" - 2:24
10. "Blue Skies Over Bad Lands" - 8:56
11. "Black Helicopter" - 7:04
12. "I’m A Window" - 4:09

Side 02

1. "99% Of Us Is Failure" - 7:11
2. "Apparitions" - 5:52
3. "Giant" - 6:10
4. "Avalanche" - 10:09
5. "She’s In It For The Money" - 5:18
6. "Everything Is Automatic" - 5:08
7. "Strange Days (Acoustic)" - 4:13
8. "True Love Will Find You In The End (Acoustic)" - 3:13
