= Juno Awards of 1999 =

Canadian music awards ceremony

- Date: 7 March 1999
- Venue: Copps Coliseum, Hamilton, Ontario
- Hosted by: Mike Bullard

Television/radio coverage
- Network: CBC

The Juno Awards of 1999 honouring Canadian music industry achievements were held in Hamilton, Ontario, Canada. The primary ceremonies at Copps Coliseum on 7 March 1999 were broadcast by CBC Television and hosted by Mike Bullard.

Nominations were announced 27 January 1999 from the Glenn Gould Studio in Toronto.

CBC technicians under the Communications, Energy and Paperworkers Union of Canada were on strike in early 1999. However, the union chose not to picket the Juno Awards broadcast.

Luc Plamondon was inducted into the Canadian Music Hall of Fame.

== Nominees and winners ==
=== Best Female Vocalist ===
Winner: Celine Dion

Other Nominees:

- Holly Cole
- Deborah Cox
- Lynda Lemay
- Ginette Reno

=== Best Male Vocalist ===
Winner: Jim Cuddy

Other Nominees:

- Corey Hart
- Colin James
- Kevin Parent
- David Usher

=== Best New Solo Artist ===
Winner: Melanie Doane

Other Nominees:

- Emm Gryner
- Bruce Guthro
- Hayden
- Tamia

=== Best Group ===
Winner: Barenaked Ladies

Other Nominees:

- Matthew Good Band
- Philosopher Kings
- The Rankins
- The Tragically Hip

=== Best New Group ===
Winner: Johnny Favourite Swing Orchestra

Other Nominees:

- Love Inc.
- The Moffatts
- New Meanies
- The Wilkinsons

=== Best Songwriter ===
Winner: Bryan Adams, "On a Day Like Today" with Phil Thornalley, "When You're Gone" with Eliot Kennedy

Other Nominees:

- Loreena McKennitt, "The Mummer's Dance"
- Ed Robertson, "One Week"
- Amy Sky, "Love Pain and the Whole Damn Thing" and "Heaven" (both with Steven MacKinnon), "Ordinary Miracles" with David Pickell
- Shania Twain, "Don't Be Stupid (You Know I Love You)", "From This Moment On", "You're Still the One" (all with Robert John "Mutt" Lange)

=== Best Country Female Vocalist ===
Winner: Shania Twain

Other Nominees:

- Lisa Brokop
- Tracey Brown
- Terri Clark
- Beverley Mahood

=== Best Country Male Vocalist ===
Winner: Paul Brandt

Other Nominees:

- Chris Cummings
- Jason McCoy
- Duane Steele
- Jamie Warren

=== Best Country Group or Duo ===
Winner: Leahy

Other Nominees:

- Farmer's Daughter
- Prairie Oyster
- Thomas Wade and Wayward
- The Wilkinsons

=== International Achievement Award ===
Winner: Celine Dion

=== Best Producer ===
Winner: Colin James "Let's Shout" (with co-producer Joe Hardy) and "C'mon With The C'mon"

Other Nominees:

- Bryan Adams (with Bob Rock), "C'mon, C'mon, C'mon", "How Do Ya Feel Tonight" both by Bryan Adams
- Bruce Fairbairn, "Within" and "I Finally Found My Way" by Kiss
- David Foster, "I Never Loved You Anyway" by The Corrs and "Have You Ever?" by Brandy
- Daniel Lanois, "The Maker" by Willie Nelson

=== Best Recording Engineer ===
Winner: Kevin Doyle, "Stanstill" by various artists and "Soul On Soul" by Amy Sky

Other Nominees:

- Lenny DeRose, "Hurts to Love You" and "You Stepped on My Life" by Philosopher Kings
- Ormond Jobin, "Desperately" and "If We Had Never Met" by Shirley Eikhard
- Randy Staub, "C'mon, C'mon, C'mon" by Bryan Adams and "Radio" by Copyright
- John Whynot, "Disappointment" and "All in Time" by Jim Cuddy

=== Canadian Music Hall of Fame ===
Winner: Luc Plamondon

=== Walt Grealis Special Achievement Award ===
Winner: Allan Waters

== Nominated and winning albums ==
=== Best Album ===
Winner: Let's Talk About Love, Celine Dion

Other Nominees:

- The Book of Secrets, Loreena McKennitt
- Grand parleur petit faiseur, Kevin Parent
- Happy?, Jann Arden
- Phantom Power, The Tragically Hip

=== Best Alternative Album ===
Winner: Rufus Wainwright, Rufus Wainwright

Other Nominees:

- Breath from Another, Esthero
- Bring Yourself Up, Bodega
- BTK, BTK
- The Closer I Get, Hayden

=== Best Blues Album ===
Winner: Blues Weather, Fathead

Other Nominees:

- Big Boy, Carlos del Junco
- Blues Boss Boogie, Kenny "Blues Boss" Wayne
- Blues Money, Michael Pickett
- Colin James and the Little Big Band II, Colin James

=== Best Children's Album ===
Winner: Mozart's Magnificent Voyage, Susan Hammond's Classical Kids

Other Nominees:

- Accordelidon, Danielle Martineau
- Celebrate the Music, Sandra Beech
- If Fish Could Sing, Teresa Doyle
- Musical Mystery Machines, Ken Whiteley

=== Best Classical Album (Solo or Chamber Ensemble) ===
Winner: Bach: Well-Tempered Clavier - Book 1, Angela Hewitt

Other Nominees:

- Dvorak, Mendelssohn: Piano Trios, The Gryphon Trio
- In Brahms' Apartment, Amici Ensemble
- Medtner: The Complete Piano Sonatas, Marc-André Hamelin
- Telemann: Tafelmusik, Ensemble Arion

=== Best Classical Album (Large Ensemble) ===
Winner: Handel: Music For The Royal Fireworks, Tafelmusik, Jeanne Lamon (musical director)

Other Nominees:

- Bartok: Dance Suite, Music for Strings, Toronto Symphony Orchestra
- Reverie et Caprice: Violin Romances, Chantal Juillet, Montreal Symphony Orchestra
- Saint-Saëens - Fauré - Roussel, Stéphane Lemelin, CBC Vancouver Orchestra
- Schnittke, Part, Gorecki, I Musici de Montreal

=== Best Classical Album (Vocal or Choral Performance) ===
Winner: Songs of Travel, Gerald Finley (baritone) and Stephen Ralls (piano)

Other Nominees:

- A Britten Serenade, Manitoba Chamber Orchestra, Henriette Schellenberg (soprano), Benjamin Butterfield (tenor), James Sommerville (horn)
- Messiah: The Complete Choruses, Tafelmusik Chamber Choir and Orchestra
- Musica Intima, Musica Intima
- Vivaldi: Motets for Soprano, Karina Gauvin (soprano)

=== Best Album Design ===
Winner: Andrew McLachlan, Rob Baker, Brock Ostrom, Bernard Clark, David Ajax, Phantom Power by The Tragically Hip

Other Nominees:

- David Ashcroft, Ivan Otis, Margaret Malandruccolo, Three Seeds by New Meanies
- Steve Goode, David Anthony, Since When by 54-40
- John Rummen, Jay Blakesburg, Stunt by Barenaked Ladies
- Hugh Syme, Geddy Lee, Andrew MacNaughton, Different Stages by Rush

=== Best Gospel Album ===
Winner: Life Is, Sharon Riley and Faith Chorale

Other Nominees:

- Follow Him, Toronto Mass Choir
- Listen to the Sound, Lianna Klassen
- Our Message, Selections
- To Whom It May Concern, Expression of Praise

=== Best Selling Francophone Album ===
Winner: S'il suffisait d'aimer, Celine Dion

Other Nominees:

- L'Album du peuple, volume 1, François Perusse
- Enchantée, Carmen Campagne
- Grand parleur petit faiseur, Kevin Parent
- Lynda Lemay, Lynda Lemay

=== Best Instrumental Album ===
Winner: My Roots Are Showing, Natalie MacMaster

Other Nominees:

- Celtic Awakening, Howard Baer, Dan Gibson
- Celtic Dance, Casadh An tSúgáin (composers Oliver Schroer, John Herberman)
- Vertigo, Jesse Cook
- Whispering Woods, David Bradstreet, Dan Gibson

=== Best Selling Album (Foreign or Domestic) ===
Winner: Let's Talk About Love, Céline Dion

Other Nominees:

- Come On Over, Shania Twain
- Ray of Light, Madonna
- Spiceworld, Spice Girls
- Titanic, Music from the Motion Picture, James Horner

=== Best Mainstream Jazz Album ===
Winner: The Atlantic Sessions, Kirk MacDonald

Other Nominees:

- Cactus, François Bourassa
- Inner Urge, Dave Young Trio
- Kenny and Sonny Live at the Montreal Bistro, The Kenny Wheeler, Sonny Greenwich Quintet
- Siren's Song, Kenny Wheeler, Norma Winstone, John Taylor and the Maritime Jazz Orchestra

=== Best Contemporary Jazz Album ===
Winner: Metalwood 2, Metalwood

Other Nominees:

- Cruel Yet Fair, Hard Rubber Orchestra
- In the Vernacular: The Music of John Carter, François Houle
- Road Stories, Phil Dwyer
- You Are Here, Neufeld-Occhipinti Jazz Orchestra

=== Best Roots or Traditional Album - Group ===
Winner: The McGarrigle Hour, Kate & Anna McGarrigle

Other Nominees:

- Heartbreak Hill, Heartbreak Hill
- Matapat, Bourque, Bernard et Lepage
- Return of the Wanderer, Puirt a Baroque
- Strang, Zubot & Dawson

=== Best Roots or Traditional Album - Solo ===
Winner: Heartstrings, Willie P. Bennett

Other Nominees:

- Crazy Old Man, Roy Forbes
- My Roots Are Showing, Natalie MacMaster
- Sally's Dream, Bill Bourne
- Stones, Gordie Sampson

=== Best Pop Album ===
Winner: Stunt, Barenaked Ladies

Other Nominees:

- Chapter 1: A New Beginning, The Moffatts
- Famous, Rich and Beautiful, Philosopher Kings
- Grand parleur petit faiseur, Kevin Parent
- Happy?, Jann Arden
- Let's Talk About Love, Celine Dion

=== Best Rock Album ===
Winner: Phantom Power, The Tragically Hip

Other Nominees:

- Navy Blues, Sloan
- Silent Radar, The Watchmen
- Since When, 54-40
- Underdogs, Matthew Good Band

== Nominated and winning releases ==
=== Best Single ===
Winner: "One Week", Barenaked Ladies

Other Nominees:

- "Adia", Sarah McLachlan
- "Apparitions", Matthew Good Band
- "Hurts To Love You", Philosopher Kings
- "My Heart Will Go On", Celine Dion

=== Best Classical Composition ===
Winner: "Concerto For Wind Orchestra", Colin McPhee

Other Nominees:

- "Sonata for Viola and Piano". Chris Harman
- "Songs for an Acrobat". Linda Bouchard
- "Tre Vie". Malcolm Forsyth
- "Wine of Peace: Two Songs for Soprano and Orchestra". John Weinzweig

=== Best Rap Recording ===
Winner: Northern Touch by Rascalz featuring Choclair, Kardinal Offishall, Thrust, and Checkmate

Other Nominees:

- Built to Last, Maestro
- The Epic, Citizen Kane
- Frankenstein UV, Frankenstein
- Ghetto Concept, The Album, Ghetto Concept

=== Best R&B/Soul Recording ===
Winner: One Wish by Deborah Cox

Other Nominees:

- Bout Your Love, Glenn Lewis
- I Need Some Time, Kirsten Farkollie
- Rally'n, Jully Black featuring Saukrates
- Tamia, Tamia

=== Best Music of Aboriginal Canada Recording ===
Winner: Contact from the Underworld of Redboy, Robbie Robertson

Other Nominees:

- Hearts of the Nations, The 1997 Aboriginal Women's Voices Group
- Message from a Drum, J. Hubert Francis and Eagle Feather
- Thirst, Jani Lauzon
- Welcome to the Playground, TKO

=== Best Reggae/Calypso Recording ===
Winner: Vision, Frankie Wilmot

Other Nominees:

- Chains and Shackles, Inspector Lenny
- Glorious Ride, Lazah Current
- The Original, DJ Ray
- The Way I Feel, Mystics

=== Best Global Album ===
Winner: The Message, Alpha Yaya Diallo

Other Nominees:

- Endless, Silk Road Music
- Karsilama, Karsilama
- Por El Sol, Diego Marulanda & Pacande
- Vertigo, Jesse Cook

=== Best Dance Recording ===
Winner: Broken Bones, Love Inc.

Other Nominees:

- Hands of Time, Temperance
- I Got What It Takes, Jacynthe
- Popcorn, The Boomtang Boys
- Try My Love, Shauna Davis

=== Best Video ===
Winner: Javier Aguilera, "Forestfire" by David Usher

Other Nominees:

- Ulf Buddensieck, "Lukey" by Great Big Sea and The Chieftains
- Bill Morrison, "Apparitions" by Matthew Good Band
- Floria Sigismondi, "Sweet Surrender" by Sarah McLachlan
- Jeth Weinrich, "Wishing That" by Jann Arden
