= William Morrison (director) =

- Born: Canada
- Occupations: Musician, director, producer, engineer
- Instruments: Bass guitar, guitar, programming, vocals

William Morrison is a Canadian born Grammy and Juno Award-nominated music video director, documentary film director, and musician. He has directed music videos for popular rock bands Matthew Good and Fear Factory, and popular electronic music acts Skinny Puppy, Delerium, and Front Line Assembly.

== Director ==
Morrison's video directing career started in the early 1990s creating music videos for independent bands in the Vancouver, British Columbia, Canada area. It was here where Morrison developed his long musical relationship with the band Skinny Puppy, first directing the music video for the song "Killing Game" and then producing background film and video for their live performances.

During the mid-1990s Morrison founded Process Media Labs, a multimedia company inspired by his involvement with The Process, an internet art collective associated with the Skinny Puppy album release The Process. He later founded a company in Vancouver by a similar name, called Process Productions, with a continued focus on music video production. He was also employed in 2004 by YYZ Pictures, a Toronto-based production company.

Morrison's frequent music video work for Matthew Good resulted in a Video Director of the Year award at the 2002 West Coast Music Awards, and many best music video nominations over the years at both the Juno Awards and MuchMusic Video Awards.

== Musician ==
Morrison has collaborated with musician Justin Bennett on a multimedia project titled American Memory Project. The band combines original music and visual effects with public domain material available from the United States archive project of the same name, American Memory. The band toured during 2008 in support of the band ohGr.

Morrison played live guitar while on tour in the band ohGr from 2001 until 2008, and collaborated with bandmate Tim Skold to create the visuals projected during the 2001 concerts. Morrison also played live bass and guitar for Skinny Puppy during the band's tours in 2004 and 2005, again producing CGI visuals used during the concerts.

Morrison was a member of the band Sixtynine (69), which released two songs ("NAKED" and "We Love You") on Mp3.com and one music video online.

== Filmography ==
=== Music Videos ===
- Adrienne Pierce "Arizona" (2003)
- Ashrr "Medicine Man" (2018)
- Ashrr "Made Up Your Mind" (2019)
- Bif Naked "Daddy's Getting Married" (1996)
- Christa Couture "Scared, Too" (2007)
- The Dirtmitts "Get On" (2003)
- Delerium
  - "Flowers Become Screens" (1994)
  - "Incantation" (1994)
  - "Euphoria (Firefly)" (1997)
  - "Duende" (1998)
- Download "Glassblower" (1996)
- Facepuller
  - "Firebomb" (1992)
  - "Snakes In The Grass" (1992)
  - "Bored With Beauty" (1997)
- Fear Factory
  - "Cars" (1999)
  - "Resurrection" (1999)
- Free Agents (featuring DJ Kemo) "Breakdown" (2002)
- Front Line Assembly
  - "The Blade" (1992)
  - "Laughing Pain" (1992)
  - "Epitaph" (2001)
- Goat "Great Life" (1998)
- Gwar
  - "Phallus in Wonderland" (1992) - credited as "Distortion Wells"
  - "Saddam A Go-Go" (1994)
- Kim Stockwood "12 Years Old" (1999)
- Male or Female "Primitive Reflections Twisted from Sound" (visual artist, 2004)
- Matthew Good Band
  - "Everything Is Automatic" (1997)
  - "Indestructible" (1997)
  - "Apparitions" (1998)
  - "Rico" (1998)
  - "The Future is X-rated" (2000)
  - "Hello Time Bomb" (2000)
  - "Load Me Up" (2000)
  - "Strange Days" (2000)
  - "Carmelina" (2001)
  - "It's Been a While Since I Was Your Man" (2004)
- Odds
  - "King of the Heap" (1991)
  - "Wendy Under the Stars" (1991)
  - "It Falls Apart" (1993)
- ohGr
  - "Cracker" (2001)
  - Welt tour backing video (2001)
  - "Majik" (2003)
  - "Minus" (2003)
- Pepper Sands
  - "So Fine" (2000)
  - "Win Big, Lose More" (2002)
- Skinny Puppy
  - Too Dark Park tour backing film (1990)
  - "Killing Game" (1992)
  - Last Rights tour backing film (1992)
  - "Curcible" (1996)
  - "Hardset Head" (1996)
  - "Pro-Test" (2004)
  - The Greater Wrong of the Right tour backing video (2004, 2005)
  - The Greater Wrong of the Right Live DVD (2005)
- SNFU "Fate"
- The Tear Garden "Shiela Liked the Rodeo" (1992)

=== Documentaries ===
- FIFA World Cup 2002 (2003)
- Information Warfare (2005)
- Hail Satan? (2019)

=== Misc ===
- "Poetry & Apocalypse", Holy Body Tattoo Dance Company (1997)
- "Namaste", a television pilot (2003)
- "Glutton for Punishment", a television series on the Food Network (2006–present)
- "American Memory Project" (2006–present)
- "Need for Speed III: Hot Pursuit" - Intro sequence (1998)
