= Raygun (song) =

Single by Matthew Good Band

from the album Raygun
- Released: 1997
- Genre: Alternative rock
- Length: 3:17
- Label: Independent, A&M Records
- Songwriter: Matthew Good
- Producer: Dale Penner

Matthew Good Band singles chronology
"Haven't Slept in Years" (1997)	"Raygun" (1997)	"Everything Is Automatic" (1997)

"Raygun" is a song by Matthew Good Band. It was released as the second single from their 1997 EP of the same name and peaked at #7 on Canada's Singles Chart in 2001.

== Charts ==
Chart (2001)	Peak position
Canada (Nielsen SoundScan)	7
