= Load Me Up =

Single by Matthew Good Band

Single by Matthew Good Band

from the album Beautiful Midnight
- Released: December 1999
- Recorded: 1999
- Genre: Alternative rock
- Length: 3:40
- Label: Universal Music Canada (Canada); Atlantic Records (US)
- Songwriters: Matthew Good, Ian Browne, Dave Genn, Rich Priske
- Producer: Warne Livesey

Matthew Good Band singles chronology
| "Hello Time Bomb" (1999) | "Load Me Up" (1999) | "Strange Days" (2000) |

"Load Me Up" is a song by Canadian rock group Matthew Good Band. The song was released as the second single from the band's third studio album, Beautiful Midnight. The song reached No. 1 on Canada's Rock chart, and continues to be one of the band's most popular songs. The song is featured on the MuchMusic compilation album; Big Shiny Tunes 5. The song was ranked No. 1 by Vice on their “Completely Biased Ranking of the 60 Best CanRock Songs Ever” list. In 2016, Good released a re-recorded version of the song on his EP, I Miss New Wave: Beautiful Midnight Revisited. Between 1995 and 2016, "Load Me Up" was the ninth most played song by a Canadian artist on rock radio stations in Canada.

== Music video ==
The music video features a dream sequence of all four band members being chased by several school uniformed students. The band runs up the stairs to the roof of a building and jump off the roof into a body of water, to which all the students follow. As they continue to run away in the water, everyone of the band members are tackled into the water one by one by the students. As Good is tackled, the video then cuts to Good sliding into a rain-soaked soccer field. As he gets up, he sees the students at the other side of the field taunting him. One student (the same one who tackled him) spits towards Good from the top of the group. Good glances over his left shoulder at an unseen figure, and then runs towards them and jumps into the group of students and is quickly finished off, and is seen lying on the ground with closed eyes.

Good then wakes up in his bedroom and sees the girl who tackled him and spat at him in his dream staring at him. The camera then moves behind the girl, revealing her holding a large kitchen knife behind her back as the video cuts to black.

=== Filming ===
The music video was directed by Bill Morrison and produced by Paddy Gillen. The video was filmed over a three-day period in many popular locations in Vancouver, such as the Pacific Coliseum, the Pacific National Exhibition and the Vancouver Aquatic Centre. The video had the highest budget of any MGB music video, costing an estimated $150,000.

=== Awards and nominations ===
- The video reached No. 1 on MuchMusic Countdown for two consecutive weeks between March 10 and 17, 2000.
- The video was nominated for five awards at the 2000 Much Music Video Awards, winning for Best Video and Best Rock Video.
- The video was nominated for "Best Video" at the 2001 Juno Awards.

== Charts ==
| Chart (2000) | Peak position |
|---|---|
| Canada Top 30 Rock Report (RPM) | 1 |
