= Rich Priske =

Canadian musician (1967–2020)

Background information
- Also known as: Rich Rock
- Born: August 28, 1967
- Origin: Vancouver, British Columbia, Canada
- Died: July 11, 2020 (aged 52)
- Instruments: Bass guitar, keyboards

Rich Priske (August 29, 1967 – July 11, 2020), also known as Rich Rock, was a Canadian bass guitarist. Born in Vancouver, British Columbia, he had long been active in the B.C. music scene, and played bass guitar and/or written songs for Art Bergmann, DSK, ShoCore, Chrome Dog, Bif Naked, The Real McKenzies, and others. Priske was best known for playing bass guitar in the Canadian band Matthew Good Band from 1998 to 2002. After the band's dissolution in 2002, he kept playing with Matthew Good until the end of the In a Coma tour in fall 2005. Later in life, he lived in Kelowna and played in the Jon Bos Band and Florida Man. Before his death on July 11, 2020, Priske had a family with Glenda (Crawford) Fiancé, And Trey (Carson) Stepson.

== Writing ==
Priske was an avid writer, contributing to weblogs as a "citizen journalist" for kitsilano.ca, and others. He contributed many technical and instructional articles to magazines such as CM (Canadian Musician). Priske also wrote for Wine Trails, and other wine-industry publications. He had a long history with the web, and was an early adopter of what is now known as "web logging" or "blogging", beginning with his popular "Notes From The Road" feature on the now defunct Matthew Good Band website, circa 2001. He kept a blog on Blogger, but updated it rarely.

== Film work ==
Priske was also involved in British Columbia's thriving film and theatre industry, on stage and both in front of and behind the camera. As well as appearing in many music videos, he had bit parts in films like Red Scorpion 2, and Hard Core Logo, and appeared on stage in productions of Cabaret and You Can't Take It with You. Behind the scenes, Priske was active in the Art Department, earning an Emmy nomination for 2008's Tinman.

== Death ==
On July 11, 2020, Priske died of a heart attack.

== Discography ==
with Matthew Good Band:

- Beautiful Midnight
- Loser Anthems
- The Audio of Being

with Matthew Good:

- Avalanche
- White Light Rock & Roll Review
- In a Coma

with DSK:

- Exploder
- Imploder

with Bif Naked:

- Bif Naked
- Essentially Naked (greatest hits compilation)

with The Real McKenzies:

- Real McKenzies
- Clash of the Tartans

with ShoCore:

- untitled release (2007)

with Brooke Nolan:

- self-titled EP

with The Town Pants:

- Weight of Words

Sex With Nixon (1995) Self titled LP
