= Avalanche (Matthew Good album) =

2003 studio album by Matthew Good

Studio album by Matthew Good
- Released: March 4, 2003
- Recorded: Mushroom Studios, Vancouver, British Columbia, Canada except track 2 at Warehouse Studios, Vancouver, British Columbia, Canada
- Genre: Alternative rock
- Length: 69:07
- Label: Darktown, Universal Music Canada
- Producer: Warne Livesey

Matthew Good chronology
The Audio of Being (2001)	Avalanche (2003)	White Light Rock & Roll Review (2004)

Singles from Avalanche
- 1. "Weapon" Released: October 2002; 2. "In A World Called Catastrophe" Released: February 2003; 3. "Near Fantastica" Released: June 2003

Professional ratings
Review scores
Source	Rating
Sputnikmusic	4.5/5 stars

Avalanche is the debut solo album by Canadian singer-songwriter Matthew Good. Released in 2003, the album marked a creative departure from his earlier work with the Matthew Good Band, and featured accompaniment by the Vancouver Symphony Orchestra on several tracks. The album had three singles: "Weapon", "In a World Called Catastrophe" and "Near Fantastica", although "Near Fantastica" was released only to radio in a substantially shorter edit.

== Reception and commercial performance ==
The album received high praise from both music critics and fans of Good alike. The album debuted at No. 2 on the Canadian Albums Chart, selling 16,800 copies in its first week. The album was certified Gold on May 8, 2003.

== Awards & Nominations ==
Producer Warne Livesey, who previously worked with Good on the massively successful Beautiful Midnight, received a Juno Award nomination for his work on the album. Avalanche was nominated for "Favourite New Album" at the 2003 CASBY Awards.

== Track listing ==
No.	Title	Length
1.	"Pledge of Allegiance"	4:59
2.	"Lullaby for the New World Order"	3:52
3.	"Weapon"	5:58
4.	"In a World Called Catastrophe"	5:57
5.	"Avalanche"	7:26
6.	"21st Century Living"	3:10
7.	"While We Were Hunting Rabbits"	8:00
8.	"Bright End of Nowhere"	4:08
9.	"Near Fantastica"	8:00
10.	"Song for the Girl"	3:16
11.	"Double Life"	4:22
12.	"A Long Way Down"	3:56
13.	"House of Smoke & Mirrors"	6:03

== Composition ==
- "Near Fantastica" is perhaps the oldest song from Avalanche. Written in 1996, "Near Fantastica" was originally stated by Good to have been musically similar to "Suburbia" (from Beautiful Midnight) and vocally similar to "Every Name Is My Name" (from Last of the Ghetto Astronauts) On Avalanche the lyrics were altered slightly from those Good posted online in 1999. The music, too, was changed to incorporate aspects of another song "Villain of the Year", which Good had become disenchanted with during the recording of Avalanche. The original version, which is a mere 4:23, was dubbed the 'radio edit' of the song and released as the record's third single. The 8-minute version on the album was altered from the original version during the mixing of Avalanche as he preferred it to the "simple verse, chorus, structure of the original."
- "A Long Way Down" was one of the last songs written for Avalanche. The song is based around a drum track that was taken from another song, "Comfortable Criminals", which was later cut from the album and released as a b-side.

== Personnel ==
- Matthew Good – vocals, guitar, art direction
- Christian Thor Valdson – guitar
- Pat Steward – drums, percussion
- Rich Priske – bass guitar
