= Last Parade =

Last Parade may refer to:

- "Last Parade" (song), a 2009 song by Matthew Good
- Last Parade (album), an album by Call Me No One
- The Last Parade (film), 1931 American crime film
