= Euphony (disambiguation) =

Euphony is the demonstration of pleasant phonaesthetics.

Euphony may also refer to:

- Euphony (Casiopea album) (1988)
- Euphony (Matthew Good album) (1994)
