= Beautiful Midnight =

1999 studio album by the Matthew Good Band

Studio album by Matthew Good Band
- Released: September 14, 1999 (Canada); January 30, 2001 (United States)
- Recorded: February – April 1999
- Studio: Greenhouse Studios, Burnaby, British Columbia, Canada; Mixed at NRG Recording Studios Los Angeles, California, United States
- Genre: Alternative rock; post-grunge; power pop
- Length: 65:15
- Label: Universal (Canada); Atlantic (U.S.)
- Producer: Warne Livesey

Matthew Good Band chronology
Lo-Fi B-Sides (EP) (1998)	Beautiful Midnight (1999)	Loser Anthems (EP) (2001)

Singles from Beautiful Midnight
- 1. "Hello Time Bomb" Released: August 1999; 2. "Load Me Up" Released: December 1999; 3. "Strange Days" Released: March 2000; 4. "The Future Is X-Rated" Released: June 2000

Professional ratings
Review scores
Source	Rating
AllMusic	4/5 stars
Sputnikmusic	4.5/5 stars
Punknews.org	4.5/5 stars

Beautiful Midnight is the third album released by the Matthew Good Band. It is the band's most commercially successful album. The album was voted as the best Canadian album of 1999 by readers of the music magazine Chart. The album also won the award for "Best Rock Album" at the 2000 Juno Awards.

The album produced four successful singles ("Hello Time Bomb", "Load Me Up", "Strange Days", and "The Future is X-Rated"). Each single was accompanied by a music video, all which received frequent airplay on MuchMusic.

The success of Beautiful Midnight propelled Good to a celebrity status in Canada he eventually grew to loathe, and his interactions with the media throughout the promotional cycle for the record were often strained and unpleasant.

== Commercial performance ==
Beautiful Midnight debuted at #1 on the Canadian Albums Chart, selling approximately 25,000 copies in its first week. It would go on to become the band's best-selling album, being certified Double Platinum in Canada on September 7, 2000. By March 2003, the album had sold 270,000 units in Canada. By 2016, the album had sold over 300,000 copies, achieving Triple Platinum status. Between 1996 and 2016, Beautiful Midnight was among the top 20 best-selling albums by Canadian bands in Canada.

== Publicity ==
The album did not achieve the kind of success in United States as it did in Canada partially due to Good being uncooperative in playing along with the media and music industry in the country.

In a 2016 interview with The Canadian Press, Good recounted one interview with Seventeen magazine at its Manhattan office where two female writers ("...who looked like the Stepford Wives") asked the singer to recall his first kiss. Annoyed by the question, he recounted a story where as a teenager he engaged in a drunken session that became sexual. The writers, Good says, were so taken back by his explicit story that they walked out of the interview.

The band was also reluctant to commit to extensively touring the United States.

== Versions ==
The album was re-released in 2001 in the United States on Atlantic Records with an altered track listing with remixed songs from Underdogs. Good has referred to it as something of a greatest hits.

A number of songs considered for inclusion on Beautiful Midnight were relegated to b-side or unreleased status. "Flashdance II" was eventually released on Loser Anthems, while "Pony Boy", which was recorded for the subsequent album The Audio of Being, remained unreleased until In a Coma in 2005.

The album was re-released in 2016 on LP and climbed to the top of the Canadian vinyl chart in January.

Sales of the LP were enough to convince Good to re-record some of the songs for a five-track EP titled I Miss New Wave: Beautiful Midnight Revisited. It was released on December 2, 2016, alongside an accompanying tour in 2017 in which Good performed the Beautiful Midnight album in its entirety. Good said he picked songs from "Beautiful Midnight" he thought could be improved or reworked to reflect "greater maturity" and more technical restraint.

== Track listing ==
All tracks written by Matthew Good and Dave Genn, except where noted.

In the fashion of a concept album, the track listing uses the conceit that the album represents one night, with each song corresponding to a one-hour period leading from "05:00 pm" ("Giant") through midnight ("Let's Get It On") and ending with "Sunup" ("Running For Home").

No.	Title	Length
1.	"Giant"	6:10
2.	"Hello Time Bomb"	3:58
3.	"Strange Days"	4:25
4.	"I Miss New Wave"	5:04
5.	"Load Me Up" (Good, Genn, Priske, Browne)	3:40
6.	"Failing the Rorschach Test"	4:45
7.	"Suburbia"	5:26
8.	"Let's Get It On"	4:16
9.	"Jenni's Song"	4:00
10.	"Going All The Way"	4:17
11.	"A Boy and His Machine Gun"	5:02
12.	"The Future Is X-Rated"	3:47
13.	"Born to Kill"	5:42
14.	"Running for Home"	4:38

=== US ===
(Titles were altered by Atlantic Records)

1. Giant
2. Hello Time Bomb
3. Strange Days
4. Deep 6ix
5. Load Me Up
6. Failing the Rorschach Test
7. Suburbia
8. Apparitions
9. Jenni's Song
10. Boy and His ------- ---
11. The Future Is X-Rated
12. Everything Is Automatic
13. Born to ----
14. Running for Home

("Hello Time Bomb", "Strange Days", "Deep 6ix", "Load Me Up", and "Everything Is Automatic" were remixed by Chris Lord-Alge. "Deep Six", "Apparitions", and "Everything Is Automatic" originally appeared on Underdogs.)

== Credits ==
- Matthew Good Band
  - Matthew Good - vocals, guitar
  - Ian Browne - drums
  - Rich Priske - bass guitar
  - Geoff Lloyd - bass guitar on "Deep 6ix", "Apparitions" and "Everything Is Automatic"
  - Dave Genn - Guitar, Keyboards

Additional personnel

- Todd Kerns - backing vocals on "Hello Time Bomb" and "Born To Kill"
- Natasha Duprey - Phone Sex on "The Future is X-Rated"
- Centennial High School Cheerleading Squad - Cheerleading on "Giant"
  - Kristy Holmes
  - Kimberly Barber
  - Melanie Barber
  - Sara Correia
  - Caroline Croteau
  - Kristin Sims
  - Karin Anstey
  - Tracey Mcdonald
  - Megan Leigh
  - Marjolyn Ustaris

Production

- Warne Livesey - Producer, Engineer, Mixer
- Zach Blackstone - Engineer
- Steve Kaplan (BJG Studios, London) - Mixer
- Chris Lord-Alge (BJG Studios, London) - Mixer
- Tim Young - Mastering
- Legal: Simkin & Co.
- Accounting: Davidson & Co.
- Ken Turta - Live sound
- Christi Thompson - Good's assistant
- Chimo Robichaud - Instrument technician
- Horshack - A&R
- Jay Blakesberg - Photography
- Vincent Libby - Design concept
- Garnet Armstrong - Album design
- Kiley Redhead - Album design

== Year-end charts ==
Chart (2000)	Position
Canadian Albums (Nielsen SoundScan)	69
