= Ian Browne (musician) =

Canadian musician and composer

Background information
- Born: Ian Robert Browne; November 12, 1973 (age 52)
- Origin: New Westminster, British Columbia, Canada
- Genres: Rock
- Instrument: Percussion
- Formerly of: Matthew Good Band, No Sinner

Ian Browne is a Canadian musician and composer, best known as the drummer for the Canadian rock group Matthew Good Band. He later played with the Vancouver blues rock band No Sinner.

== Matthew Good Band ==
Browne was the drummer for Matthew Good Band during the band's most commercially successful period. The band won Juno Awards in 2000 for Group of the Year (1999) and Rock Album of the Year (1999) for Beautiful Midnight. Beautiful Midnight sold more than 200,000 copies in Canada and was certified double platinum. Matthew Good Band released four studio albums and several EPs before disbanding in 2002.

Matthew Good Band releases during Browne's tenure include Last of the Ghetto Astronauts, Raygun, Underdogs, Lo-Fi B-Sides, Beautiful Midnight, Loser Anthems, The Audio of Being, and the greatest hits compilation In a Coma.

== Other work ==
Browne is credited on No Sinner's debut EP Boo Hoo Hoo, and played drums and produced tracks on their 2016 LP Old Habits Die Hard.

Browne has also worked as a composer for television; his credits include the science fiction series Flash Gordon and Sanctuary.

== See also ==
- Matthew Good Band discography
