= In a Place of Lesser Men =

Single by Matthew Good

from the album Lights of Endangered Species
- Released: March 29, 2011
- Genre: Alternative rock
- Length: 3:09
- Songwriter(s): Matthew Good
- Producer(s): Warne Livesey

Matthew Good singles chronology
"Us Remains Impossible" (2009)	"In a Place of Lesser Men" (2011)	"Zero Orchestra" (2011)

"In a Place of Lesser Men" is a song by Canadian singer-songwriter Matthew Good. It was released as the lead single from Good's fifth solo album, Lights of Endangered Species. The song was first streamed via SoundCloud on March 21 and was officially released on March 29, 2011.

== Charts ==
Chart (2011)	Peak position
Canadian Alternative Rock Chart	12

== Credits ==
- Blake Manning: Drums
- Brenda Fedoruk: Flute
- David Owen: Cor Anglais
- Jennifer Zall: Backing Vocal
- Stuart Cameron: Guitar, Lap Steel
- Matthew Good: Piano, Bass, Guitar, Vocals
