= White Light Rock & Roll Review =

2004 studio album by Matthew Good

Studio album by Matthew Good
- Released: June 15, 2004
- Recorded: Mushroom Studios and Warehouse Studios, Vancouver, British Columbia, Canada
- Genre: Rock
- Length: 48:43
- Label: Universal Music Canada
- Producer: Warne Livesey

Matthew Good chronology
Avalanche (2003)	White Light Rock & Roll Review (2004)	In a Coma:1995-2005 (2005)

Singles from White Light Rock & Roll Review
- 1. "Alert Status Red" Released: 2004; 2. "In Love With A Bad Idea / It's Been A While Since I Was Your Man" Released: 2004

Professional ratings
Review scores
Source	Rating
AllMusic	3.5/5 stars
CHARTattack	4.5/5 stars
Tiny Mix Tapes	3.5/5 stars

White Light Rock & Roll Review is Matthew Good's second album as a solo artist, and was released on June 15, 2004. Though not as well-received as his previous solo effort, Avalanche, it quickly achieved Gold certification in Canada.

Recording sessions for White Light Rock & Roll Review began less than a year after the release of Avalanche, making it the shortest time spent between records for Good. Having become disenchanted with the state of recorded music, Good became enamored with the techniques employed by classic artists like Led Zeppelin and The Who, who spent much of their careers perfecting their live shows and recording albums live off the floor. To this end, Good sought to write songs that could best be conveyed to live audiences. In fact, many of the record's tracks (including "Little Terror", "North American for Life", "Blue Skies Over Bad Lands", "It's Been A While Since I Was Your Man", and "Ex-Pats of the Blue Mountain Symphony Orchestra") were written and performed live, well in advance of the album's release.

== Track listing ==
All tracks written by Matthew Good, except where noted.

No.	Title	Length
1.	"Put Out Your Lights"	2:03
2.	"Poor Man's Grey"	2:22
3.	"We're So Heavy"	4:36
4.	"Empty Road"	3:29
5.	"Alert Status Red"	4:25
6.	"Little Terror"	3:07
7.	"In Love With a Bad Idea"	3:30
8.	"North American for Life" (Good, Thor Valdsen, Priske, Steward)	2:07
9.	"Blue Skies Over Bad Lands"	8:14
10.	"It's Been a While Since I Was Your Man"	3:40
11.	"Buffalo Seven"	3:20
12.	"Ex-Pats of the Blue Mountain Symphony Orchestra" ("Ex-Pats of the Blue Mountain Symphony Orchestra" ends at 4:17; at 4:49, after 31 seconds of silence, a hidden track called "Hopeless" plays)	7:45

== Miscellanea ==
- "In Love With a Bad Idea" contains lyrics which were once a part of a short poem by Good entitled "Paris Hilton's Vagina".
- "North American for Life" came about as a result of impromptu jam sessions between Good and his live bandmembers while on tour for his previous album, Avalanche.
- "Blue Skies Over Bad Lands" was recorded live in one take. Livesey recorded a practice take that the band was performing so that mic levels could be set for the "real" recording. After listening back to the practice take, Good and producer Warne Livesey felt they had captured "something special" and that another take wasn't necessary.
- "Buffalo Seven" receives its title from that of a poster displaying a posse of seven cowboys which Good once hung over his bed.
- "Ex-Pats of the Blue Mountain Symphony Orchestra", is said to be about fights Good was involved in during his youth. It is said to be a homage to The Who, whose influence was cited by Good as an inspiration for the record. The song bears many similarities to The Who's classic, "Won't Get Fooled Again".
- "Hopeless" was not included as part of the official track listing, contrary to Good's wishes, as a result of pressure by his record label who felt that the song was too country for the album.
- "Alert Status Red", "In Love With A Bad Idea", and "Buffalo Seven" were all added after the initial recording session for the album. This was done at the suggestion of the record label, who were concerned that the record lacked any marketable singles.
- Known b-sides for White Light Rock & Roll Review include "Dusk" and "Can't Get Shot in the Back (If You Don't Run)". The former was recorded during the early hours of the morning at the Warehouse Studios in Vancouver on an old piano after initial recording sessions for the album were complete. It was eventually offered for purchase via Puretracks, to coincide with the release of the album's first single, "Alert Status Red". A demo for "Can't Get Shot in the Back (If You Don't Run)" was recorded after the record had been mixed and was streamed on Good's website. The song was later re-recorded properly in a studio for the Hospital Music sessions and offered as a free download for matthewgood.org community members.

== Personnel ==
- Matthew Good - vocals, guitar, art direction
- Christian Thor Valdson - guitar
- Pat Steward - drums, percussion
- Rich Priske - bass guitar
- Warne Livesey - Producer, engineer, mixer
- Scott Ternan - Assistant engineer
- Joel Livesey - Assistant engineer
- Zach Blackstone - Assistant engineer
- Kirk McNally - Assistant engineer
- Garnet Armstrong - Album design
- Ivan Otis - Photography
- Liza Visagie - Cover art (Second Beach Three and Second Beach Four)
- Mastered by Tim Young at Metropolis, London, UK
