= Vancouver (album) =

2009 studio album by Matthew Good

Studio album by Matthew Good
- Released: October 6, 2009
- Recorded: January 4–29, 2009, Warehouse Studios, Vancouver, BC
- Genre: Rock
- Length: 57:12
- Label: Universal Music Canada
- Producer: Matthew Good

Matthew Good chronology
Live at Massey Hall (2008)	Vancouver (2009)	Lights of Endangered Species (2011)

Singles from Vancouver
- 1. "Last Parade" Released: August 14, 2009; 2. "Us Remains Impossible" Released: 2009

Professional ratings
Review scores
Source	Rating
AllMusic	3.5/5 stars
Brock Press	(favorable)
CHARTattack	4/5 stars
Toro	3.5/5 stars

Vancouver is the fourth studio album by Matthew Good, released on October 6, 2009.

The album is a concept album, critically reflecting on Good's hometown city of Vancouver, British Columbia, Canada. In particular, the album is influenced by the social issues in the city's Downtown Eastside and the extreme disparities of wealth between Vancouver neighbourhoods.

As Good had fulfilled his recording contract with Universal Music Canada with his previous 2007 release, Hospital Music, he re-signed with the record label in early 2009 upon beginning studio recording. Contributing artists on Vancouver include Peter Yorn, who sings backup vocals on the ninth track "The Vancouver National Anthem".

Vancouver won the award for "Rock Album of the Year" at the 2011 Juno Awards, making it the second time Good won the award, the first being in 2000 for Beautiful Midnight.

== Promotion and commercial performance ==
The release of Vancouver was announced by Good on his website in July 2008. Months prior to the announcement, the album's eventual second track "The Boy That Could Explode" was previewed for fans on Good's website on Christmas Day in 2007. Good began streaming the album's first single "Last Parade" on August 14, 2009. Good began streaming Vancouver on his website on September 5, 2009, a little over a month before its release.

Vancouver debuted at #2 on the Canadian Albums Chart, selling 11,000 copies in its first week.

The album was certified Gold in Canada on November 18, 2011.

== Track listing ==
All tracks written by Matthew Good.

No.	Title	Length
1.	"Last Parade"	5:55
2.	"The Boy Who Could Explode"	7:07
3.	"Great Whales of the Sea"	3:31
4.	"Us Remains Impossible"	4:45
5.	"On Nights Like Tonight"	4:22
6.	"Volcanoes"	5:03
7.	"A Silent Army in the Trees"	5:37
8.	"Fought to Fight It"	4:23
9.	"The Vancouver National Anthem"	6:51
10.	"Empty’s Theme Park"	9:29
