= Lights of Endangered Species =

2011 studio album by Matthew Good

Studio album by Matthew Good
- Released: May 31, 2011
- Recorded: October 19 – November 20, 2010
- Genre: Alternative rock
- Length: 43:07
- Label: Universal Music Canada
- Producer: Warne Livesey

Matthew Good chronology
Vancouver (2009)	Lights of Endangered Species (2011)	Arrows of Desire (2013)

Singles from Lights of Endangered Species
- 1. "In a Place of Lesser Men" Released: March 29, 2011; 2. "Zero Orchestra" Released: 2011

Professional ratings
Review scores
Source	Rating
AllMusic	3/5 stars

Lights of Endangered Species is the fifth studio album by Canadian musician Matthew Good and was issued on May 31, 2011. Its first single, "In a Place of Lesser Men", was released via SoundCloud two months prior, on March 21, 2011. The track "Non Populus" was published four days later. Five days ahead of the album's release, the entire record was made available to stream online via ExploreMusic. It debuted at #5 on the Canadian Albums Chart. Lights of Endangered Species was nominated for Rock Album of the Year at the 2012 Juno Awards.

== Background ==
Produced by Warne Livesey, Lights of Endangered Species marked the sixth record he and Good had worked on together (including Matthew Good Band discography). While Good's lyrics on Lights remain socio-political and personal in nature, the album marks a departure from his rock-driven style, with layered arrangements and instrumentation featuring horns, strings, woodwinds, and piano—a reflection of Good's musical upbringing and tastes, listening to big bands from Glenn Miller to Count Basie, as well as modern jazz, such as Miles Davis and Mingus. Good also singled out the horn section on Simon and Garfunkel's "Keep the Customer Satisfied" as a particular influence for the album's fifth track, "Zero Orchestra". The musical style marked an effort from Good and Livesey to create something that was not necessarily "commercially viable", an idea that the two first discussed when they were mixing 1997's Underdogs. Good has recalled writing what would be the eighth track on Lights, "Set Me on Fire", as having re-energized the concept.

Good and Livesey first experimented with a Vancouver-based group of musicians to play the horns on the album but described the results as "horrifying". They subsequently contacted Nashville-based Terry Townson, whom they ultimately stuck with, on the advice of the Odds' Craig Northey. Townson, in turn, brought in other musicians to complete the recording. Lights also features Good's daughter singing in the background on "Shallow's Low".

== Track listing ==
All tracks written by Matthew Good.

No.	Title	Length
1.	"Extraordinary Fades"	2:54
2.	"How It Goes"	4:02
3.	"Shallow's Low"	5:06
4.	"What If I Can't See the Stars Mildred?"	5:11
5.	"Zero Orchestra"	4:46
6.	"Non Populus"	8:21
7.	"In a Place of Lesser Men"	3:10
8.	"Set Me on Fire"	5:23
9.	"Lights of Endangered Species"	4:21

== Credits ==
- Matthew Good – piano, guitar, bass, claratron (Note: This otherwise unknown instrument is listed in the liner notes as being played by Good), vocals
- Stuart Cameron – guitar, lap steel
- Blake Manning – drums, percussion, glockenspiel, backing vocals
- David Harding – viola
- Andrew Brown – viola
- Mary Sokol Brown – violin
- David Brown – double bass
- Brenda Fedoruk – flute
- François Houle – clarinet
- David Owen – cor anglais
- Ingrid Chiang – bassoon
- Warne Livesey – organ, mellotron
- Terry Townson – trumpet, flugelhorn
- Rod Murray – trombone
- Oliver De Clercq – French horn
- Bill Runge – baritone saxophone
- Jeremy Berkman – trombone
- Brad Muirhead – bass trombone
- Avery Grace – backing vocals
- Jennifer Zall – backing vocals
- Warne Livesey – producer, mixer, engineer
- Joel Livesey – engineer
- Rob Sommerfeldt, Jennifer Zall, Paul Dutil – session assistants
- Tim Young – mastering at Metropolis, London, UK
- Bernie Breen – management
- Jenn Pressey and Sarah Osgoode – assistants
- Shawn Marino – A&R, Universal Music
- Matthew Good and Susan Michalek – art direction
- Susan Michalek – design
- Miriam Aroeste – cover artwork

Recorded and mixed at Vogville Recording, Port Coquitlam, Canada
Strings, brass, and woodwinds arranged by Matthew Good and Warne Livesey
