= Rico (song) =

Single by Matthew Good Band

from the album Underdogs
- Released: 1998
- Recorded: Greenhouse Studios; Burnaby, British Columbia, Canada
- Genre: Alternative rock
- Length: 3:26
- Label: Darktown Records, Mercury
- Songwriters: Matthew Good, Ian Browne, Geoff Lloyd, Dave Genn
- Producer: Warne Livesey

Matthew Good Band singles chronology
"Apparitions" (1998)	"Rico" (1998)	"Hello Time Bomb" (1999)

"Rico" is a song by Matthew Good Band. It was released as the fourth single from their second studio album, Underdogs, and peaked at #23 on Canada's Singles Chart. It was a staple in the group's concerts and was unplayed by Matthew Good in his solo career until 2025.

== Track listing ==
No.	Title	Length
1.	"Rico (album version)"	3:26
2.	"Rico (clean version)"	3:24

== Music video ==
The music video for "Rico" is a continuation from the "Apparitions" video. It features Good's janitor character going to a nightclub and includes the call girl entering and having a drink after her traumatic experience in the previous video.

It is the band's final video with bassist Geoff Lloyd, who quit the band after filming.

== Charts ==
Chart (1998–99)	Peak position
Canada Top Singles (RPM)	23
