= Hello Time Bomb =

1999 single by Matthew Good Band

Single by Matthew Good Band

from the album Beautiful Midnight
- Released: 1999
- Length: 3:58
- Label: Universal Music Canada
- Songwriters: Matthew Good, Dave Genn
- Producer: Warne Livesey

Matthew Good Band singles chronology
| "Rico" (1998) | "Hello Time Bomb" (1999) | "Load Me Up" (1999) |

Music video
- "Hello Time Bomb" on YouTube

Hello Time Bomb is a song by Canadian alternative rock group Matthew Good Band. It was released in 1999 as the lead single from their third studio album, Beautiful Midnight. The song was voted as the second best song of 1999 by readers of music magazine Chart and was nominated for Best Single at the 2000 Juno Awards. Commercially, the song peaked at number three on the Canadian RPM Rock Report and number 34 on the US Billboard Modern Rock Tracks chart, becoming Matthew Good's only charting hit in the United States. Between 1995 and 2016, it was the fourth-most-played song by a Canadian artist on rock radio stations in Canada.

== Song information ==
Matthew Good mentions that he wrote the song quickly on an old acoustic guitar at a friend's place.

Sometimes the unexpected happens. Years ago I had a day off during the making of Beautiful Midnight. Two friends had dropped by my place to get me, as we were going out. While sitting there, we somehow got into a discussion about writing quick songs about nothing. So I picked up this crappy old classical guitar that belonged to my ex-girlfriend and proceeded to play do-do-do-do-do…click-click-click-click-click-click-click-click-click-click-click-click-click-click…do-do-do-do-do. And then the words came – 'I found me a reason, so check me tomorrow, we'll see if I'm leaking, push and push and push till it hurts ...'

In about 45 minutes I had what would basically be Hello Time Bomb, which later that night I quickly recorded onto a cassette and we tracked the very next day.
Sometimes the unexpected happens.

Of course, never in my wildest dreams did I think that that song would go on to become one of my biggest singles. I mean let's face it, I wrote it on a dust covered classical guitar that had been sitting unused behind a large plant for years. But, in the end, that's how it happened.

— Matthew Good

== Music video ==
This was the first music video including Rich Priske, who joined the band after Geoff Lloyd quit in 1998.

The music video for "Hello Time Bomb" reached number one on MuchMusic Countdown.

== Charts ==
=== Weekly charts ===
| Chart (1999–2001) | Peak position |
|---|---|
| Canada (Nielsen SoundScan) | 26 |
| Canada Rock/Alternative (RPM) | 3 |
| US Alternative Airplay (Billboard) | 34 |
| US Active Rock (Billboard) | 38 |

=== Year-end charts ===
| Chart (2001) | Position |
|---|---|
| Canada (Nielsen SoundScan) | 142 |

== Release history ==
| Region | Date | Format(s) | Label(s) | Ref. |
|---|---|---|---|---|
| Canada | 1999 | Radio | Universal Music Canada | |
| United States | December 5, 2000 | Active rock; alternative radio | Atlantic | |
| Australia | July 16, 2001 | CD | Universal Music Australia; Darktown | |
