= Alert Status Red =

Single by Matthew Good

from the album White Light Rock & Roll Review
- Released: 2004
- Genre: Alternative rock
- Length: 4:25
- Label: Universal
- Songwriter: Matthew Good
- Producer: Warne Livesey

Matthew Good singles chronology
"Near Fantastica" (2003)	"Alert Status Red" (2004)	"It's Been a While Since I Was Your Man" (2004)

Music video
- "Alert Status Red" on YouTube

"Alert Status Red" is a song by Canadian singer-songwriter Matthew Good. It was released as the lead single from Good's second solo album, White Light Rock & Roll Review. "Alert Status Red" is a song about terrorism and violence. The title of the song alludes to the United States terrorist warning system. The song was a hit in Canada, peaking at No. 2 on Canada's Rock chart. The song was the sixth most played song on Canadian rock radio stations in 2004.

== Music video ==
The music video for "Alert Status Red" was released on June 1, 2004, on Matthew Good's website. Good took the video down after receiving complaints because in addition to footage shot at Centennial School in Coquitlam, British Columbia, it also contained brief flashes of footage from the Columbine High School massacre.

After thinking on the matter for a while, Good put the video back on his website, with these comments:

"We are members of a violent society. We sell the world the majority of its weaponry; we are the foremost purveyors of nuclear weapons, chemical and biological weapons, and military hardware. And yet we love nothing more than to point the finger at others and claim that they are the cause of the world's love affair with violence. The truth of the matter is that we tend to hide from the fact that we are just as violent, that we are just as capable, that we do not dwell on some higher moral ground from which to cast blame and point fingers. Incidents such as what occurred at Columbine High School demonstrate this, as does the wanton aggression of world superpowers that claim to be acting in self-defense when the truth of the matter is that they're merely reaping the whirlwind of their own abusive conduct. Our responsibility is to wake up and realize these truths."
