= Last Parade (song) =

Single by Matthew Good

from the album Vancouver
- Released: 2009
- Genre: Alternative rock
- Length: 5:55; 4:27 (Radio edit)
- Label: Universal
- Songwriter(s): Matthew Good
- Producer(s): Matthew Good

Matthew Good singles chronology
"Black Helicopter (Live)" (2008)	"Last Parade" (2009)	"Us Remains Impossible" (2009)

"Last Parade" is the first single by Matthew Good from his fourth solo album, Vancouver. The single was first made available for streaming on August 14, 2009.

== Charts ==
Chart (2009)	Peak position
Canadian Hot 100	45
Canada Rock (Billboard)	6
