= Hospital Music =

2007 studio album by Matthew Good

Studio album by Matthew Good
- Released: July 31, 2007
- Recorded: January 22 – February 12, 2007, Warehouse Studios, Vancouver, BC
- Genres: Alternative rock, folk rock
- Length: 62:52
- Label: Universal
- Producer: Matthew Good

Matthew Good chronology
| In a Coma:1995–2005 (compilation) (2005) | Hospital Music (2007) | Live at Massey Hall (2008) |

Singles from Hospital Music
- 1. "Born Losers" Released: July 2007; 2. "I'm a Window" Released: October 2007; 3. "The Devil's in Your Details" Released: January 2008

Professional ratings
Review scores
| Source | Rating |
|---|---|
| AllMusic | 3.5/5 stars |
| Sputnikmusic | 4.5/5 stars |

Hospital Music is the third solo album by Canadian musician Matthew Good. It was released on July 31, 2007.

Good performed nearly all instruments himself, with the exception of drums and a few guitar and bass parts. The album artwork was painted by Vancouver artist Jeremy Crowle.

The album's lead single, "Born Losers", was featured as the "Single of the Week" on the American iTunes Store for the week starting July 31, 2007. The debut was significant due to Good's lack of previous success in the U.S. market, where he had previously released only one album—2001's Beautiful Midnight, which failed to make a major impact on U.S. charts.

Hospital Music was nominated at the 2008 Juno Awards for Best Rock Album.

== Commercial performance ==
Hospital Music debuted at #1 on the Canadian albums chart, selling over 11,000 copies in its first week of release. The album was certified Gold in Canada on January 16, 2008.

== Track listing ==
All tracks written by Matthew Good, except where noted.

| No. | Title | Length |
|---|---|---|
| 1. | "Champions of Nothing" | 9:35 |
| 2. | "A Single Explosion" | 3:04 |
| 3. | "Metal Airplanes" | 5:43 |
| 4. | "99% of Us Is Failure" | 5:39 |
| 5. | "Born Losers" | 5:21 |
| 6. | "Odette" | 3:31 |
| 7. | "Black Helicopter" | 4:46 |
| 8. | "The Boy Come Home" | 4:57 |
| 9. | "The Devil's in Your Details" (Matthew Good/Ryan Dahle) | 3:58 |
| 10. | "Moon Over Marin" (Dead Kennedys) | 3:10 |
| 11. | "Girl Wedged Under the Front of a Firebird" | 1:25 |
| 12. | "I Am Not Safer Than a Bank" | 0:55 |
| 13. | "I'm a Window" | 3:37 |
| 14. | "She's in It for the Money" | 5:09 |
| 15. | "True Love Will Find You in the End" (Daniel Johnston) | 2:02 |

== Songs ==
- "Champions of Nothing" was first introduced to fans during Good's 2006 acoustic tour, when it was known as "When Hollywood Runs Out of Indians", and used as an introduction to the song "Tripoli". This title, taken from the first line in the song, is inspired by Edward R. Murrow's famous 1958 speech to the Radio Television News Directors Association and, according to Good, "symbolizes the need to placate an ignorant, empty, self-centred culture".
- "Metal Airplanes" was written on an airplane during Good's trip to England, before personal circumstances forced him to return to Vancouver, where he suffered from the manic episodes that ultimately led to his hospitalization and treatment for bipolar disorder.
- "99% of Us Is Failure" was written for the mother of Good's best friend, Rod Bruno. Bruno's mother had recently been diagnosed with cancer.
- "Black Helicopter" is one of Good's more political songs, dealing with (among other things) COINTELPRO, the atrocities he believes were committed by the Bush administration, and the existence of black helicopters. It was made available for download on Good's site as a Christmas gift to fans in 2006.
- "The Boy Come Home" is "based on stories of paranoia and disparity felt by a handful of Iraq veterans that Good had been corresponding with". Though Good admits that "the story conveyed in the song is fictional, ... it is steeped in a psychology that, having corresponded with those veterans, is not". Good would revisit some of these themes on "A Silent Army in the Trees" from his 2009 album, Vancouver.
- "Girl Wedged Under the Front of a Firebird" contains looped samples of a story recounted by one of Vancouver's homeless residents, about a girl who was run over by a Pontiac Firebird for drug-related reasons. Good has been a strong advocate for Vancouver's homeless population, donating to various charities and raising awareness on his personal blog.
- Both "The Devil's in Your Details" and "I'm a Window" were also released as singles.
- "True Love Will Find You in the End" is a cover of a song by Daniel Johnston. Good became enamoured with Johnston's work after watching the film The Devil and Daniel Johnston. Though they do not suffer from the same condition, both Good and Johnston have struggled with mental illness throughout their careers.

== Personnel ==
- Matthew Good – vocals, guitar, bass guitar, keyboards, production
- Rod Bruno – lead guitar, bass guitar, vocals
- Pat Steward – drums, percussion
- Nadia Johnson – backing vocals on "Born Losers"
- Zach Blackstone – engineer, mixer
- Eric Mosher – assistant engineer
- Joao Carvalho – mastering
- Ryan Dahle – co-write and lead guitar on "The Devil's in Your Details"
