= Weapon (song) =

Single by Matthew Good

from the album Avalanche
- Released: October 7, 2002
- Recorded: 2002
- Genre: Alternative rock
- Length: 5:58; 4:55 (Radio edit)
- Label: Universal
- Songwriter: Matthew Good
- Producer: Warne Livesey

Matthew Good singles chronology
"Anti-Pop" (2002)	"Weapon" (2002)	"In a World Called Catastrophe" (2003)

"Weapon" is a song by Canadian alternative rock artist Matthew Good. It was the first song released by Good as a solo artist after the break-up of the Matthew Good Band. The song was released in October 2002 as the lead single from his debut solo album, Avalanche. The song peaked at No. 4 on Canada's Nielsen rock chart.

== Track listing ==
No.	Title	Length
1.	"Weapon (edit)"	4:50
2.	"Weapon (album version)"	6:05

== Music video ==
The music video for "Weapon" was directed by Matthew Good and Ante Kovac. It was filmed on October 5, 2002, at Pier 94. In a later commentary, Good related that Kovac's first edit of the video was far too standard, with gratuitous and generic fades. After firing Kovac, Good flew to Toronto and worked with video editor Jay Deschamps to re-craft the footage. While working on the edit, Good began to experiment with overlaying text and adding still frames and stock photos to help deliver the message. Good noted that the video was his favourite from his catalogue.

The video won the award for "Best Video" at the 2003 Juno Awards. Good did not attend the ceremony and Kovac accepted the award alone.

== In popular culture ==
- The song is featured on MuchMusic's compilation album Big Shiny Tunes 7.
- An excerpt of the song was used as the opening credits theme music for CTV's series The Eleventh Hour.
- The song was featured on Hockey Night in Canada in the opening montage for Game 5 of the 2011 Stanley Cup Finals.
- "Weapon" was also featured in the second-season finale of Smallville.
- The song is used in the second-season episode "A Higher Echelon" of the J. J. Abrams series Alias.
- The song appears in the third season of Queer As Folk.
- The song was featured in the first season of Flashpoint in the episode "Between Heartbeats".
