= Lo-Fi B-Sides =

1998 extended play by the Matthew Good Band

EP by Matthew Good Band
- Released: 1998
- Genre: Alternative rock
- Length: 11:56

Matthew Good Band chronology
| Underdogs (1997) | Lo-Fi B-Sides (1998) | Beautiful Midnight (1999) |

Lo-Fi B-Sides is the second EP released by Canadian rock group Matthew Good Band. The EP was limited to 5,000 copies and was included as a bonus with purchase of the band's 1997 album Underdogs. Because of the EP's rarity, Good opted to include the tracks in the deluxe edition of In a Coma.

== Track listing ==
1. "Born to Kill" [demo] (Matthew Good, Dave Genn) – 5:15
2. "Enjoy the Silence" (Martin Gore) – 3:12
3. "Fated" (Good) – 3:32

== Miscellanea ==
- All of the tracks from this release were yielded from early demo sessions for the 1999 album Beautiful Midnight.
- "Enjoy the Silence" is a cover of the Depeche Mode song from their 1990 album, Violator. It was also the only recorded cover song ever released by the Matthew Good Band.
