= New Meanies =

Band

- Also known as: Blue Meanies
- Origin: Winnipeg, Manitoba, Canada
- Genre: Blues rock
- Years active: 1990–present
- Labels: Virgin, independent
- Members: Damon Mitchell; Jeff Hondubura; Sky Onosson; Jason Kane
- Past members: Pat Wright; Frank Tront

The New Meanies, originally called the Blue Meanies, are a Canadian four piece rock band from Winnipeg.

== History ==
Formed around 1990 by high school friends Damon Mitchell (lead vocals, guitar, harmonica), Jeff Hondubura (guitar, vocals), Sky Onosson (bass, vocals, keyboards), and Jason Kane (drums, percussion) started playing blues-influenced rock.

After releasing two independent albums, Experience is Lost (independently released on cassette only) and The Blue Meanies, they toured extensively throughout Western Canada in the early 1990s. In 1996, the band signed with Virgin Records. The band changed its name to the New Meanies due to the existence of another Blue Meanies based in Chicago, and recorded a new album Three Seeds in the Los Angeles area with producer Howard Benson. In 1997, the band toured with Deep Purple in the United States.

Three Seeds was released in 1998, and the single "Letting Time Pass" achieved major airplay on radio and television, charting at No. 14 on RPM Magazine's Canadian rock/alternative chart. In 1998, following the release of the album, the band toured with the Dave Matthews Band across Canada. In 1999, the band performed in Toronto with Danko Jones and Tricky Woo and played several Canadian tour dates with Alice Cooper. In 2000, the band went indie again and released a new album, Highways, in 2001.

== Discography ==
=== Albums ===
- Experience is Lost (1993)
- The Blue Meanies (1995)
- Three Seeds (1998)
- Highways (2001)

== Current status ==
The New Meanies are currently only performing sporadically.
