= Raygun (album) =

1997 studio extended play by the Matthew Good Band

EP by Matthew Good Band
- Released: May 1997
- Genre: Alternative rock
- Length: 16:18
- Label: Independent / A&M Records

Matthew Good Band chronology
Last of the Ghetto Astronauts (1995)	Raygun (1997)	Underdogs (1997)

Professional ratings
Review scores
Source	Rating
AllMusic	3/5 stars

Raygun is an EP released by the Matthew Good Band in 1997. The EP was distributed by A&M Records on Matthew Good's own imprint, Darktown. It was the first MGB album recorded with guitarist Dave Genn as an official member of the band. The EP includes a re-recorded version of Last of the Ghetto Astronauts song, "Haven't Slept In Years".

== Track listing ==
All tracks written by Matthew Good, except where noted.

1. "Raygun" – 3:17
2. "Generation X-Wing" – 4:32 (Good, Genn)
3. "Haven't Slept In Years (Alternate)" – 3:31
4. "Alabama Motel Room" – 3:22 (Good, Lloyd, Browne)
5. "So Long Mrs. Smith" – 1:36

== Production ==
Produced and engineered by Dale Penner for Paradise Alley Productions. Mixed by Clif Norrell at Ocean Way Recording, Los Angeles, CA, except Alabama Motel Room, which was produced and engineered by John Shepp and remixed by Clif Norrell. Recorded at Greenhouse Studios and Utopia Parkway Studios, Vancouver, BC. Mastered by Stephen Marcussen at Precision Mastering, Los Angeles, CA.

== Band members ==
- Matthew Good - vocals, guitar
- Geoff Lloyd - bass guitar
- Ian Browne - drums
- Dave Genn - guitar, keyboards
