= In a World Called Catastrophe =

Single by Matthew Good

from the album Avalanche
- Released: January 2003
- Length: 5:57; 4:03 (radio edit)
- Label: Darktown; Universal
- Songwriter(s): Matthew Good
- Producer(s): Warne Livesey

Matthew Good singles chronology
"Weapon" (2002)	"In a World Called Catastrophe" (2003)	"Near Fantastica" (2003)

"In a World Called Catastrophe" is a song by Canadian rock artist Matthew Good. It was released in January 2003 as the second single from his debut solo album, Avalanche. The song reached number 5 on Canada's Singles Chart. As with the previous single "Weapon", the song features accompaniment by the Vancouver Symphony Orchestra. The song was featured on the 8th edition of the Canadian series of Now That's What I Call Music.

== Track listing ==
1. In A World Called Catastrophe (Radio Edit) - 4:03
2. In A World Called Catastrophe (Video Version) - 4:40
3. In A World Called Catastrophe (Album Version) - 5:57

== Music video ==
The music video for "In a World Called Catastrophe" was directed by Kyle Davison and premiered in early 2003. The video has a strong anti-war viewpoint.

== Charts ==
Chart (2003)	Peak position
Canada (Nielsen SoundScan)	5
