= Indestructible (Matthew Good Band song) =

Single by Matthew Good Band

from the album Underdogs
- Released: March 9, 1998
- Recorded: 1997
- Genre: Alternative rock
- Length: 3:24
- Label: Darktown Records
- Songwriter(s): Matthew Good; Dave Genn
- Producer(s): Warne Livesey

Matthew Good Band singles chronology
"Everything Is Automatic" (1997)	"Indestructible" (1998)	"Apparitions" (1998)

"Indestructible" is the second single from Matthew Good Band's second studio album, Underdogs. The song peaked at #7 on Canada's Alternative chart. The song is featured on MuchMusic's Big Shiny 90s compilation. It continues to receive airplay on Canadian rock radio stations.

The song was heavily sampled in British band Simple Minds' single "Cry", though songwriters Matthew Good and Dave Genn were never credited.

== Charts ==
Chart (1998)	Peak position
Canada Alternative 30 (RPM)	7
