= Everything Is Automatic =

"Everything is Automatic"

Single by Matthew Good Band

from the album Underdogs
- Released: November 10, 1997
- Recorded: 1997; Greenhouse Studios, Burnaby, British Columbia, Canada
- Genre: Alternative rock
- Length: 4:17
- Label: Darktown; Mercury (Canada); Polygram (US)
- Songwriters: Matthew Good; Dave Genn
- Producer: Warne Livesey

Matthew Good Band singles chronology
"Raygun" (1997)	"Everything is Automatic" (1997)	"Indestructible" (1998)

Music video
- "Everything Is Automatic" on YouTube

"Everything is Automatic" is a song by the Matthew Good Band. It was released as the lead single from the band's second studio album, Underdogs.

== Track listing ==
No.	Title	Length
1.	"Everything Is Automatic - album version (clean)"	4:14
2.	"Everything Is Automatic - single edit (clean)"	3:54
3.	"Everything Is Automatic - album version (remix)"	4:20

== Inspiration ==
In a 1997 interview, Good said that he was inspired to write "Everything Is Automatic" after watching a television program about liposuction:

"I was watching some show about how this woman had to get this (stuff) sucked out of her hips so she could fit into her dress to go to an opera," says Good. "It's a song about how things are so accessible. People used to worry about things like making sure there was gas in the truck so they could drive their wares to market and now they're worried about getting a new nose. And I find that pathetic."

== Music video ==
The music video for "Everything Is Automatic" was directed by Bill Morrison and filmed in Burnaby in October, 1997. The video features several up-close, zoomed and defocussed shots of the band preparing and performing for a video shoot. These are intermixed with fast-action shots of various streets and computer-generated billboards with catchphrases like "Think of your future, prepare for the distaster [sic]" and "Everything is allright [sic]".

The video was nominated for "Best Video" at the 1998 Juno Awards.

== Charts ==
Chart (1997–98)	Peak position
Canada Alternative 30 (RPM)	11
Canada Top Singles (RPM)	32
