= Strange Days (Matthew Good Band song) =

2000 single by Matthew Good Band

Single by Matthew Good Band

from the album Beautiful Midnight
- Released: 2000
- Length: 4:25
- Label: Universal Music Canada
- Songwriters: Matthew Good; Dave Genn
- Producer: Warne Livesey

Matthew Good Band singles chronology
"Load Me Up" (1999)	"Strange Days" (2000)	"The Future Is X-Rated" (2000)

Music video
- "Strange Days" on YouTube

"Strange Days" is a song by Canadian alternative rock band Matthew Good Band. It was released as the third single from the band's third studio album, Beautiful Midnight. The song peaked at number six on Canada's RPM Top 30 Rock Report. In May 2001, the song was serviced to US rock radio.

== Music video ==
The music video for "Strange Days" depicts a young homeless girl begging for change outside an office building, and being turned down by a woman passerby. Interspersed are "strange" happenings (such as the street turning to dusk) and a flashback sequence showing the girl running away from an abusive father. Throughout, a disheveled and unshaven Matthew Good is depicted interacting with the video's characters, though his presence goes unnoticed. At the climax of the song the woman leaves the building, once again dismissing the girl's and a still unnoticed Good's request for change. The young runaway watches as the woman steps off the curb into the path of an oncoming van. The runaway springs up to save the woman, sacrificing herself in the process. Fading in, the girl's ghost is shown watching paramedics as they close a body bag over her. She finally acknowledges Good, who is now clean shaven and wearing an all black suit, revealing his role as an angel. The final blurred shot depicts a little girl skipping down a tunnel toward a bright light and Good follows.

The video reached number one on the MuchMusic Countdown for two consecutive weeks between August 25 and September 1, 2000.

=== Awards and nominations ===
The video was nominated for Best Video, Best Director and Best Cinematography at the 2000 Much Music Video Awards.

== Charts ==
Chart (2000)	Peak position
Canada Rock/Alternative (RPM)	6

== Release history ==
Region	Date	Format(s)	Label(s)	Ref.
Canada	2000	Radio	Universal Music Canada	
United States	May 7, 2001	Triple A radio	Atlantic	
United States	May 8, 2001	Mainstream rock; active rock; alternative radio	Atlantic	
