= Last of the Ghetto Astronauts =

1995 studio album by the Matthew Good Band

Studio album by Matthew Good Band
- Released: December 8, 1995
- Recorded: 1995
- Genre: Alternative rock; indie rock
- Length: 52:01
- Label: Independent; A&M
- Producer: John Shepp

Matthew Good Band chronology
15 Hours On A September Thursday (Demo) (1994)	Last of the Ghetto Astronauts (1995)	Raygun (EP) (1997)

Singles from Last of the Ghetto Astronauts
- 1. "Alabama Motel Room" Released: 1995; 2. "Symbolistic White Walls" Released: June 1996

Professional ratings
Review scores
Source	Rating
AllMusic	2.5/5 stars

Last of the Ghetto Astronauts is the debut album of the Matthew Good Band. It was released independently in 1995 on a budget of roughly $5,000 CAD. With the singles "Alabama Motel Room" and "Symbolistic White Walls", the album achieved popularity, particularly in western Canada. The album was certified Gold in Canada on January 30, 2003.

The band was originally going to go with another name ("Snowaxe" and "Gandalf" have been mentioned by Matthew Good); however a radio station in Vancouver played "Alabama Motel Room" and announced the band as the Matthew Good Band, at which point it stuck.

== Album covers ==
Last of the Ghetto Astronauts has two album covers: the original, independent cover, with cursive writing along the bottom and the band name featured prominently, and the subsequent production company release, which uses block letters and a different text layout. Both albums have the same pictures.

== Track listing ==
All tracks written by Matthew Good, except where noted.

No.	Title	Length
1.	"Alabama Motel Room" (Good, Lloyd, Browne)	3:18
2.	"Symbolistic White Walls"	4:30
3.	"She's Got a New Disguise"	6:17
4.	"Native Son"	4:52
5.	"Vermilion"	4:49
6.	"Every Name Is My Name"	4:00
7.	"Haven't Slept in Years"	3:23
8.	"Radio Bomb"	3:09
9.	"Fearless"	5:15
10.	"The War Is Over" ("The War is Over" ends at 7:56; a hidden track called "Omissions of the Omen" begins at 9:03)	12:33

== Miscellanea ==
- The album's title comes from a six-minute song of the same name on Good's 1994 demo 15 Hours on a September Thursday.
- Two of the songs on Last of the Ghetto Astronauts were re-released on the EP Raygun (1996). Whereas the recording of "Alabama Motel Room" on Raygun is identical to that which appears on Last of the Ghetto Astronauts, the Raygun version of "Haven't Slept in Years" is completely redone (to the satisfaction of many fans).
- Not a single electric guitar was employed in the recording of this album. All guitars heard on the album were either acoustics or acoustics run through Marshall amplifiers.
- Multiple songs were cut from the album. One of these was titled "Revenge"; a video was posted on Geoff Lloyd's Facebook memorial page in 2010, showing the band working on the song during the recording of the album. Charlie Quintana played drums for this song. The video was taken down and is no longer available.

== Personnel ==
- Matthew Good Band
  - Matthew Good - vocals, guitar
  - Ian Browne - drums
  - Geoff Lloyd - bass guitar
- Dave Genn - organ, Rhodes piano
- Steve Black - Piano on track 9
- Judy Renouf - Cello on track 9
- John Shepp - Producer, mixer, percussion on track 4

Note: Terry Brown mixed tracks 1 & 2

- George Leger - Mastering
- George Jenkins - Layout & Design
- Recorded at Utopia Parkway Studios, Vancouver, British Columbia, Canada
- Manufacturer: Darktown Records
- Distributor: A&M Records, a division of PolyGram Inc.
- Words and music by Matthew Good

Except "Alabama Motel Room", music by Good/Lloyd/Browne
