= Apparitions (song) =

Single by Matthew Good Band

from the album Underdogs
- Released: June 1, 1998
- Recorded: 1997; Greenhouse Studios, Burnaby, British Columbia, Canada
- Genre: Alternative rock
- Length: 5:11; 4:00 (Radio edit)
- Label: Darktown Records, Mercury Records, Polygram Records
- Songwriters: Matthew Good, Dave Genn
- Producer: Warne Livesey

Matthew Good Band singles chronology
"Indestructible" (1998)	"Apparitions" (1998)	"Rico" (1998)

"Apparitions" is a song by Matthew Good Band. The third single released from the band's second studio album Underdogs, the song was very successful in Canada, being nominated for "Best Single" at the 1999 Juno Awards. The edited version of the song is featured on the MuchMusic compilation album, Big Shiny Tunes 3. Good regards "Apparitions" as one of his best compositions.

== Track listing ==
No.	Title	Length
1.	"Apparitions (album version)"	5:11
2.	"Apparitions (edit)"	4:00

== Music video ==
The video was filmed in Vancouver, with exterior shots of the Vancouver Central Library and interior shots of the Toronto Dominion Tower. Inside an office building at night, a janitor (Good) horses around the building while going about his work, pausing to stage a mock duel with the lobby security guard. Making his way down a corridor, the janitor bumps into a prostitute, who has been hired by the firm's recently terminated chief of securities. After drinking heavily, the chief shoots himself in the prostitute's presence, causing her to run out in distress. Good encounters the chief's body and calls the security guard, who is watching the prostitute sobbing in the elevator on his CCTV monitor. In between, a rising executive (Dave Genn) attends a cocktail party, unaware of Good mocking him in the elevator; another janitor (Geoff Lloyd) fills out crossword puzzles in a storage closet before falling asleep; an executive complains on the phone about his malfunctioning computer; an administrative assistant plays FreeCell at her desk; a second executive (Ian Browne) enters and exits a bathroom; and a third executive snorts lines of cocaine in a stall, causing a nosebleed.

The music video for "Apparitions" reached #1 on MuchMusic Countdown for the week of October 30, 1998.

=== Awards and nominations ===
The music video's director, Bill Morrison, won the award for Best Director at the 1998 MuchMusic Video Awards. The video was also nominated for "Best Video" at the 1999 Juno Awards.

== Charts ==
Chart (1998)	Peak position
Canada Alternative 30 (RPM)	6
Canada Top Singles (RPM)	59
