= Matthew Good =

Canadian musician (born 1971)

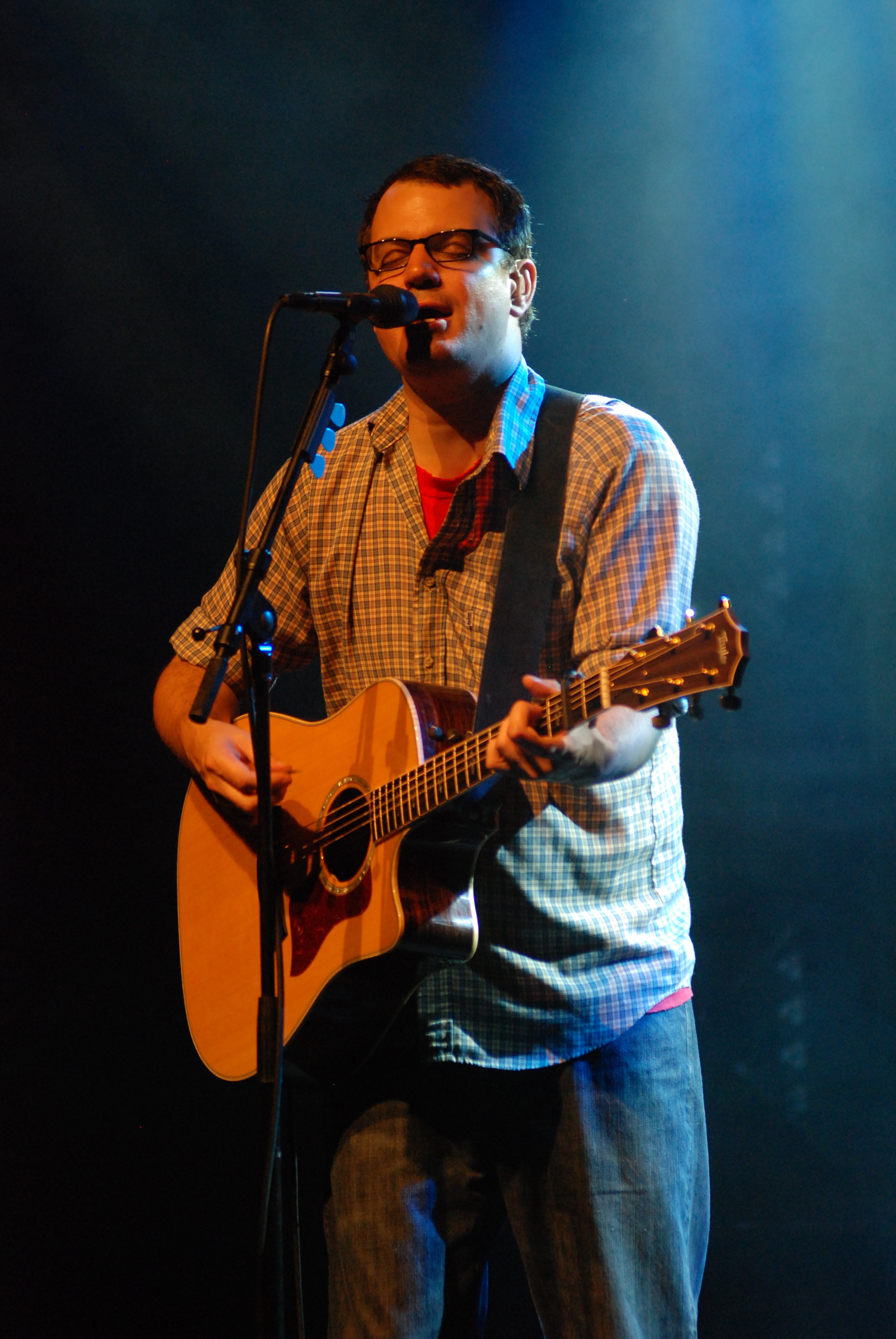
- Good performing in 2007

Background information
- Born: Matthew Frederick Robert Good; June 29, 1971 (age 55); Burnaby, British Columbia, Canada
- Origin: Coquitlam, British Columbia, Canada
- Genres: Alternative rock; folk rock; acoustic
- Occupations: Musician; writer
- Instruments: Vocals; guitar; piano; bass; percussion
- Years active: 1991–present
- Labels: Warner; Universal
- Website: matthewgood.org

Matthew Frederick Robert Good (born June 29, 1971) is a Canadian musician. He was the lead singer and songwriter for the Matthew Good Band, one of the most successful alternative rock bands in Canada during the 1990s and early 2000s. Since the band disbanded in 2002, Good has pursued a solo career and established himself as a political commentator and mental health activist. Between 1996 and 2016, with sales by Matthew Good Band included, Good was the 25th best-selling Canadian artist in Canada. Good has been nominated for 21 Juno Awards during his career, winning four.

== Early life and career ==
Matthew Good's father was a colonial Englishman from India and his mother was from British Columbia, Canada. Good's introduction into the music scene began while he was in high school, when he was asked by members of a folk group to write lyrics for them. Good then began singing with the group. Good taught himself to play guitar at age 20 and continued to write songs. Good's early career in music involved a variety of folk demos and a stint as the lead singer of a folk band, The Rodchester Kings. Matthew Good and guitarist Simon Woodcock were discovered at an open mic at Simon Fraser University by manager Brent Christensen. Early Rodchester Kings demos were recorded at Fragrant Time Records in Burnaby by Greg Wasmuth and Steven Codling.

From 1992 to 1993, Good recorded short demo tapes called Left of Normal, Broken, and Euphony, which featured the acoustic songs "Mercy Misses You", "Heather's Like Sunday", and the title track "Euphony". In 1994, he won a prize from 99.3 The Fox's Seeds, an annual competition of local Vancouver-based bands. The prize included recording time at a local studio/recording school, where, in September 1994, Good, along with band members Steve Codling, Judy Renouf, Eran Vooys, and Ariel Watson, recorded 15 Hours on a September Thursday. This demo tape included the songs "Second Sun", "The Ocean", and "Last of the Ghetto Astronauts". In December 1994, the band signed a publishing deal with EMI Publishing.

In March 1995, the original band went on tour across Canada. Upon returning home, the band split up and Matt started over with a new group of musicians.

== Matthew Good Band ==
=== Last of the Ghetto Astronauts (1995–1996) ===
Good formed a three-piece rock band in 1995 composed of him, drummer Charlie Quintana (later replaced by Ian Browne) and bassist Geoff Lloyd. Dave Genn originally only recorded with the band as a paid session musician. The four recorded the band's debut album, Last of the Ghetto Astronauts. The band released the album independently in 1995, after which Genn officially joined the band. The band was not originally called "Matthew Good Band". In fact, the first 5000 copies of Last of the Ghetto Astronauts were just titled "MGB". After the album was released, "Alabama Motel Room" began to receive significant radio airplay, and people began requesting the song on radio and the album at retail stores calling the band, "Matthew Good Band". At the time, the band had been having conversations about the band's name, but the band then decided that the band would be called "Matthew Good Band". Although initially popular only in the Vancouver area, the band began to have more success across Canada in 1996, with the singles "Alabama Motel Room" and "Symbolistic White Walls" becoming significant hits on radio and their music videos being played on MuchMusic. In December 1996, Matthew Good Band signed a two-album deal with Private Music.

=== Underdogs (1997–1999) ===
In mid-January 1997, on the first day of pre-production for their next album, the group was notified that BMG Entertainment North America was merging Private Music into Windham Hill/High Street Records, putting a halt to the production of the album. In mid-March, after negotiations, Windham Hill/High Street released the group from its contract. Good was paid what he was owed for the two albums, and the group then decided to record the new album regardless of label support, using the money received from the divorce of their contract with Windham Hill/High Street to fund it. The group then agreed to release the upcoming album under a distribution agreement with PolyGram Group Canada. After releasing the EP Raygun in May 1997, the band released their second full-length album, Underdogs, later that year. The album was produced by Warne Livesey, who would go on to produce every full-length MGB album and most of Good's subsequent solo albums. The album spawned the singles "Everything Is Automatic", "Indestructible", "Apparitions" and "Rico", all which were hits in Canada. In November 1998, Geoff Lloyd left the band and was shortly thereafter replaced by Rich Priske. On January 21, 1999, Underdogs was certified Platinum in Canada.

=== Beautiful Midnight (1999–2000) ===
In September 1999, the band released their next studio album, Beautiful Midnight. The album debuted at #1 on the Canadian Albums Chart and featured the hit singles "Hello Time Bomb", "Load Me Up", and "Strange Days". In January 2000, Good underwent vocal cord surgery after being diagnosed with sarcoidosis, prompting him to temporarily quit smoking. In March 2000, The band won two Juno awards for "Best Group" and "Best Rock Album". Good himself did not attend the ceremony, and guitarist Dave Genn has been quoted as saying that he only attended for the open bar. Beautiful Midnight became the band's best-selling album, being certified Double Platinum in Canada and selling over 300,000 copies by 2016. In 2000, the band's song "Running for Home" was featured in an episode of Higher Ground.

=== 2000–2001: The Audio of Being ===
In the summer of 2000, Good stayed in a hotel for three weeks in Whistler to work on songs for the new album. Good later wrote that he spent much of the time "trying to keep down food supplement bars, trying to forget the growing tension within the band, the high expectations of needing to produce 'hit songs' (whatever they are these days), throwing up, and trying to find some semblance of direction in my personal life". The band entered the studio in late 2000 to record the material. The sessions saw a great deal of intra-band turmoil. In February 2001, the band began a brief tour of the United States to promote the American release of Beautiful Midnight. In June 2001, the band released the EP Loser Anthems, and followed it with what would be the band's final tour in the summer. In August 2001, Dave Genn quit the band, though he returned four days later. The band released The Audio of Being on October 30, 2001.

=== Breakup ===
In November 2001, it was revealed that Genn had left the band again and Ian Browne had also left the band. In February 2002, Universal Music Canada confirmed that the band had broken up. In March 2002, during his first interview after the breakup was confirmed, Good stated that the breakup was "a conscious effort on everybody's part". In a 2009 interview for The Ongoing History of New Music, Good stated that he decided the band was done after The Audio of Being was released, citing him no longer wanting to placate the needs of the other band members and no one wanting to tour the record as reasons.

== Solo career ==
=== Avalanche (2003) ===
Good released his solo debut, Avalanche, in 2003. The album featured major stylistic differences from those recorded with the previous band. The album featured the Vancouver Symphony Orchestra on several tracks, including the first two singles, "Weapon" and "In a World Called Catastrophe". Good recorded the album with long-time MGB producer Warne Livesey, who earned a Juno nomination for the effort.

At the 2003 Juno Awards, Good and co-director Ante Kovac won the Juno Award for Video of the Year for "Weapon".

=== White Light Rock and Roll Review (2004) ===
Good's second solo album, White Light Rock & Roll Review, was released on June 15, 2004. Singles included "Alert Status Red" and "It's Been a While Since I Was Your Man". For the album, Good elected to take a stripped-down approach. Rather than record each instrument separately, Good and his new band (which consisted of himself, former MGB bassist Rich Priske, guitarist Christian Thor Valdson and drummer Patrick Steward) recorded the songs as a unit, with Good adding vocals and additional guitar parts later. Good later noted that he loved the freedom of being able to write a song, enter the studio, and have a recording completed almost immediately, rather than having to deal with the sometimes arduous process of recording layers and layers of music for a single song.

Good encountered controversy with the video for "Alert Status Red". Initially, the video was intended to be a concept piece, directed by Good. However, upon entering the editing stage, he realized he hadn't shot enough footage to make his concept work. He opted to turn all of the footage over to Kyle Davison, who directed the video for "In a World Called Catastrophe", to see if anything could be made out of it. Davison came up with his own concept, edited it together, and sent the finished product to Good. Good approved of the video, and made it available for download on his website. Good, however, was unaware that Davison had utilized several short clips of surveillance footage of the Columbine High School shootings in the piece. Upon hearing about the clips from individuals who felt the use was insensitive, Good pulled the video from his website. After watching it again, he decided to enlist the opinions of others, including MuchMusic, to see if they had any objections. Most felt it was reasonable, granted that the use wasn't exploitative and helped to support the message of the video, a message that they believed was decidedly relevant. Good agreed. He then returned the video to his website and expressed his support for the work of his co-director.

=== In a Coma, solo acoustic tour (2005–2006) ===
In March 2005, Good brought in Ryan Dahle and Meegee Bradfield of Limblifter to join his band (replacing Valdson and Priske). Good noted that he was concerned his previous line-up had run its course creatively, and that, as a solo artist, he was graced with the freedom to change direction by involving different musicians. He hoped that Dahle and Bradfield might be able to lend a new perspective to familiar material. In April, the lineup entered the studio and recorded two tracks for the Matthew Good best-of, "Big City Life" and "Oh Be Joyful". However, when Good undertook a brief tour of Ontario in July 2005, he was rejoined by Priske and Valdson.

A compilation of Good's work with the Matthew Good Band as well as his solo material was released in September 2005, titled In a Coma: Matthew Good 1995–2005. The first single from the album, "Oh Be Joyful", was released at the end of July.

Good took particular care in the production of the expanded deluxe edition of In a Coma, which included an additional CD and a DVD. In April 2005, Good entered the studio and recorded nine songs from his catalog, reworked and performed acoustically. As a nod to fans who were unable to find them, the CD also included all of the tracks from the out-of-print EPs Lo-Fi B-Sides and Loser Anthems. The DVD featured the complete library of Good's music videos, including a new video for "While We Were Hunting Rabbits" from Avalanche developed by animation students at Sheridan College.

Following the release of In a Coma, Good began demoing songs for a new album. While promoting In a Coma, Good noted that he might use the release of the compilation to mark the end of the first era of his career, where he could then move on to write "weirder" music. In December 2005, Good previewed a demo called "Black Helicopter", which he recorded at home using GarageBand on an Apple Power Mac G5.

In March 2006, Good embarked on a solo acoustic tour of Canada, which featured smaller crowds and more intimate settings. Good spent several weeks leading up to the tour reworking many of his older songs to fit a solo acoustic format, including rarities such as "Fated" and "Life Beyond the Minimum Safe Distance". He was joined on tour by opening act Melissa McClelland, with whom he played a cover of the Nine Inch Nails song "Hurt" at the end of his solo performances.

=== Hospital Music, live album (2007–2008) ===
In the aftermath of divorcing his wife, developing an addiction to Ativan and being diagnosed with bipolar disorder, Good channeled the emotional turmoil into his next album, 2007's Hospital Music. The album was the first self-produced effort of his career and was written during his recovery from overdosing on Ativan and a stay in the psychiatric ward. Hospital Music included thinly veiled allusions to his divorce ("I Am Not Safer Than a Bank" and "She's in It for the Money") as well as darker subjects, such as Good's close friend Rod Bruno (who appears on guitar, bass and vocals throughout the record) losing his father to cancer ("99% of Us Is Failure"). The album also featured two cover songs, a radically reworked version of the Dead Kennedys' "Moon Over Marin" and Daniel Johnston's "True Love Will Find You in the End". The album's first single "Born Losers" was also a success, peaking at #27 on the Canadian Hot 100.

Hospital Music was additionally influenced by Good's proximity to Vancouver's notorious Downtown Eastside neighbourhood, just blocks away from his Gastown loft. The opening sound bites in both "Girl Wedged Under the Front of a Firebird" and album-opener "Champions of Nothing" feature men narrating snippets of their experience from the impoverished neighbourhood.

Hospital Music debuted at the top of the Canadian albums chart, Good's first number one album since Beautiful Midnight. The album also marked the end of his recording and publishing contracts.

In support of Hospital Music, Good embarked on a brief solo tour of the United States in March 2008, and began a full-band tour of Canada in May.

In 2008, Good released Live at Massey Hall, the first live album of Matthew Good's career. Recorded at Toronto's landmark Massey Hall in May 2008, it is an unaltered recording of that night's performance.

=== Vancouver (2009–2010) ===
In July 2008, Good announced he had begun working on his fourth solo album to be titled Vancouver. After entering the studio in early 2009 to record Vancouver, Good confirmed that he had re-signed with Universal Music Canada and the new album would not be an indie release. The album was released on October 6, 2009. For about a month prior to its release, the album was made available on his website for free streaming, stating a desire to make his music as accessible as possible. The first single released from the album was "Last Parade."

Vancouver was a reflection of Good's experiences and opinions of his hometown. "It's kind of like the way we were, the way we are – that kind of thing," Good has explained, referring to a sense of the city's "depletion", mostly in regards to the situation in the Downtown Eastside. The album also continued to explore Good's personal life, including his mental illness. He later described the recording of Hospital Music and Vancouver as having together "closed chapters" regarding his personal life, allowing him to focus his energy on a stylistically different project for his next album.

A Canadian tour in support of Vancouver was announced in September 2009 and ran from October 3 to December 19. Joining Good and his band as a supporting act was fellow Vancouver-based group Mother Mother. The following year, Good toured the United States from March 8 to April 4, 2010.

In 2011, Vancouver won the "Juno Award for Rock Album of the Year", the second time Good has won the award.

=== Lights of Endangered Species (2011) ===
Good entered the studio on October 19, 2010, to record his fifth album as a solo artist, Lights of Endangered Species. He again worked with producer Warne Livesey, marking the sixth album Warne has produced with Good. Good and Warne's Facebook wall postings stated tracking was completed November 20, while mixing of the record was completed on December 11. The album was mastered in England during the first half of 2011 and was subsequently released on May 31. The track listing was released in the members section of matthewgood.org on January 13, 2011. The first single from the album, "In a Place of Lesser Men", was released on March 21 via SoundCloud. Good reunited with former MGB drummer Ian Browne during the tour of the album later in the year.

=== Arrows of Desire, Chaotic Neutral (2013–2015) ===
On November 5, 2012, Good announced via Facebook that he had entered the studio to begin recording his sixth solo studio album. The album's lead single, "Had It Coming", was released on May 28, 2013. The album, Arrows of Desire, was released on September 24, 2013. The album's audio was released to be streamed in Canada and Europe, as a promotion leading up to the album's release (September 17–24).

On July 17, 2015, Good released the song "All You Sons and Daughters", the first single from his seventh solo studio album, Chaotic Neutral. The album was released on September 25, 2015.

=== I Miss New Wave: Beautiful Midnight Revisited (2016) ===
In November 2016, Good announced on his website that he had been in the studio to re-record 5 tracks from the 1999 Matthew Good Band album, Beautiful Midnight. Good re-recorded Beautiful Midnight tracks "I Miss New Wave", "Suburbia", "Born to Kill", "Let's Get It On" and "Load Me Up" and released them on an EP titled I Miss New Wave: Beautiful Midnight Revisited, which was released on December 2, 2016. The EP was promoted by a tour during February and March 2017 in which Good performed the Beautiful Midnight album in its entirety.

=== Something Like a Storm, Moving Walls, Abuse allegations (2017–2024) ===
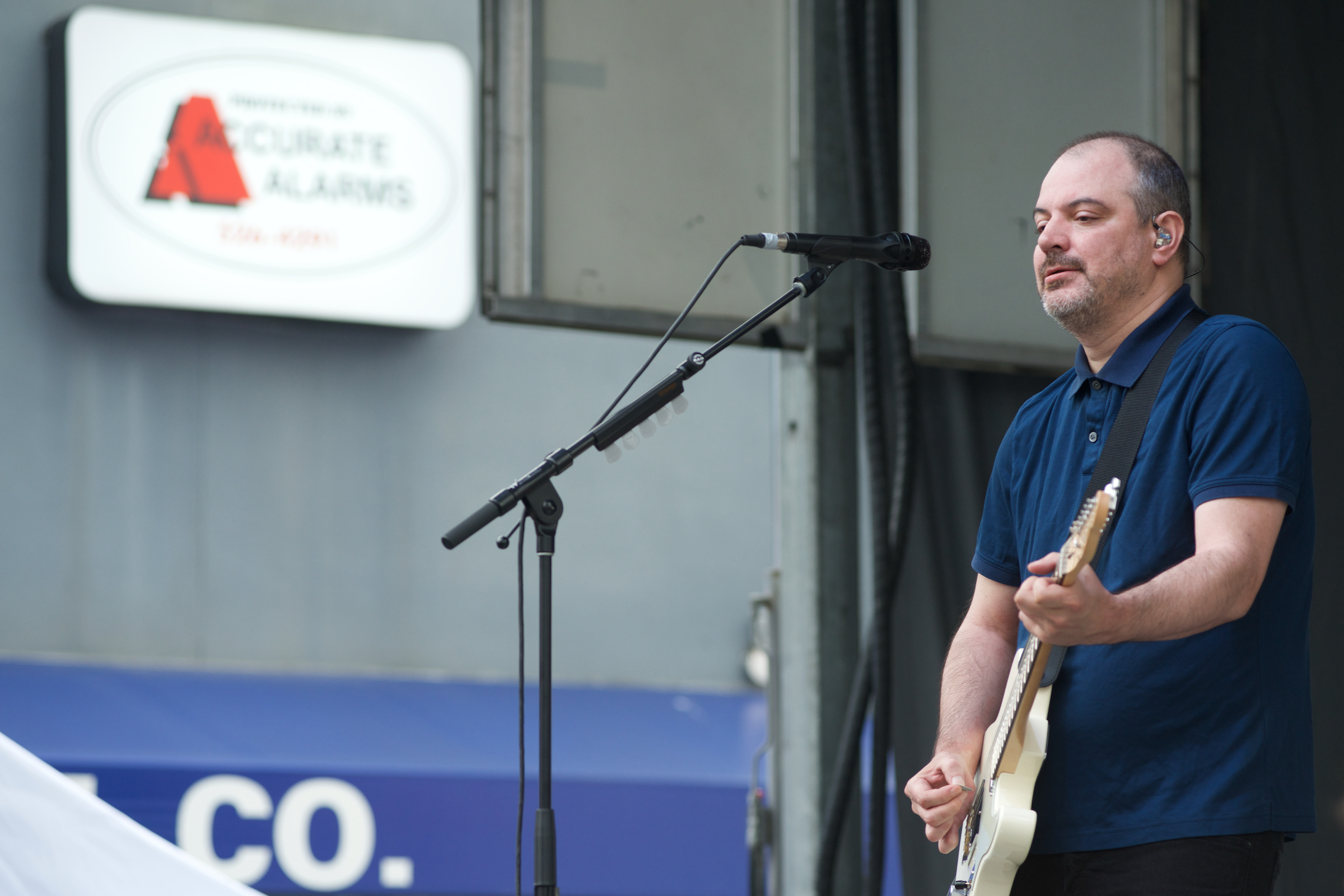
Matthew Good performs in New Westminster during the 2018 Recovery Day Festival in B.C.

On April 21, 2017, Good released a new song, titled "Bad Guys Win", from his upcoming album. A music video for the song was simultaneously released. On July 14, Good released the lead single from the album, "Decades", which was also accompanied by a music video. In September 2017, the album was announced as being titled Something Like a Storm. The album was released on October 20, 2017.

Good embarked on a co-headline tour across Canada with Our Lady Peace in March 2018. On March 27, during a performance in Edmonton, Good collapsed onstage due to pneumonia and was taken to a hospital. Good's performance for the next show on the tour was cancelled, but Good returned to the tour on March 30.

In 2019, Good embarked on his first solo acoustic tour since 2007. On October 18, 2019, Good released a new single, titled "Sicily". An accompanying music video was released on November 21, 2019. "Sicily" is taken from the 15-track album, Moving Walls, that was released in February 2020.

In 2021, Good was dropped by his label and management after an investigation into allegations made by his ex-girlfriend. Hayley Mather, accused him of being a "serial abuser" on her Instagram account, adding that during their relationship, he had cheated and constantly lied to her but also sexually coerced, groomed, emotionally and mentally abused, and manipulated her. She later added "I was told that fulfilling his fantasies were a way to bring our relationship closer together and that it would bring greater intimacy between he and I. It did not bring us closer together." Mathers continued that Good was aware she was vulnerable due to her postpartum depression following the birth of her daughter and that their relationship had caused mental health issues that necessitated her taking leave from work. Mathers also stated that she had been contacted by approximately 12 other women with similar stories of abuse and mistreatment by Good.

Good, who described Mather as his "ex-partner", denied these allegations on his Twitter account.

In October 2023, Good stopped playing guitar due to ulnar neuropathy. Because of that, Good has also stopped performing solo acoustic shows. All of his performances since October 2023 have been with a band, with one of his guitarists taking over his former guitar duties.

=== Zero Hours (2025–present) ===
Good released a new EP, Zero Hours, on October 3, 2025.

Also in 2025, Good cancelled his tour dates in the United States due to Donald Trump's presidency. The main reason was Canada cancelling the digital services tax. Good said this was done to "appease" Trump. Good also said he was worried that his visa could be rejected or he could be stopped at the border if he said negative things about Trump.

== Writing and political activism ==
Apart from his music career, Good has also been a writer and blogger. From late 1997 through the end of 2000, Good published a series of monthly "manifestos" on the band's website. Many of those were later compiled and released in his debut book At Last There Is Nothing Left To Say, published in 2001 by Insomniac Press (ISBN 1-894663-08-X).

In a 2001 interview, Good said regarding his writing: "It comes from the need inside of me to make fun of people. And my need to make fun of myself. I like writing things that are both intelligent and subversive. There's so much for me to write about – society has become so absolutely ridiculous."

In 2008, Good created a new website entitled Dear San Diego, on which he wrote fictional journal entries. The website no longer exists, though some of the text is still available on some fan sites.

Throughout his life, Good has displayed a passion for politics and history which is reflected in his music. He has commented that he would have become a history teacher had he not found success as a musician. For many years, he blogged on his website about political issues, including US foreign policy and human rights. Currently, his website no longer features a blog.

Good has been heavily involved with Amnesty International, bringing Amnesty representatives on the road with him during his 2004 tour and offering a limited-edition soccer jersey on his website with proceeds going to Amnesty. In 2004, his song "Annabelle" was exclusively released on the Amnesty International Canada website.

== Personal life ==
Good, whose family background is English, was born in Burnaby, British Columbia, and grew up in Coquitlam – both suburbs of Vancouver. After living in various parts of Vancouver for the majority of his career, Good moved to Maple Ridge around the time of Vancouver's 2009 release.

Good has been affected by ongoing bouts of mania and anxiety throughout his career, many of which he credited to the stresses of popularity. He recalls regularly passing out and vomiting during the time of The Audio of Being's recording in 2001. Behind the scenes of Good's 2005 release of In a Coma and his subsequent touring, Good's ongoing mental health concerns escalated, particularly following the unexpected separation from his first wife, Jennifer, in February 2006. In early 2006, prior to a solo acoustic tour of Canada, Good was prescribed Ativan to help counter his anxiety. During a stop in Kingston, Ontario, Good was rushed to the hospital following an adverse reaction to the Ativan. The last two shows of the tour were cancelled for what Good later explained was a "nervous breakdown".

The following summer, Good planned to spend several months in Europe to write a book. However, just a few days into the trip, Good found himself overwhelmed emotionally, experiencing what he described as the "absolute worst manic episode" while visiting friends in Bristol. He returned to Vancouver, moving into his parents' home. While there, Good began to have an increasing dependence on Ativan. One night, while at his parents' house, Good took upwards of 45 Ativan pills and collapsed to the floor. The collapse was heard by his parents and he was rushed to the hospital. During a brief stay in the hospital's psychiatric ward, to which he willfully committed himself, Good was diagnosed with bipolar disorder. The genetic illness was traced back to his mother's side. Recalling past events and stages throughout his life, he has described the diagnosis as a relief, adding "it was like finding the final pieces of the puzzle." Good wrote much of the material for his 2007 release, Hospital Music during his recovery.

In September 2013, Good spoke at the TEDxToronto conference about his creative life and bipolar diagnosis. His presentation was titled "Balancing mental health and genius".

== Discography ==
=== with Matthew Good Band ===
- Last of the Ghetto Astronauts (1995)
- Raygun (1997)
- Underdogs (1997)
- Lo-Fi B-Sides (1998)
- Beautiful Midnight (1999)
- Loser Anthems: B-Sides & Rarities (2001)
- The Audio of Being (2001)

=== Solo ===
- Avalanche (2003)
- White Light Rock & Roll Review (2004)
- In a Coma: 1995–2005 (2005)
- Hospital Music (2007)
- Live at Massey Hall (2008)
- Vancouver (2009)
- Lights of Endangered Species (2011)
- Old Fighters (2013)
- Arrows of Desire (2013)
- Chaotic Neutral (2015)
- I Miss New Wave: Beautiful Midnight Revisited (2016)
- Something Like a Storm (2017)
- Moving Walls (2020)

== Juno Awards ==
- Rock Album of the Year, Vancouver, 2011 Juno Awards (Solo career)
- Video of the Year, Weapon, 2003 Juno Awards (Solo career)
- Best Rock Album of the Year, Beautiful Midnight, 2000 Juno Awards (with Matthew Good Band)
- Best Group of the Year, Matthew Good Band, 2000 Juno Awards (with Matthew Good Band)

Good did not attend any of the ceremonies where he won awards.

== See also ==
- Music of Canada
- List of Canadian musicians
