= Born Losers =

Single by Matthew Good

from the album Hospital Music
- Released: 2007
- Recorded: 2007
- Genre: Alternative rock, folk rock
- Length: 5:21
- Label: Universal
- Songwriter: Matthew Good
- Producer: Matthew Good

Matthew Good singles chronology
"Oh Be Joyful" (2005)	"Born Losers" (2007)	"I'm a Window" (2007)

"Born Losers" is a song by Canadian singer-songwriter Matthew Good. Released as the lead single from Good's third solo album Hospital Music, the song deals with several personal aspects of Good's marriage to his former wife.

== Commercial performance ==
The song was very successful, peaking at #27 on the Canadian Hot 100. The song was also featured as the "Single of the Week" on the American iTunes Store and was downloaded more than 340,000 times while featured as the free download of the week. The video features Noah Cappe and his wife Keri West.

== Charts ==
Chart (2007)	Peak position
Canadian Hot 100	27
Canada Rock (Billboard)	2
