= Underdogs (album) =

1997 studio album by the Matthew Good Band

Studio album by Matthew Good Band
- Released: October 7, 1997
- Recorded: 1997
- Studios: Greenhouse Studios, Burnaby, British Columbia
- Genre: Alternative rock
- Length: 57:27
- Labels: Mercury; Darktown; PolyGram
- Producer: Warne Livesey

Matthew Good Band chronology
| Raygun (EP) (1997) | Underdogs (1997) | Lo-Fi B-Sides (EP) (1998) |

Singles from Underdogs
- 1. "Everything Is Automatic" Released: November 9, 1997; 2. "Indestructible" Released: March 9, 1998; 3. "Apparitions" Released: June 1, 1998; 4. "Rico" Released: 1998

Professional ratings
Review scores
| Source | Rating |
|---|---|
| AllMusic | 3/5 stars |
| Sputnikmusic | 4/5 stars |

Underdogs is the second full-length studio album by the Canadian alternative rock group Matthew Good Band, released in 1997. The album was nominated for "Best Rock Album" at the 1999 Juno Awards. In a 2000 poll by music magazine Chart, Underdogs was voted the 18th Greatest Canadian album of all time.

== Background ==
In December 1996, Matthew Good Band signed a two-album deal with Private Music. In mid-January, on the first day of pre-production for Underdogs, the group was notified that BMG Entertainment North America was merging Private Music into Windham Hill/High Street Records, putting a halt to the production of the album. In mid-March, after negotiations, Windham Hill/High Street released the group from its contract. Good was paid what he was owed for the two albums, and the group decided to record the new album regardless of label support, using the money received from the divorce of their contract with Windham Hill/High Street to fund it. According to Good, the album cost $100,000 to produce. The group then agreed to release the album under a distribution agreement with PolyGram Group Canada.

== Commercial performance ==
Underdogs was the band's most successful album yet. The album was among the top 80 best-selling albums in Canada of 1998, ranking at #76. The album was certified Platinum in Canada in 1999. By March 2003, the album had sold 200,000 units in Canada, achieving Double Platinum status.

== Track listing ==
All words by Matthew Good, all music by Good and Dave Genn, except where noted.

| No. | Title | Length |
|---|---|---|
| 1. | "Deep Six" | 3:32 |
| 2. | "Everything Is Automatic" | 4:17 |
| 3. | "Apparitions" | 5:11 |
| 4. | "My Out of Style Is Coming Back" | 3:16 |
| 5. | "Strangest One of All" | 4:41 |
| 6. | "Middle Class Gangsters" | 5:37 |
| 7. | "Rico" (Good, Genn, Lloyd, Browne) | 3:26 |
| 8. | "Prime Time Deliverance" (Good) | 5:33 |
| 9. | "The Inescapable Us" (Good) | 3:12 |
| 10. | "Indestructible" | 3:24 |
| 11. | "Invasion 1" | 4:04 |
| 12. | "Look Happy, It's the End of the World" | 3:47 |
| 13. | "Change of Season" | 7:21 |

== Personnel ==
- Matthew Good Band
  - Matthew Good - vocals, guitar, cover concept
  - Ian Browne - drums
  - Geoff Lloyd - bass guitar
  - Dave Genn - guitar, Keyboards

Note: Todd Kerns performs backing vocals on "Everything Is Automatic" and "Rico" (not part of MGB)

Production

- Warne Livesey - Producer, Engineer, Mixer
- Frank Weipert - Manager
- Dean Maher - Assistant
- Zach Blackstone - Engineer
- Stephen Marcussen (Precision Mastering, Los Angeles, CA) - Mastering
- Legal: Jonathan Simkin
- Accounting: Davidson & Co.
- Don C. Tyler - Digital editor
- Leanne Petersen - Cover photos
- Andrea Marouk - Additional photos
- Garnet Armstrong - Album design
- Manufacturer: Darktown Records
- Distributor: A&M Records, a division of PolyGram Inc.
