= The Audio of Being =

2001 studio album by the Matthew Good Band

Studio album by Matthew Good Band
- Released: October 30, 2001
- Recorded: October 2000–2001
- Genre: Alternative rock; hard rock
- Length: 63:24
- Label: Universal Music Canada
- Producer: Warne Livesey

Matthew Good Band chronology
Loser Anthems (EP) (2001)	The Audio of Being (2001)	Avalanche (2003)

Singles from The Audio of Being
- 1. "Carmelina" Released: September 2001; 2. "Anti-Pop" Released: February 2002

Professional ratings
Review scores
Source	Rating
AllMusic	3/5 stars
CHARTattack	4.5/5 stars
Sputnikmusic	4.5/5 stars

The Audio Of Being is the fourth and final album by the Canadian rock group Matthew Good Band, released in 2001. It included two singles: "Carmelina" and "Anti-Pop". The album sold 73,000 units in Canada by March 2003 and was certified Gold the same month.

== Recording ==
Matthew Good has stated that the recording process for the album was a "nightmare." He claims it started during the rehearsals of the songs for the album, due to the process being hampered with band members trying to inject ideas into the songs so they could make a case for publishing credits. In addition to that, Good was very ill during much of the recording sessions.

"Anti-Pop" was not originally recorded for the album. After the recording sessions were finished, the band's label requested that the band record another song that could be released as a single. In response, Good wrote "Anti-Pop", which the band then recorded and was later released as the second single from the album. Two songs that were recorded during the sessions were not included on the album. "All Together", which was featured on the original track listing of the album in July 2001, was later removed from the album. "Pony Boy" was also excluded from the album, but was later included on Good's 2005 compilation album, In a Coma.

== Good's opinions ==
Good has claimed to not be thrilled with the end result of the album. In a 2003 interview with Billboard, Good stated that the album was "so far away from what I had envisioned." He later said on his blog that he felt there are some good songs on it (specifically noting "Sort of a Protest Song"). He rearranged songs from The Audio of Being for Rooms, the second disc of In a Coma.

== Special editions ==
Three different packages were released, in black, white and grey. Each included a special booklet with the CD case that had lyrics to all Matthew Good Band songs to date. The words "kept", "in the" or "dark" appeared on the spine of the jewel case depending on the colour, which would line up if all 3 were put together. "Help us get rid of the Matthew Good Band" appears on the hubs of the discs.

== Track listing ==
All tracks written by Matthew Good, except where noted.

No.	Title	Length
1.	"Man of Action"	7:01
2.	"Carmelina"	4:16
3.	"Tripoli" (Good, Genn)	4:39
4.	"Advertising on Police Cars"	7:08
5.	"I, the Throw Away"	3:09
6.	"Truffle Pigs"	4:47
7.	"The Fall of Man" (Good, Genn, Priske, Browne)	5:03
8.	"Under the Influence" (Good, Genn, Priske, Browne)	4:32
9.	"The Rat Who Would Be King"	6:47
10.	"Anti-Pop"	4:08
11.	"The Workers Sing a Song of Mass Production"	5:21
12.	"Sort of a Protest Song"	6:33

== Year-end charts ==
2001 year-end chart performance for The Audio of Being
Chart (2001)	Peak position
Canadian Albums (Nielsen SoundScan)	132

2002 year-end chart performance for The Audio of Being
Chart (2002)	Position
Canadian Alternative Albums (Nielsen SoundScan)	164
