= Loser Anthems =

2001 extended play by the Matthew Good Band

Loser Anthems: B-Sides and Rarities

EP by Matthew Good Band
- Released: June 5, 2001
- Recorded: 1999–2001
- Genre: Alternative rock
- Length: 23:33
- Label: Universal Music Canada

Matthew Good Band chronology
Beautiful Midnight (1999)	Loser Anthems: B-Sides and Rarities (2001)	The Audio of Being (2001)

Singles from Loser Anthems
- 1. "Flashdance II" Released: 2001

Professional ratings
Review scores
Source	Rating
CHARTattack	3.5/5 stars

Loser Anthems: B-Sides and Rarities (normally referred to simply as "Loser Anthems") is a 2001 EP release by the Matthew Good Band. The EP was issued in a limited 35,000 copies. The EP debuted at #6 on the Canadian Albums Chart, selling 11,013 copies in its first week.

== Track listing ==
All tracks written by Matthew Good and Dave Genn.

1. "Flashdance II" – 4:44
2. "The Man from Harold Wood" – 2:17
3. "My Life as a Circus Clown" – 2:46
4. "Intermezzo: M. Good vs. M. Trolley" – 0:36
5. "Flight Recorder from Viking 7" – 5:33
6. "Life Beyond the Minimum Safe Distance" – 3:52
7. "The Fine Art of Falling Apart" – 3:45
