= Matthew Good Band =

Canadian alternative rock band

- Origin: Coquitlam, British Columbia, Canada
- Genres: Alternative rock; hard rock
- Years active: 1995–2002
- Labels: A&M; Mercury; Polygram; Darktown; Universal; Atlantic
- Past members: Matthew Good; Dave Genn; Ian Browne; Rich Priske; Geoff Lloyd

Matthew Good Band was a Canadian alternative rock band formed in Coquitlam, British Columbia in 1995. The band consisted of singer-songwriter/guitarist Matthew Good, guitarist/keyboardist Dave Genn, drummer Ian Browne, and bassist Geoff Lloyd. Lloyd was replaced by Rich Priske in 1998. They became one of the most successful rock bands in Canada during the late 1990s and early 2000s, being nominated for 14 Juno Awards and winning the awards for "Best Group" and "Best Rock Album" (Beautiful Midnight) in 2000. The band broke up after the release of their 2001 album, The Audio of Being.

== History ==
=== 1995–1996: Formation, Last of the Ghetto Astronauts ===
After beginning his music career as a folk musician, Matthew Good formed a three-piece rock band in 1995 composed of himself, drummer Charlie Quintana (later replaced by Ian Browne) and bassist Geoff Lloyd. Dave Genn originally only recorded with the band as a paid session musician. The four recorded the band's debut album, Last of the Ghetto Astronauts. The band released the album independently in 1995, after which Genn officially joined the band. The band was not originally called "Matthew Good Band". In fact, the first 5000 copies of Last of the Ghetto Astronauts were just titled "MGB". After the album was released, "Alabama Motel Room" began to receive significant radio airplay, and people began requesting the song on radio and the album at retail stores calling the band, "Matthew Good Band". At the time, the band had been having conversations about their name, and decided that they would be called "Matthew Good Band". Although initially popular only in the Vancouver area, they received more exposure across Canada in 1996, with the singles "Alabama Motel Room" and "Symbolistic White Walls" becoming significant hits on radio and their music videos being played on MuchMusic. In December 1996, Matthew Good Band signed a two-album deal with Private Music.

=== 1997–1999: Underdogs ===
In mid-January 1997, on the first day of pre-production for their next album, the group was notified that BMG Entertainment North America was merging Private Music into Windham Hill/High Street Records, putting a halt to the production of the album. In mid-March, after negotiations, Windham Hill/High Street released the group from its contract. Good was paid what he was owed for the two albums, and the group then decided to record the new album without label support, using the money received from the divorce of their contract with Windham Hill/High Street to fund it. The group then agreed to release the upcoming album under a distribution agreement with PolyGram Group Canada. After releasing the EP Raygun in May 1997, the band later that year released their second full-length album, Underdogs. The album was produced by Warne Livesey, who would go on to produce every full-length MGB album and most of Good's subsequent solo albums. The album spawned the singles "Everything Is Automatic", "Indestructible", "Apparitions", and "Rico", all of which were hits in Canada.

The band toured across Canada with Edgefest during the summer of 1998. In November 1998, Geoff Lloyd left the band. Lloyd was replaced by Rich Priske shortly after. On January 21, 1999, Underdogs was certified Platinum in Canada.

=== 1999–2000: Beautiful Midnight ===
In July 1999, the band again toured across Canada as a part of Edgefest, this time on the main stage. In September 1999, the band released Beautiful Midnight. The album debuted at #1 on the Canadian Albums Chart and featured the hit singles "Hello Time Bomb", "Load Me Up", and "Strange Days". "Hello Time Bomb" is their highest charting single in the U.S., peaking at 34 on the Billboard Alternative Airplay. In January 2000, Good underwent vocal cord surgery after being diagnosed with sarcoidosis, prompting him to temporarily quit smoking. In March 2000, The band won two Juno awards for "Best Group" and "Best Rock Album". Good himself did not attend the ceremony, and guitarist Dave Genn has been quoted as saying that he only attends for the open bar. Beautiful Midnight became the band's best-selling album, being certified Double Platinum in Canada and selling over 300,000 copies by 2016. In 2000, the band's song "Running for Home" was featured in an episode of Higher Ground.

=== 2000–2001: The Audio of Being ===
In the summer of 2000, Good stayed in a hotel for three weeks in Whistler to work on songs for the new album. Good later wrote that he spent much of the time "trying to keep down food supplement bars, trying to forget the growing tension within the band, the high expectations of needing to produce 'hit songs' (whatever they are these days), throwing up, and trying to find some semblance of direction in my personal life". The band entered the studio in late 2000 to record the material. The sessions saw a great deal of intra-band turmoil. In February 2001, the band began a brief tour of the United States to promote the American release of Beautiful Midnight. In June 2001, the band released the EP Loser Anthems, and followed it with what would be the band's final tour in the summer. In August 2001, Dave Genn quit the band, returning though four days later. The band released The Audio of Being on October 30, 2001.

=== Breakup ===
In November 2001, it was reported that Genn had left the band again and Ian Browne had also left the band. In February 2002, Universal Music Canada confirmed that the band had broken up. In March 2002, during his first interview after the breakup was confirmed, Good stated that the breakup was "a conscious effort on everybody's part". In a 2009 interview for The Ongoing History of New Music, Good stated that he decided the band was done after The Audio of Being was released, citing him no longer wanting to placate the needs of the other band members and no one wanting to tour the new record as reasons.

=== 2002–present: Aftermath ===
Since the breakup of Matthew Good Band, Good has pursued a successful solo career, with Priske continuing as Good's bassist until 2005. Genn has been a member of the Canadian rock group 54-40 since 2003 and has written and produced songs for several artists. Geoff Lloyd died in January 2010. Good briefly reunited with Browne in 2011, with Browne drumming for Good on his Lights of Endangered Species tour. Rich Priske died on July 11, 2020.

== Members ==
- Matthew Good – lead vocals, rhythm guitar (1995–2002)
- Rich Priske – bass guitar (1998–2002)
- Ian Browne – drums (1995–2001)
- Dave Genn – lead guitar, keyboards (1995–2001)
- Geoff Lloyd – bass guitar (1995–1998)

== Discography ==
- Last of the Ghetto Astronauts (1995)
- Raygun (1997)
- Underdogs (1997)
- Lo-Fi B-Sides (1998)
- Beautiful Midnight (1999)
- Loser Anthems: B-Sides & Rarities (2001)
- The Audio of Being (2001)

== See also ==
- Canadian rock
- Music of Canada
