= Warne Livesey =

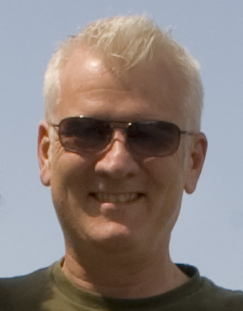
- Livesey in 2012

Background information
- Born: 12 February 1959 (age 67); London, England
- Genres: Alternative rock; pop rock; pop
- Occupations: Producer; mixer; songwriter
- Years active: 1980–present
- Website: warnelivesey.com

Warne Livesey (born 12 February 1959) is a British/Canadian music producer, mixing engineer, songwriter and musician. His career highlights include producing Midnight Oil, The The, Matthew Good Band, and Deacon Blue.

== Life and career ==
Warne Livesey started his career in London, England as a musician and sound engineer, working with producers like David Lord and Rhett Davies. This led to early production work during London's expanding independent music scene in the early 1980s. In 1986, he teamed up with Matt Johnson to work on his The The album Infected. Livesey worked closely with Johnson on the record also contributing on bass and keyboards as well as arranging for strings. The album sold more than a million copies worldwide. He also worked on the follow-up album Mind Bomb in 1989. He produced Saint Julian (1987) by Julian Cope before going to Australia to work with Midnight Oil on their album Diesel and Dust, released in the same year. The record sold five million copies worldwide and in 2010 was named the best Australian album of all time. The opening track, "Beds Are Burning", was an international hit and is included in the Rock and Roll Hall of Fame's 500 songs that shaped Rock and Roll. Livesey went on to produce five more records with the band; Blue Sky Mining (1990), Redneck Wonderland (1998), Capricornia (2001), The Makarrata Project (2020), and their last album Resist (2022).

During the 1990s he also produced: Paul Young, Jesus Jones, the Big Dish and House of Love, whose album Babe Rainbow (1992) he also co-wrote songs for. He also collaborated with Talk Talk frontman Mark Hollis, co-writing most of the songs on his only solo album.

== Relocation to Canada ==
In 1997 Livesey starting working with Canadian alternative rock artist the Matthew Good Band on their second album Underdogs. He produced the band's next two albums including Beautiful Midnight (1999). After the band broke up in 2002 Livesey continued working with Matthew Good and to date has produced seven of his solo records, including Lights of Endangered Species (2011), Chaotic Neutral (2015), Something Like a Storm (2017), and finally Moving Walls (2020).

Livesey now lives and works out of Toronto.

== Discography ==
producer [p], mixer [m], engineer [e], songwriter [s]

- 2025: 54-40 (Porto) [p,m,e]
- 2024: The The (Ensoulment) [p,m,e]
- 2022: The House of Love (A State of Grace) [m]
- 2022: Midnight Oil (Resist) [p,m,e]
- 2020: Midnight Oil (The Makarrata Project) [p,m,e]
- 2020: Matthew Good (Moving Walls) [p,m,e]
- 2019: Headstones (People Skills) [m]
- 2019: The Small Glories (Assiniboine & the Red) [m,p]
- 2017: Matthew Good (Something Like a Storm) [p,m,e,s]
- 2017: Kim Churchill (Breakneck Speed) [p,e,s]
- 2016: Rykka (Beatitudes) [p,m,e,s]
- 2016: Matthew Good (I Miss New Wave: Beautiful Midnight Revisited EP) [p,m,e]
- 2015: Matthew Good (Chaotic Neutral) [p,m,e]
- 2015: Rykka (The Last of Our Kind) [p,m,e,s]
- 2014: Crystal Shawanda (The Whole World's Got the Blues) [m]
- 2014: Kim Churchill (Silence/Win) [p,m,e,s]
- 2013: Paul Young (Remixes & Rarities) [p]
- 2013: Rykka (Kodiak) [m]
- 2013: No Sinner (Boo Hoo Hoo) [p,m,e]
- 2013: Kandle (In Flames) [m]
- 2012: Midnight Oil (Essential Oils) [p,m,e]
- 2012: The Dudes (Barbers, Thieves and Bartenders) [m]
- 2011: Matthew Good (Lights of Endangered Species) [p,m,e]
- 2010: Xavier Rudd (Koonyum Sun) [m]
- 2009: Acres of Lions (Working) [m]
- 2008: Chris Walla (Field Manual) [p,m,e]
- 2008: 54-40 (Northern Soul) [m]
- 2007: Armchair Cynics (Killing the Romance) [m]
- 2007: Cara Luft (The Light Fantastic) [m]
- 2007: In-Flight Safety (Coast Is Clear) [p,m,e]
- 2006: Jets Overhead (Bridges) [m]
- 2006: Paul Young (Collections) [p]
- 2006: Deacon Blue (Singles) [p,e]
- 2005: Sinéad O'Connor (Collaborations) [p,m,e]
- 2005: Matthew Good (In a Coma: The Best of Matthew Good 1995–2005) [p,m,e]
- 2005: Mick Stevens (The River / The Englishman) [p]
- 2005: 54-40 (Yes to Everything) [p,m,e]
- 2004: Matthew Good (White Light Rock & Roll Review) [p,m,e]
- 2004: Mick Stevens (See the Morning / No Savage Word) [p]
- 2004: In-Flight Safety (Vacation Land) [m]
- 2003: Matthew Good (Avalanche) [p,m,e]
- 2003: 54-40 (Goodbye Flatland) [m]
- 2003: Holly McNarland (Home Is Where My Feet Are) [p,m,e]
- 2003: Icehouse (Measure for Measure / Primitive Man) [m,e]
- 2003: Paul Young (Love Songs) [p]
- 2002: The The (45 RPM: The Singles of The The) [p,m,e]
- 2002: Midnight Oil (Capricornia) [p,m,e]
- 2002: The The (London Town 1983–1993) [p,m,e]
- 2001: Matthew Good Band (Audio of Being) [p,m,e]
- 2000: Sarah Cracknell (Kelly's Locker) [p,m,e]
- 2000: Deacon Blue (Our Town: The Greatest Hits) [p,e]
- 2000: Hooverphonic (The Magnificent Tree) [p,m,e]
- 1999: The Creatures (Anima Animus) [p,m,e]
- 1999: Matthew Good Band (Beautiful Midnight) [p,m,e]
- 1999: Julian Cope (Leper Skin: An Introduction to Julian Cope) [p,m,e]
- 1998: The House of Love (Best Of) [p,s]
- 1998: Mark Hollis (Mark Hollis) [s]
- 1998: Emm Gryner (Public) [p,m,e]
- 1998: Midnight Oil (Redneck Wonderland) [p,m,e]
- 1998: All About Eve (Winter Words: Hits & Rarities) [p,m,e]
- 1997: Midnight Oil (20,000 Watt RSL: Greatest Hits) [p,m]
- 1997: Jesus Jones (Chemical # 1) [p,m]
- 1997: Sarah Cracknell (Lipslide) [p,m,e]
- 1997: Jesus Jones (Next Big Thing) [p,m]
- 1997: Julian Cope (The Followers of Saint Julian) [p,m]
- 1997: Matthew Good Band (Underdogs) [p,m,e]
- 1996: Ghostwriters (Second Skin) [m]
- 1995: Whipping Boy (Heartworm) [p]
- 1995: Prick (Prick) [p]
- 1995: Suddenly, Tammy! (We Get There When We Do) [p,m,e]
- 1993: Jesus Jones (Perverse) [p,m]
- 1992: The House of Love (Babe Rainbow) [p,s]
- 1991: Paul Young (From Time to Time: The Singles Collection) [p]
- 1991: The Big Dish (Satellites) [p,m]
- 1991: All About Eve (Touched by Jesus) [p,m]
- 1990: Midnight Oil (Blue Sky Mining) [p,m]
- 1990: Paul Young (Other Voices) [p]
- 1989: The The (Mind Bomb) [p,m,e]
- 1989: Deacon Blue (When the World Knows Your Name) [p,e]
- 1988: Midnight Oil (Diesel and Dust) [p,m]
- 1987: Julian Cope (Saint Julian) [p,m]
- 1987: How We Live (Dry Land) [p,m,e]
- 1987: Colin Hay (Looking For Jack) [m]
- 1986: The The (Infected) [p,m,e]
- 1986: Icehouse (Measure for Measure) [m,e]
- 1985: Scraping Foetus off the Wheel (Nail) [p,m,e]
- 1985: Coil (Panic/Tainted Love) [m,e]
- 1985: Thomas Dolby (May the Cube Be With You) [m]
- 1985: Martha and the Muffins (The World Is a Ball) [m,e]
- 1984: Scraping Foetus off the Wheel (Hole) [p,m,e]
- 1984: Coil (Scatology) [m,e]
- 1984: The Europeans (Recurring Dreams) [m,e]
- 1984: The Specials (In the Studio) [m,e]
- 1983: The Higsons (The Curse of the Higsons) [p,m,e]
- 1982: The Apollinaires (Envy The Love) [p,e]

== Awards ==
- WCM Award for Outstanding Producer 2003.
- Juno Award for Best Rock Album: Beautiful Midnight, Matthew Good Band
- ARIA Award for Single of the Year 1988: Beds Are Burning, Midnight Oil.
- ARIA Award for Album of the Year 1991: Blue Sky Mining, Midnight Oil.

== Bibliography ==
- Beds Are Burning: Midnight Oil, The Journey. Mark Dobshon. Penguin Books. 2005. ISBN 0143003674 ISBN 978-0143003670
