= Dave Genn =

Canadian musician

- Born: March 2, 1969 (age 56)
- Origin: Canada
- Occupation(s): Musician, Producer, and Songwriter

David Robert Madison Genn (born March 2, 1969) is a Canadian musician, producer, and songwriter. He is a member of the rock group 54-40, and a former member of the Matthew Good Band.

== Early life ==
Genn was born in Vancouver, British Columbia, on March 2, 1969. He is the son of artist Robert Genn, and the brother of film and television director James Genn.

== Career ==
=== Dead Surf Kiss (DSK) ===
Dave Genn was a member of Vancouver psychedelic, punk, hard rock, band Dead Surf Kiss, named after their love of The Grateful Dead, Surf music, and KISS. They had several releases, the first of which was titled "Narcotic Nevada" via Vancouver label "Onslot Music" in 1991. The album was produced by Dave Ogilvie (Skinny Puppy) and Dan Tanna. "Onslot Music" later signed a sub-distro deal in the US with BMG Music. They played shows at Vancouver's Town Pump Cabaret. DSK was the opening act for BMG label-mates TOOL on their North American tour, in the early 1990s.

=== Matthew Good Band ===
Genn spent six years with the Matthew Good Band between 1995 and 2001 when he served as the band's lead guitarist and keyboardist, co-writing many of the band's songs with Matthew Good.

=== 54-40 ===
Genn joined the band 54-40 in 2003. As of 2019, he continues to tour and record with the group.

== Personal life ==
In February 2006, Genn married local CTV Vancouver news anchor and television personality Tamara Taggart. Genn has a son and two daughters.
