= 123rd Ohio General Assembly =

The 123rd Ohio General Assembly was the legislative body of the state of Ohio in 1999 and 2000. In this General Assembly, both the Ohio Senate and the Ohio House of Representatives were controlled by the Republican Party. In the Senate, there were 21 Republicans and 12 Democrats. In the House, there were 59 Republicans and 40 Democrats.

== New Members of the Senate ==
District	Previous Senator	Reason for change	New Senator	Date
1st	M. Ben Gaeth (R)	Gaeth retired. Wachtmann elected with 61% of the vote.	Lynn Wachtmann (R)	January 3, 1999
9th	Janet C. Howard (R)	Howard defeated by Mark Mallory 59% to 41% in 1998 general election.	Mark Mallory (D)	January 3, 1999
13th	Alan Zaleski (D)	Zaleski retired. Armbruster elected with 47% of the vote.	Jeff Armbruster (R)	January 3, 1999
21st	Jeff Johnson (D)	Johnson retired. Prentiss elected with 86% of the vote.	C.J. Prentiss (D)	January 3, 1999
23rd	Patrick Sweeney (D)	Sweeney retired. Brady elected unopposed.	Dan Brady (D)	January 3, 1999
25th	Judy Sheerer (D)	Sheerer retired. Fingerhut elected with 80% of the vote.	Eric Fingerhut (D)	January 3, 1999
24th	Gary C. Suhadolnik (R)	Suhadolnik resigns to become a member of Governor Bob Taft's cabinet. Spada appointed.	Bob Spada (R)	February 2, 1999
19th	Richard Schafrath (R)	Schafrath resigns to become a lobbyist. Harris appointed.	Bill Harris (R)	August 15, 2000

=== Vacancies ===
- January 5, 1999: Representative Tom Johnson (R-96th) resigns to become a member of the Cabinet of Governor Bob Taft.
- March 1, 1999: Representative Ross Boggs (D-5th) resigns.
- May 30, 1999: Representative Otto Beatty Jr. resigns.
- June 30, 1999: Representative Joy Padgett (R-95th) resigns.
- August 9, 1999: Representative Ed Core (R-87th) died.
- August 10, 1999: Representative Darrell Opfer (D-53rd) resigns to become Economic Development Director of Ottawa County.
- September 14, 1999: Representative Sally Perz (D-52nd) resigns to take a position with the University of Toledo.
- November 4, 1999: Representative E. J. Thomas (D-27th) resigns to take a job in the private sector.
- November 4, 1999: Representative Joe Haines (R-74th) resigns to work in the Ohio Department of Agriculture.
- December 31, 1999: Representative Johnnie Maier (D-56th) resigns to become Clerk of the Massillon Municipal Court.
- August 15, 2000: Representative Bill Harris (R-93rd) resigns to take a seat in the Ohio Senate.
- September 12, 2000: Representative David Robinson (R-27th) resigns.

=== Appointments ===
- January 5, 1999: Michael G. Verich is appointed to House District 66.
- January 5, 1999: Nancy P. Hollister is appointed to House District 96.
- March 1, 1999: George Distel is appointed to House District 5.
- May 31, 1999; Joyce Beatty is appointed.
- June 30, 1999: Jim Aslanides is appointed to House District 95.
- September 8, 1999: Tony Core is appointed to House District 87.
- September 8, 1999: Chris Redfern is appointed to House District 53.
- October 20, 1999: Jim Mettler appointed to House District 52.
- December 8, 1999: David J. Robinson appointed to House District 27.
- December 8, 1999: Chris Widener appointed to House District 74.
- January 11, 2000: Mike Stevens appointed to House District 56.
- September 12, 2000: Thom Collier is appointed to House District 93.
- September 13, 2000: Jim Hughes is appointed to House District 27.

== Senate ==
=== Leadership ===
==== Majority leadership ====
- President of the Senate: Richard Finan
- President pro tempore of the Senate: Robert Cupp
- Assistant pro tempore: Bruce E. Johnson
- Whip: Merle G. Kearns

==== Minority leadership ====
- Leader: Ben Espy
- Assistant Leader: Leigh Herington
- Whip: Rhine McLin
- Assistant Whip: Dan Brady

=== Members of the 123rd Ohio Senate ===
District	Senator	Party	First elected
1	Lynn Wachtmann	Republican	1998
2	Bob Latta	Republican	1996
3	Bruce E. Johnson	Republican	1994 (Appt.)
4	Scott Nein	Republican	1995 (Appt.)
5	Rhine McLin	Democratic	1994
6	Chuck Horn	Republican	1984
7	Richard Finan	Republican	1978 (Appt.)
8	Lou Blessing	Republican	1996
9	Mark Mallory	Democratic	1998
10	Merle G. Kearns	Republican	1991 (Appt.)
11	Linda J. Furney	Democratic	1986
12	Robert R. Cupp	Republican	1984
13	Jeff Armbruster	Republican	1998
14	Doug White	Republican	1996 (Appt.)
15	Ben Espy	Democratic	1992 (Appt.)
16	Eugene J. Watts	Republican	1984
17	Michael Shoemaker	Democratic	1997 (Appt.)
18	Robert A. Gardner	Republican	1996
19	Bill Harris	Republican	2000 (Appt.)
20	James E. Carnes	Republican	1995 (Appt.)
21	C.J. Prentiss	Democratic	1998
22	Grace L. Drake	Republican	1984 (Appt.)
23	Dan Brady	Democratic	1998
24	Robert Spada	Republican	1999 (Appt.)
25	Eric Fingerhut	Democratic	1998
26	Larry Mumper	Republican	1997 (Appt.)
27	Roy Ray	Republican	1986
28	Leigh Herington	Democratic	1995 (Appt.)
29	Scott Oelslager	Republican	1985 (Appt.)
30	Gregory L. DiDonato	Democratic	1996
31	Jay Hottinger	Republican	1998 (Appt.)
32	Anthony Latell Jr.	Democratic	1992
33	Bob Hagan	Democratic	1997 (Appt.)

== House of Representatives ==
=== Leadership ===
==== Majority leadership ====
- Speaker of the House: Jo Ann Davidson
- President pro tempore of the Senate: Randy Gardner
- Floor Leader: Pat Tiberi
- Assistant Majority Floor Leader: Jim Buchy
- Majority Whip: Bill Harris
- Assistant Majority Whip: Larry Householder

==== Minority leadership ====
- Leader: Jack Ford
- Assistant Leader: Barbara C. Pringle
- Whip: Dan Metelsky
- Assistant Whip: Charlie Wilson

=== Members of the 123rd Ohio House of Representatives ===
District	Representative	Party	First elected
1	John R. Willamowski	Republican	1997 (Appt.)
2	George E. Terwilleger	Republican	1992
3	Sean D. Logan	Democratic	1990 (Appt.)
4	Randy Gardner	Republican	1985 (Appt.)
5	George Distel	Democratic	1999 (Appt.)
6	Jon D. Myers	Republican	1990
7	Ron Amstutz	Republican	1980
8	Shirley Smith	Democratic	1998
9	Barbara Boyd	Democratic	1992
10	Troy Lee James	Democratic	1967
11	Peter Lawson Jones	Democratic	1996
12	John E. Barnes Jr.	Democratic	1998
13	Barbara C. Pringle	Democratic	1982 (Appt.)
14	Ed Jerse	Democratic	1995 (Appt.)
15	Jim Trakas	Republican	1998
16	Sally Conway Kilbane	Republican	1998
17	Bryan Flannery	Democratic	1998
18	Erin Sullivan	Democratic	1998 (Appt.)
19	Dale Miller	Democratic	1996
20	Dean DePiero	Democratic	
21	Joyce Beatty	Democratic	1999 (Appt.)
22	Ray Miller	Democratic	1998
23	Amy Salerno	Republican	1994
24	Jo Ann Davidson	Republican	1980
25	David Goodman	Republican	1998 (Appt.)
26	Patrick Tiberi	Republican	
27	Jim Hughes	Republican	2000 (Appt.)
28	Geoffrey C. Smith	Republican	1998
29	Larry Wolpert	Republican	
30	Samuel T. Britton	Democratic	1994
31	Catherine L. Barrett	Democratic	1998
32	Dale N. Van Vyven	Republican	1978 (Appt.)
33	Jerome F. Luebbers	Democratic	1978
34	Cheryl Winkler	Republican	1990 (Appt.)
35	Patricia Clancy	Republican	1996
36	Bob Schuler	Republican	1992
37	Jacquelyn K. O'Brien	Republican	1986
38	Dixie Allen	Democratic	1998 (Appt.)
39	Tom Roberts	Democratic	1986 (Appt.)
40	Jeff Jacobson	Republican	
41	Don Mottley	Republican	1992
42	Bob Corbin	Republican	1976
43	Bob Netzley	Republican	1967
44	Vernon Sykes	Democratic	1983 (Appt.)
45	Bryan C. Williams	Republican	1996
46	Kevin Coughlin	Republican	1996
47	Betty Sutton	Democratic	
48	Twyla Roman	Republican	1994
49	Jack Ford	Democratic	1994
50	Jeanine Perry	Democratic	1998
51	Lynn Olman	Republican	1995 (Appt.)
52	Jim Mettler	Republican	1999 (Appt.)
53	Chris Redfern	Democratic	1999 (Appt.)
54	William J. Healy	Democratic	1974
55	Kirk Schuring	Republican	1994
56	Mike Stevens	Democratic	2000 (Appt.)
57	Ron Hood	Republican	1994
58	Gary Cates	Republican	1995 (Appt.)
59	Greg Jolivette	Republican	1997 (Appt.)
60	Gene Krebs	Republican	
61	Dan Metelsky	Democratic	1996 (Appt.)
62	John Bender	Democratic	1992
63	Bill Taylor	Republican	1994
64	Sylvester Patton	Democratic	1997 (Appt.)
65	Ron Gerberry	Democratic	1974
66	Michael G. Verich	Democratic	1999 (Appt.)
67	June Lucas	Democratic	1986
68	Diane Grendell	Republican	1992
69	Ron Young	Republican	
70	Jamie Callender	Republican	1996
71	Sam Bateman	Republican	
72	Rose Vesper	Republican	
73	Ron Rhine	Democratic	
74	Chris Widener	Republican	1999 (Appt.)
75	Ann H. Womer Benjamin	Republican	1994
76	Steve Austria	Republican	1998
77	David R. Evans	Republican	1998 (Appt.)
78	Larry Householder	Republican	1996
79	William J. Hartnett	Democratic	1998 (Appt.)
80	Joan Lawrence	Republican	1982
81	Chuck Calvert	Republican	1998
82	Steve Buehrer	Republican	1998
83	Jim Hoops	Republican	1998
84	Jim Buchy	Republican	
85	Jim Jordan	Republican	1994
86	Chuck Brading	Republican	
87	Tony Core	Republican	1999 (Appt.)
88	Dennis Stapleton	Republican	1996 (Appt.)
89	Rex Damschroder	Republican	1994
90	Randy Weston	Democratic	1990
91	Joseph P. Sulzer	Democratic	1997 (Appt.)
92	William L. Ogg	Democratic	1994
93	Thom Collier	Republican	2000 (Appt.)
94	John Carey	Republican	1994
95	Jim Aslanides	Republican	1999 (Appt.)
96	Nancy P. Hollister	Republican	1999 (Appt.)
97	Kerry R. Metzger	Republican	1994
98	Jerry W. Krupinski	Democratic	1986
99	Charlie Wilson	Democratic	1996

Appt.- Member was appointed to current House Seat

== See also ==
- Ohio House of Representatives membership, 126th General Assembly
- Ohio House of Representatives membership, 125th General Assembly
