= Ohio's 16th senatorial district =

American legislative district

Ohio's 16th State Senate district
Senator
Beth Liston; D–Dublin
- Demographics: 73.1% White; 9.8% Black; 4.7% Hispanic; 10.6% Asian; 1.6% Native American; 0.1% Hawaiian/Pacific Islander
- Population (2020) • Voting age • Citizens of voting age: 359,373; 278,581; 250,609

After the 2023 redistricting, Ohio's 16th senatorial district is made up of the north western and North eastern sections of the metropolitan Columbus area in Franklin County. It currently includes the Ohio House Districts 4 8 and 11.

The current Ohio Senator is Democrat Beth Liston.

== Historically ==
Before the 2023 redistricting, Ohio's 16th senatorial district had always consisted of portions of the greater Columbus, Ohio area, and is now made up of the western portion of Franklin County. It encompasses Ohio House districts 21, 23 and 24. It has a Cook PVI of D+7.

== List of senators ==
Senator	Party	Term	Notes
Bob Shaw	Republican	January 3, 1953 – December 31, 1972	Shaw did not seek re-election in 1972.
Donald L. Woodland	Democrat	January 3, 1973 – December 31, 1976	Woodland lost the party nomination in 1976 to Michael Schwarzwalder.
Michael Schwarzwalder	Democrat	January 3, 1977 – December 31, 1984	Schawrzwalder lost re-election in 1984 to Eugene J. Watts.
Eugene J. Watts	Republican	January 3, 1985 – December 31, 2000	Watts was term-limited in 2000.
Priscilla D. Mead	Republican	January 3, 2001 – December 31, 2002	Mead resigned prior to the expiration of her term in 2004.
Steve Stivers	Republican	January 6, 2003 – December 31, 2008	Stivers did not seek re-election in 2008 to run for the United States Congress.
Jim Hughes	Republican	January 5, 2009 – December 31, 2016	Hughes was term-limited in 2016.
Stephanie Kunze	Republican	January 3, 2017 – January 3, 2025	Kunze was term-limited in 2024.
Beth Liston	Democrat	January 3, 2025 – present	Incumbent
