= Michael Stevens =

Michael or Mike Stevens may refer to:

== Music ==
- Meic Stevens (Louis Michael James Stevens, born 1942), Welsh singer-songwriter
- Michael Jefry Stevens (born 1951), American jazz pianist
- Mick Stevens (1953–1987), English guitarist, singer, and songwriter
- Mike Stevens (saxophonist) (born 1957), British musician and musical director
- Michael Stevens (composer) (born 1967), American jazz composer and musician
- Mike Stevens (harmonica player), Canadian harmonica player

== Other entertainment ==
- Michael Fenton Stevens (born 1958), British actor and comedian
- Michael Stevens (producer) (1966–2015), American television producer, director, and writer
- Michael Stevens (educator) (born 1986), American host of the YouTube channel Vsauce
- Mike Stevens (Brookside), fictional character in the British soap Brookside

== Politics ==
- Mike Stevens (Ohio politician), member of the Ohio House of Representatives
- Mike Stevens (South Dakota politician) (born 1953), member of the South Dakota House of Representatives

== Sports ==
- Mike Stevens (ice hockey, born 1950), ice hockey player who played in the World Hockey Association
- Mike Stevens (ice hockey, born 1965), ice hockey player who played in the National Hockey League
- Michael Stevens (footballer) (born 1980), former Australian rules footballer
- Michael Gary Stevens (born 1963), English footballer and physiotherapist

== Others ==
- Sir Michael Stevens (accountant) (born 1958), British accountant and courtier
- Michael D. Stevens (born 1964), Master Chief Petty Officer of the U.S. Navy

== See also ==
- Michael Stephens (disambiguation)
- Steven Michaels (born 1987), Australian professional rugby league footballer
