= 2014 Ohio elections =

Ohio elections, 2014
- 2014

The Ohio general elections, 2014 were held on November 4, 2014, throughout Ohio, with polls opened between 6:30AM and 7:30PM. The close of registration for electors in the primary election was April 7, 2014, and the primary election day took place on May 6, 2014.

== Early voting ==
During the week of November 18, 2013, Republicans in the state legislature planned to introduce four bills that would restrict voting in the 2014 elections, including shortening the early voting period from 35 to 29 days.

== Federal representatives ==
=== United States Senate ===
There was no U.S. Senate election in Ohio in 2014. Republican senator Rob Portman is a Class III senator who ran for and won re-election in 2016. Democratic senator Sherrod Brown is a Class I senator who ran for and won re-election in 2018.

=== United States House of Representatives ===
All of Ohio's 16 seats in the United States House of Representatives were up for election in 2014.

== State executive branch ==
=== Governor and lieutenant governor ===
Incumbent Republican governor John Kasich and lieutenant governor Mary Taylor ran for re-election to a second term in office.

Ed FitzGerald, the County Executive of Cuyahoga County, Ohio, was the Democratic nominee. His running mate was attorney and former Congressional nominee Sharen Neuhardt.

Anita Rios ran as the Green Party candidate. Her running mate was Bob Fitrakis.

Governor John Kasich and his running mate Lieutenant Governor Mary Taylor were re-elected with 64% of the vote.

=== Attorney general ===
Incumbent Republican Attorney General Mike DeWine ran for re-election to a second term in office.

Former Cincinnati City Councilman and former Hamilton County Commissioner David A. Pepper ran for the Democrats.

=== Secretary of state ===
Incumbent Republican Secretary of State Jon Husted ran for re-election to a second term in office.

State Senator Nina Turner ran for the Democrats.

Libertarian Kevin Knedler also ran.

=== Treasurer ===
2014 Ohio State Treasurer election
- November 4, 2014
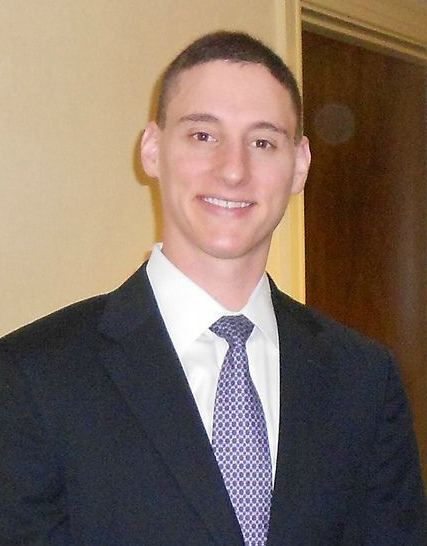

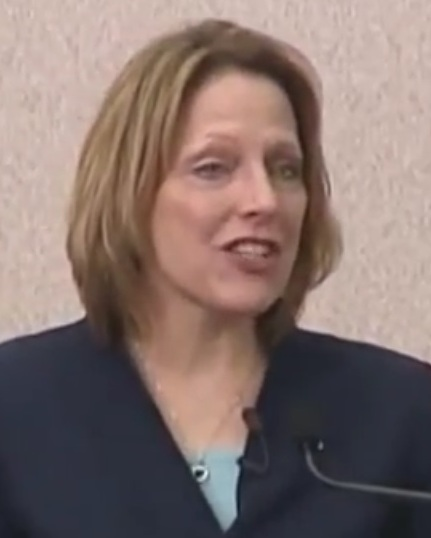
Nominee	Josh Mandel	Connie Pillich
Party	Republican	Democratic
Popular vote	1,724,060	1,323,325
Percentage	56.58%	43.42%
- County results Mandel: 50-60% 60-70% 70-80% 80-90% Pillich: 50–60% 60–70%
State Treasurer before election
Josh Mandel
Republican
Elected State Treasurer
Josh Mandel
Republican

Incumbent Republican State Treasurer Josh Mandel ran for re-election to a second term in office.

State Representative Connie Pillich ran for the Democrats.

==== General election ====
===== Polling =====
Poll source	Date(s) administered	Sample size	Margin of error	Josh Mandel (R)	Connie Pillich (D)	Undecided
The Columbus Dispatch	October 22–31, 2014	1,009	± 3.3%	53%	47%	—
The Columbus Dispatch	September 3–12, 2014	1,185	± 2.7%	47%	41%	11%
Buckeye Poll	August 31, 2014	600	± 4%	34%	25%	41%
Public Policy Polling	August 8–9, 2014	801 LV	± 3.5%	44%	47%	9%
Public Policy Polling	July 9–10, 2014	889 RV	± 3.3%	43%	46%	11%
Public Policy Polling	November 5–6, 2013	595 RV	± 4%	43%	47%	10%
Public Policy Polling	August 16–19, 2013	551 RV	± 4.2%	35%	40%	24%

===== Results =====
Ohio State Treasurer election, 2014
Party	Candidate	Votes	%
Republican	Josh Mandel (incumbent)	1,724,060	56.58%
Democratic	Connie Pillich	1,323,325	43.42%
Total votes		3,047,385	100.00%
Republican hold			

=== Auditor ===
2014 Ohio State Auditor election
- November 4, 2014
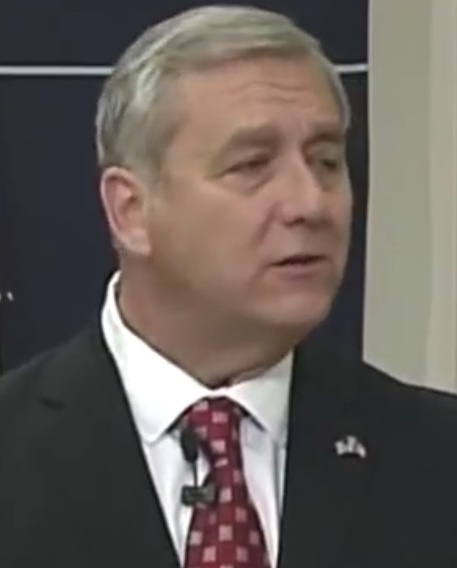

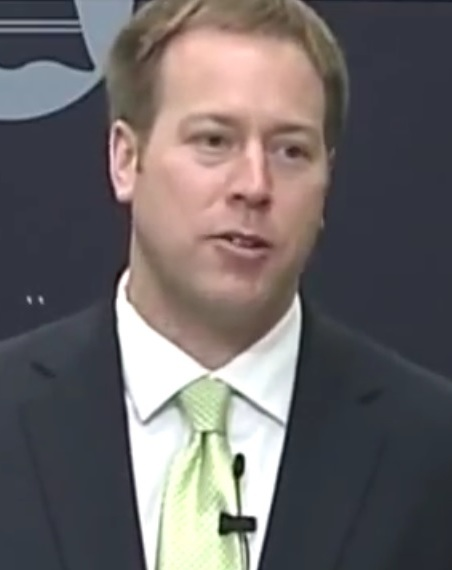
Nominee	Dave Yost	John Patrick Carney
Party	Republican	Democratic
Popular vote	1,711,927	1,149,305
Percentage	56.98%	38.25%
- County results Yost: 40-50% 50-60% 60-70% 70-80% Carney: 50–60%
State Auditor before election
Dave Yost
Republican
Elected State Auditor
Dave Yost
Republican

Incumbent Republican State Auditor Dave Yost ran for re-election to a second term in office.

State Representative John Patrick Carney ran for the Democrats.

Libertarian Bob Bridges also ran.

==== General election ====
===== Polling =====
Poll source	Date(s) administered	Sample size	Margin of error	David Yost (R)	John Patrick Carney (D)	Bob Bridges (L)	Undecided
The Columbus Dispatch	October 22–31, 2014	1,009	± 3.3%	55%	39%	—	6%
The Columbus Dispatch	September 3–12, 2014	1,185	± 2.7%	45%	33%	5%	16%
Buckeye Poll	August 31, 2014	600	± 4%	26%	22%	—	52%
Public Policy Polling	August 8–9, 2014	801 LV	± 3.5%	44%	42%	—	14%
Public Policy Polling	July 9–10, 2014	889 RV	± 3.3%	42%	40%	—	17%

===== Results =====
Ohio State Auditor election, 2014
Party	Candidate	Votes	%
Republican	Dave Yost (incumbent)	1,711,927	56.98%
Democratic	John Patrick Carney	1,149,305	38.25%
Libertarian	Bob Bridges	143,363	4.77%
Total votes		3,004,595	100.00%
Republican hold			

== State legislative branch ==
=== Ohio Senate ===
The 17 odd-numbered districts out of 33 seats in the Ohio Senate were up for election in 2014. Ten of these seats were held by Republicans and seven were held by Democrats. Republicans controlled the chamber with a 23 to 10 majority.

=== Ohio House of Representatives ===
All 99 seats in the Ohio House of Representatives were up for election in 2014. Republicans held 59 seats and Democrats held 40 seats.

== Supreme Court of Ohio ==
2014 Ohio Supreme Court elections
- November 4, 2014

2 seats of the Supreme Court of Ohio
	Majority party	Minority party
Party	Republican	Democratic
Last election	6	1
Seats won	2	0
Seat change	Steady	Steady

While judicial races in Ohio are technically non-partisan (party affiliations are not listed on the ballot), candidates run in party primaries. Terms are six years, and justices may run for re-election an unlimited number of times before their 70th birthday. The Supreme Court currently consists of 6 Republicans and 1 Democrat.

=== Associate justice (term commencing 01/01/2015) ===
Incumbent justice Sharon L. Kennedy (R) was eligible to run for another 6-year term.

==== Republican primary ====
===== Candidates =====
- Sharon L. Kennedy, incumbent Associate Justice of the Supreme Court of Ohio

===== Results =====
Republican primary results
Party	Candidate	Votes	%
Republican	Sharon L. Kennedy (incumbent)	466,278	100.0%
Total votes		466,278	100.0%

==== Democratic primary ====
===== Candidates =====
- Tom Letson, state representative

===== Results =====
Democratic primary results
Party	Candidate	Votes	%
Democratic	Tom Letson	327,590	100.0%
Total votes		327,590	100.0%

==== General election ====
===== Polling =====
Poll source	Date(s) administered	Sample size	Margin of error	Sharon L. Kennedy (R)	Tom Letson (D)	Undecided
The Columbus Dispatch	October 22–31, 2014	1,009 (LV)	± 3.3%	75%	25%	—
The Columbus Dispatch	September 3–12, 2014	1,185 (LV)	± 2.7%	32%	11%	57%

===== Results =====
2014 Ohio Supreme Court Associate Justice (Term commencing 01/01/2015) election
Party	Candidate	Votes	%
Nonpartisan	Sharon L. Kennedy (incumbent)	1,828,156	72.54%
Nonpartisan	Tom Letson	692,030	27.46%
Total votes		2,520,186	100.0%
Republican hold			

=== Associate justice (term commencing 01/02/2015) ===
2014 Ohio Supreme Court election (French seat)
- November 4, 2014
Nominee	Judith L. French	John O'Donnell
Party	Nonpartisan	Nonpartisan
Alliance	Republican	Democratic
Popular vote	1,438,283	1,132,759
Percentage	55.9%	44.1%
- County results French: 50–60% 60–70% O'Donnell: 50–60%
Justice before election
Judith L. French
Republican
Elected Justice
Judith L. French
Republican

Incumbent justice Judith L. French (R) was eligible to run for another 6-year term.

==== Republican primary ====
===== Candidates =====
- Judith L. French, incumbent associate justice of the Supreme Court of Ohio

===== Results =====
Republican primary results
Party	Candidate	Votes	%
Republican	Judith L. French (incumbent)	441,733	100.0%
Total votes		441,733	100.0%

==== Democratic primary ====
===== Candidates =====
- John P. O'Donnell, Cuyahoga County Court of Common Pleas judge

===== Results =====
Democratic primary results
Party	Candidate	Votes	%
Democratic	John P. O'Donnell	349,909	100.0%
Total votes		349,909	100.0%

==== General election ====
===== Polling =====
Poll source	Date(s) administered	Sample size	Margin of error	Judith L. French (R)	John P. O'Donnell (D)	Undecided
The Columbus Dispatch	October 22–31, 2014	1,009 (LV)	± 3.3%	56%	44%	—
The Columbus Dispatch	September 3–12, 2014	1,185 (LV)	± 2.7%	20%	26%	54%
Public Policy Polling	April 14–15, 2014	1,050 (RV)	± 3.0%	22%	29%	49%

===== Results =====
2014 Ohio Supreme Court Associate Justice (Term commencing 01/02/2015) election
Party	Candidate	Votes	%
Nonpartisan	Judith L. French (incumbent)	1,438,283	55.94%
Nonpartisan	John P. O'Donnell	1,132,759	44.06%
Total votes		2,571,042	100.0%
Republican hold			

== Ballot initiatives ==
=== May election ===
Issue One
- TO FUND PUBLIC INFRASTRUCTURE CAPITAL IMPROVEMENTS BY PERMITTING THE ISSUANCE OF GENERAL OBLIGATION BONDS

Results
Choice	Votes	%
Yes	797,207	65.11%
No	427,273	34.89%
Yes
70–80%
60–70%
50–60%
No
50–60%

- Issue One: to fund public infrastructure capital improvements by permitting the issuance of general obligation bonds.

=== November election ===
No initiatives qualified for the November 2014 ballot.
