= Via Dolorosa (disambiguation) =

The Via Dolorosa (Latin for 'Sorrowful Way') is a street in the Old City of Jerusalem which is traditionally held to be the path Jesus walked on the way to his crucifixion.

Via Dolorosa may also refer to:

- Via Dolorosa (album), a 1995 album by Ophthalamia
- Via Dolorosa (play), a 1998 play by David Hare
- "Via Dolorosa" (song), a 1984 song by Sandi Patty
- "Via Dolorsa", a song by Matthew Good from the 2013 album Arrows of Desire
