= Jim Hughes (politician) =

American politician

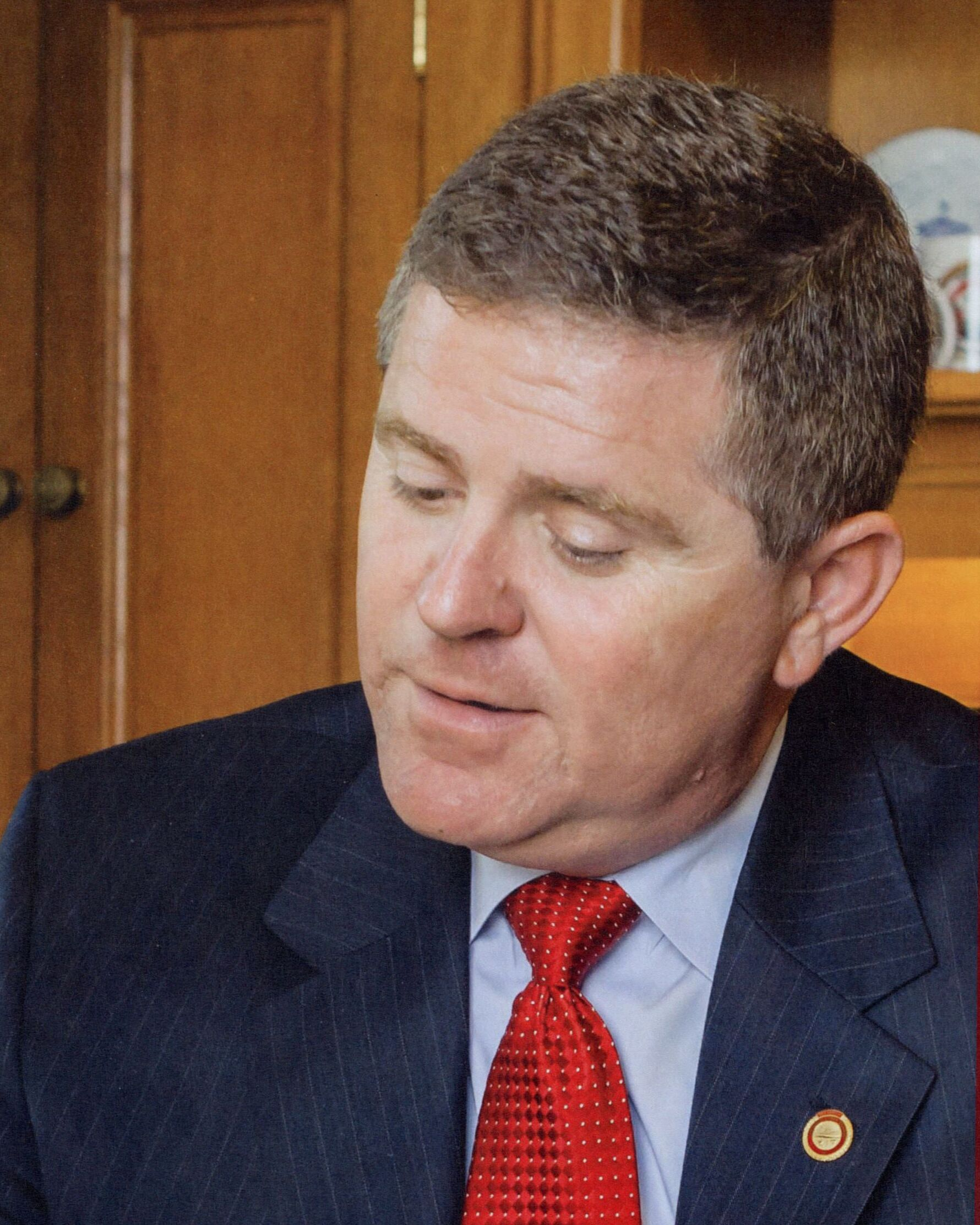

Member of the Ohio House of Representatives from the 24th district
- In office January 3, 2017 – December 31, 2018
- Preceded by: Stephanie Kunze
- Succeeded by: Allison Russo
- In office September 13, 2000-December 31, 2008
- Preceded by: David J. Robinson
- Succeeded by: John Patrick Carney

Member of the Ohio Senate from the 16th district
- In office January 5, 2009 – December 31, 2016
- Preceded by: Steve Stivers
- Succeeded by: Stephanie Kunze

Personal details
- Born: September 7, 1964 (age 62) Columbus, Ohio, U.S.
- Party: Republican
- Spouse: Susan Hughes
- Education: Ohio State University, Capital University
- Profession: Attorney

Jim Hughes (born September 7, 1964) is a former state representative for the 24th District of the Ohio House of Representatives. He is a Republican. The district consists of portions of Columbus, as well as Grove City, Hilliard, Upper Arlington, and Worthington in Franklin County. Hughes formerly was a member of the Ohio Senate from 2009 to 2016. He served in a similar seat in the House as well from 2000 to 2008.

== Career ==
Hughes began his career in public service as a prosecutor in the Columbus City Prosecutor's Office and later, as an Assistant County Prosecutor for Franklin County.

With Representative E. J. Thomas unable to run for another term in the House, Hughes sought to replace him, along with fellow Republican Dave Robinson. However, Hughes obtained the nomination with 58.3% of the vote. Soon after, Hughes career was expedited when Thomas decided to leave office early, which left House Republicans able to seat Hughes prior to the November elections. He won the general election against Democrat Mark Hatch with 51.9% of the electorate.

In 2002, Hughes won a second term with 65.2% of the vote. In 2004 Hughes sought a third term, and won against Democrat Brian McCann with 60.80% of the vote. Able to run for a final term, Hughes faced his toughest opposition yet in Democrat John Patrick Carney. However, he won a final term with 53.09% of the vote.

When Senator Steve Stivers decided to give up his second term in the Ohio Senate in order to run for Congress in 2008, Hughes sought the nomination to replace him. Unopposed in the primary, Hughes faced Democrat Danielle Blue in the general election. Although Democrats had high expectations for Blue in an overwhelmingly Democratic year, Hughes won the election with 58.06% of the electorate. Sworn into his first term on January 5, 2009, Senate President Bill Harris soon after appointed Hughes as Chairman of the Senate State and Local Government and Veterans Affairs Committee, Vice Chairman of the Judiciary-Criminal Justice Committee, and as a member of the Finance and Financial Institutions Committee, the Senate Energy and Public Utilities Committee and the Insurance, Commerce and Labor Committee for the 128th General Assembly. In 2012, Hughes won a second term in the Senate unopposed.

== Return to the Ohio House of Representatives ==
While it had been rumored that Hughes would potentially seek the office of Franklin County Prosecutor if it were to become open, it did not. Facing term-limits, Hughes instead decided to swap seats with state Representative Stephanie Kunze, who represented a seat similar to the one he formerly represented in the House from 2000 to 2008. Facing no primary for the nomination, Hughes went on to win the general election with nearly 60% of the vote.

Hughes opted not to run for another term in 2018, choosing instead to run for a seat on the Franklin County Court of Common Pleas. After running unopposed in the Republican primary, he was defeated by Democrat Karen Phipps in the general election, winning only 41.5% of the vote.

Ohio House of Representatives
Preceded by David J. Robinson	Member of the Ohio House of Representatives from the 27th district 2001–2003	Succeeded by Joyce Beatty
Preceded by Ray Miller	Member of the Ohio House of Representatives from the 22nd district 2003–2009	Succeeded by John Patrick Carney
Preceded by Stephanie Kunze	Member of the Ohio House of Representatives from the 24th district 2017–2019	Succeeded by Allison Russo
Ohio Senate
Preceded by Steve Stivers	Member of the Ohio Senate from the 16th district 2009–2017	Succeeded by Stephanie Kunze
