= Chaotic Neutral =

Chaotic Neutral may refer to:

- Chaotic neutral, a categorization of characters in Dungeons & Dragons
- Chaotic Neutral (album), by Matthew Good, 2015
