= David J. Leland =

American judge

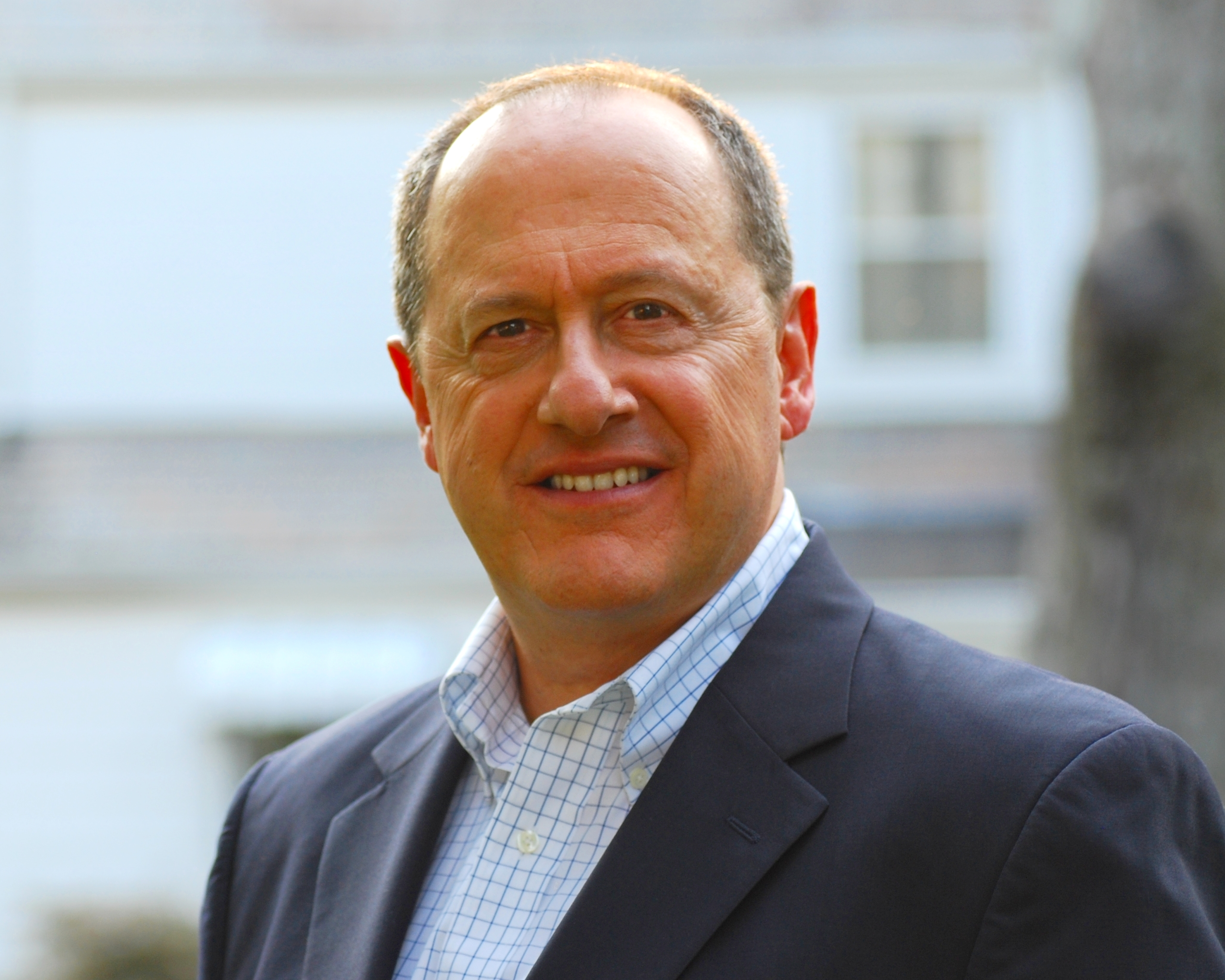

Judge, Ohio 10th District Court of Appeals
- Incumbent
- Assumed office February 9, 2023

Member of the Ohio House of Representatives from the 22nd district
- In office January 3, 2015 – December 31, 2022
- Preceded by: John Patrick Carney
- Succeeded by: Juanita Brent
- In office January 3, 1983 – December 31, 1984
- Preceded by: Larry Hughes
- Succeeded by: E. J. Thomas

Personal details
- Born: September 18, 1953 (age 73)
- Party: Democratic
- Education: Ohio State University; Capital University Law School
- Profession: Attorney

David J. Leland (born September 18, 1953) is a judge of the Ohio District Court of Appeals for the 10th District (Franklin County), elected in 2022. He was formerly a member of the Ohio House of Representatives representing the 22nd House district, and a partner at litigation law firm Carpenter Lipps & Leland LLP in Columbus, Ohio. Leland is the former Ohio Democratic Party Chair, a position he held from 1995 until 2002. Leland also served as the finance chair and senior advisor to the successful 2006 gubernatorial campaign of Ted Strickland, for which he helped raise a record $17 million.

A candidate for chair of the Democratic National Committee in 2005, Leland is one of Ohio's best-known lawyers, and has been active in state and national politics for over 50 years.

In November 2014, Leland was elected as State Representative of the 22nd Ohio House District, having served as representative of roughly the same district in the 115th Ohio General Assembly (1983–1985).

== Early life and education ==
Leland spent his early life in Kansas before moving to Columbus his senior year of high school. He graduated from Columbus North High School and Ohio State University, and then studied at nearby Capital University Law School, where he was a member of the Capital Law Review and earned his J.D. in 1978.

== Public service and political career ==
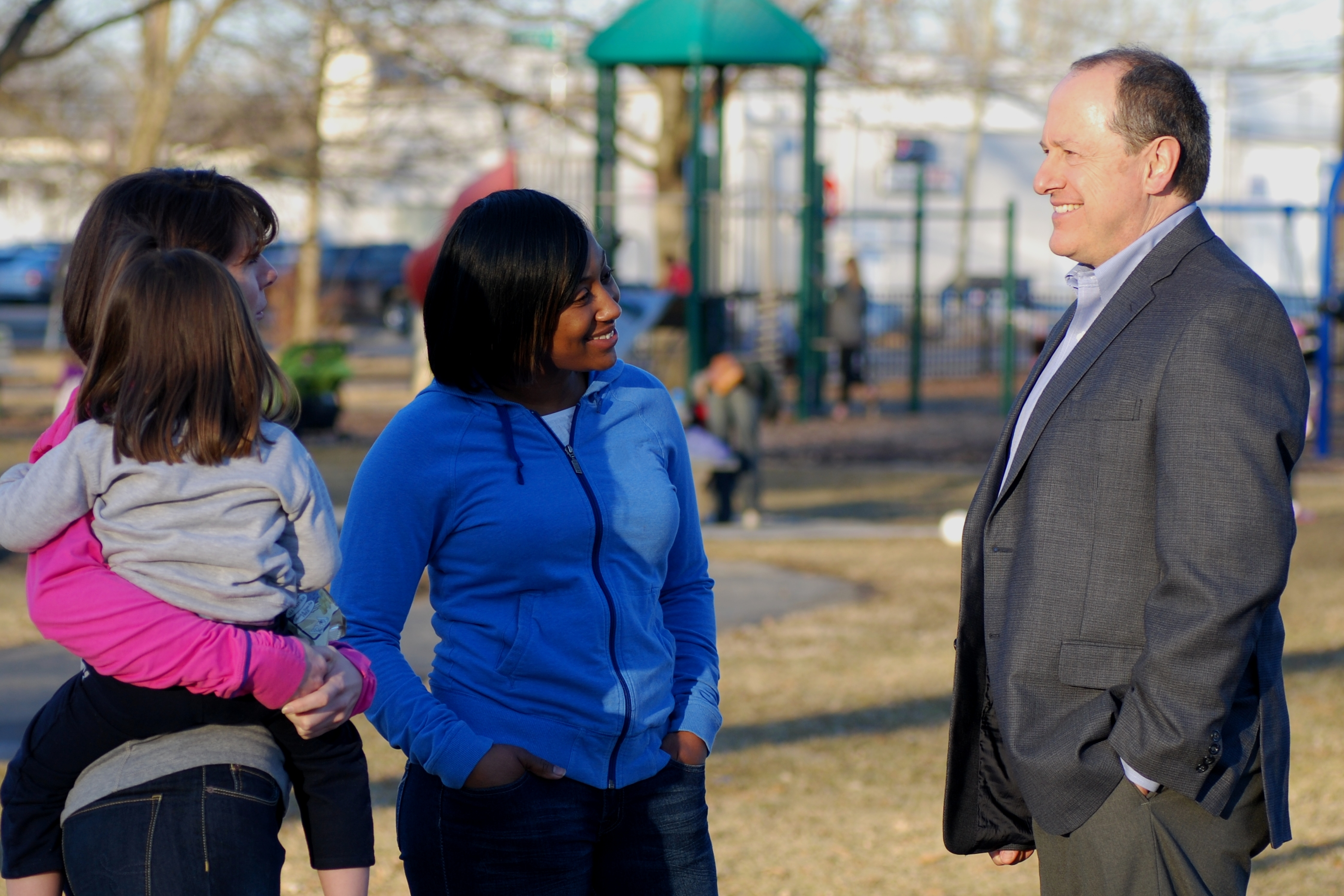

Leland became vice chairman of the Franklin County, Ohio Democratic Party at the age of 18. He was also elected to serve as committeeman for Franklin County's 19th ward, a position he held for 23 years.

In 1973, at age 20, Leland ran unsuccessfully for election to the Columbus, Ohio Board of Education, coming in fourth in a field of nine candidates (including three incumbents) for three open seats. All three incumbents, including later Chief Justice of the Ohio Supreme Court Thomas J. Moyer, were reelected.

Elected at the age of 29 to a term as state representative from Columbus (Clintonville) in the 115th Ohio General Assembly (1983–1985), Leland was a major proponent of Ohio's collective bargaining law and was voted the outstanding freshman state representative of that Assembly. He was elected to the first of his four terms as chair of the Ohio Democratic Party in 1995 during Bill Clinton's tenure as president. A year later, Leland was appointed to the Democratic National Committee's Rules and Bylaws Committee and served on the DNC's executive committee. Leland chaired Ohio's delegation to the 1996 and 2000 Democratic National Conventions.

In 2000, Clinton appointed Leland to the Federal Service Impasses Panel (FSIP) of the Federal Labor Relations Authority. The FSIP resolves disputes between the government and federal labor unions.

In 2002, Leland became national director of Project Vote a group which registered 2.7 million low-income and minority citizens as voters between 1982 and 2002.

After Leland's terms at both the ODP and DNC concluded in 2002, he launched a bid for Democratic National Committee Chair in 2005, with the position going to former Vermont governor and presidential candidate Howard Dean instead.

Leland continued to contribute to state politics, serving as finance chair and senior advisor to Ted Strickland's gubernatorial campaign in 2006 and helping to raise a record $17 million as Strickland won both his party's primary and the general election with comfortable margins. Strickland was the first Democrat to be elected governor in Ohio since 1983. Leland also served as the president and CEO of the Strickland/Fisher Inaugural Committee.

== 2014 candidacy for Ohio House ==
On September 12, 2013, Leland announced his candidacy for state representative of the 22nd district of the Ohio House of Representatives in the 2014 election. The 22nd Ohio House district (after redistricting that became effective with the 130th Assembly) includes much of the district (then OH 28) Leland served in the 115th Ohio General Assembly.

On November 4, 2014, Leland defeated Republican Andrew C. Hall with 16,315 votes to Hall's 10,128, or 62% of the vote. He was subsequently re-elected in 2016, 2018. He was re-elected in 2020 without opposition

== Private practice ==
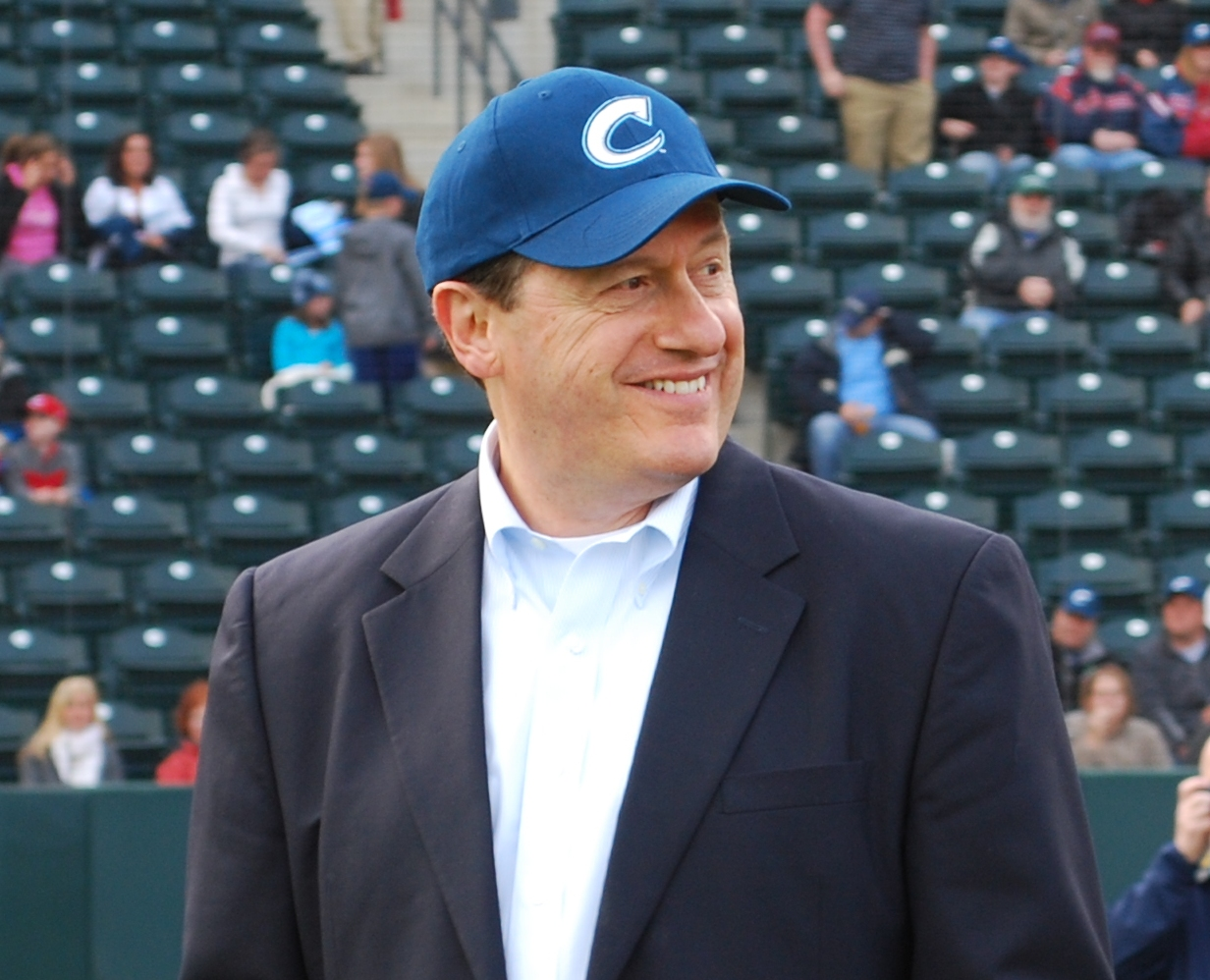
Leland at a Columbus Clippers game in 2012

Until 1996, Leland was counsel to the Columbus law firm of Schwartz, Kelm, Warren and Rubenstein. Prior to that, Leland served as Transportation Director for the Public Utilities Commission of Ohio. Leland also served as general counsel to the Ohio Civil Service Employees Association (OCSEA/AFSCME Local 11).

In January 2007, Leland joined the law firm of Carpenter & Lipps, which was renamed in March 2008; Carpenter Lipps & Leland. Leland left the firm in February 2023 to assume his Judicial responsibilities on the Ohio 10th District Court of Appeals

== Personal life ==
Leland is active in the Columbus community and has received numerous community service awards and citations.

An avid baseball fan, Leland served on the board of directors of the Columbus Clippers, the Cleveland Guardians' AAA franchise, from 2005 to 2023. During his tenure the Clippers won two National Championships and constructed a state-of-the-art, baseball complex named Huntington Park.

Leland has lived in the Clintonville neighborhood of north Columbus since 1970.
