= Kim Churchill =

Australian singer and songwriter

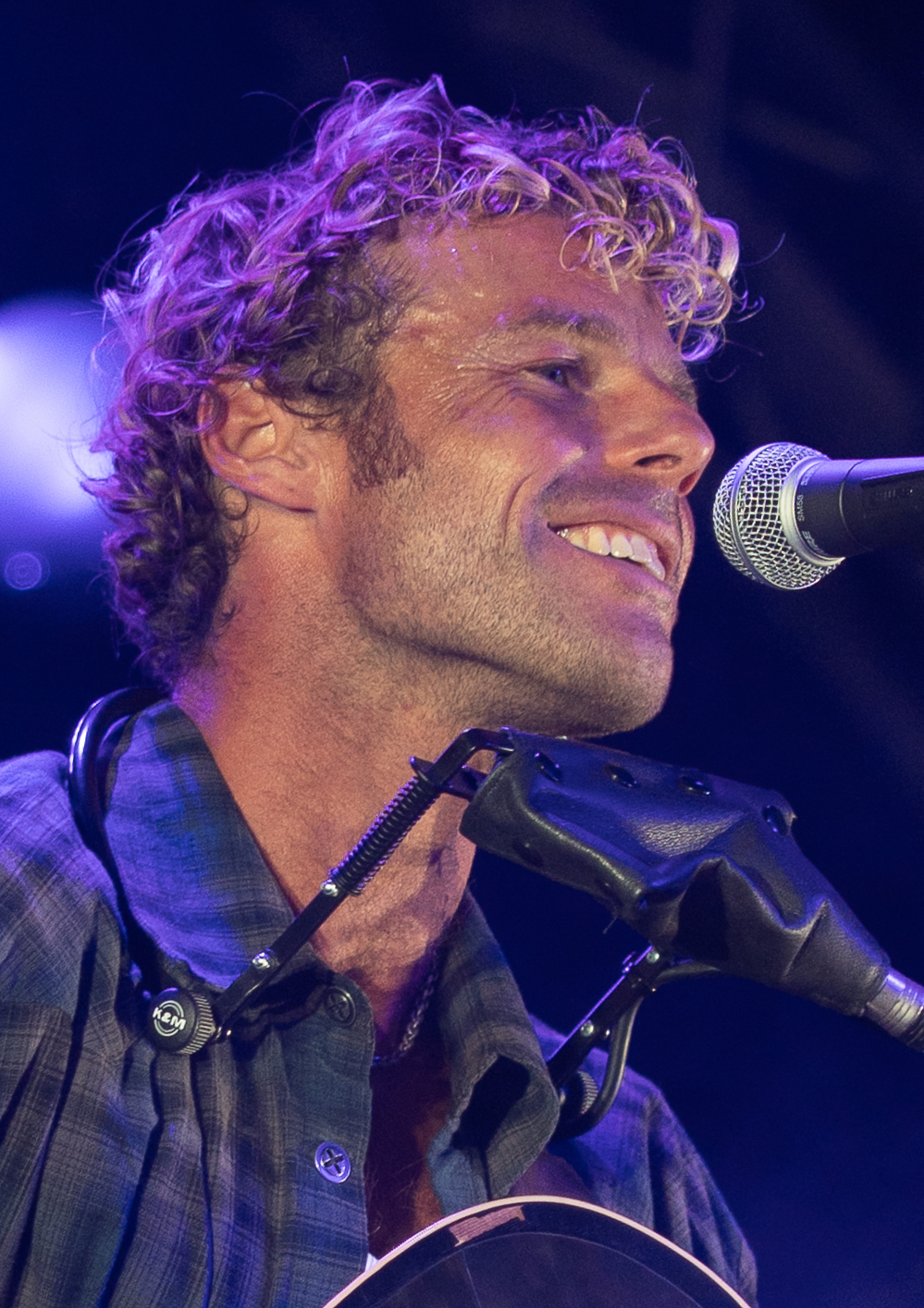
- Kim Churchill, in 2026

Background information
- Born: 26 September 1990 (age 36); Canberra, Australian Capital Territory, Australia
- Origin: Merimbula, New South Wales
- Genres: Folk; rock; blues
- Occupations: Singer, songwriter, musician
- Instruments: Vocals; guitar; harmonica; percussion
- Years active: 2009–present
- Labels: Indica; Warner Music Australia; Sony/ATV Music Publishing
- Website: KimChurchill.com

Kim Sebastian Churchill (born 26 September 1990 in Canberra) is an Australian folk, rock, and blues singer, songwriter, and musician. He has released six albums: With Sword and Shield/Kim Churchill in 2010, Detail of Distance in 2012, Into the Steel in 2013, Silence/Win in 2014 and Weight Falls in 2017, and “Dawn Sounds” in 2022. He is signed to Montreal-based Canadian label Indica Records.

== Career ==
Kim Churchill was born in Canberra and moved to the town of Merimbula at around age seven. He picked his first guitar when he was 4 years old when his father promised him a guitar if he did well in school. He was trained in classical guitar for ten years. He accompanies his guitar with blues harp (harmonica), stomp box, drums, and percussion instruments. He also plays lapsteel and tambourine.

He started singing and playing in front of crowds very early, writing songs while experimenting various tunes or while busking in various venues. An avid fan of surfing, he incorporated the sport in many of his songs and music videos. Churchill tours extensively and has become a favourite during music festivals including the East Coast Blues & Roots Music Festival (Australia's "Bluesfest"), the Woodford Folk Festival, and other Australian venues. He has particular following in Canada where he took part in Canadian Music Week, the Ottawa Folk Festival and the famous Montreal International Jazz Festival. He enjoys good following in the United States where he performed at the South by Southwest festival in Austin, Texas and the International Folk Federation Conference in Memphis, plus a tour in England, other European venues, and in Japan.

He released his debut single "Loving Home" that received regular airplay nationally on Australian Triple J radio and ABC Radio National, as well as local and community stations all over Australia. His debut album was entitled With Sword and Shield and released under the title Kim Churchill internationally.

Churchill's second studio album was released on 15 May 2012 being the album Detail of Distance. It was recorded in Vancouver, Canada and was produced by Tod Simko and released by Indica Records. Owing to his popularity in Canada, the release was supported by a 2012 pan-Canadian national summer tour. In 2013 Churchill supported Billy Bragg on his Tooth and Nail tour.

His fourth album Silence/Win was released on 1 April 2014 through Fontana North. Produced by Warne Livesey, it was recorded primarily in sessions in Ucluelet on Vancouver Island, BC, Canada. He also engaged on a pan-Canadian tour to promote the album. The track "Some Days the Rain May Fall" from the album charted on ARIA, the official Australian Singles Chart reaching number 86. Another track from the same album "Window to the Sky" was remixed by the French deep house and electro music producer The Avener and released in France as "You're My Window to the Sky" and charting on SNEP, the French Official Singles Chart.

In 2023, "Window to the Sky" was certified Platinum by Australian Recording Industry Association (ARIA), while at the same time the 2017 "Second Hand Car" was certified Gold.

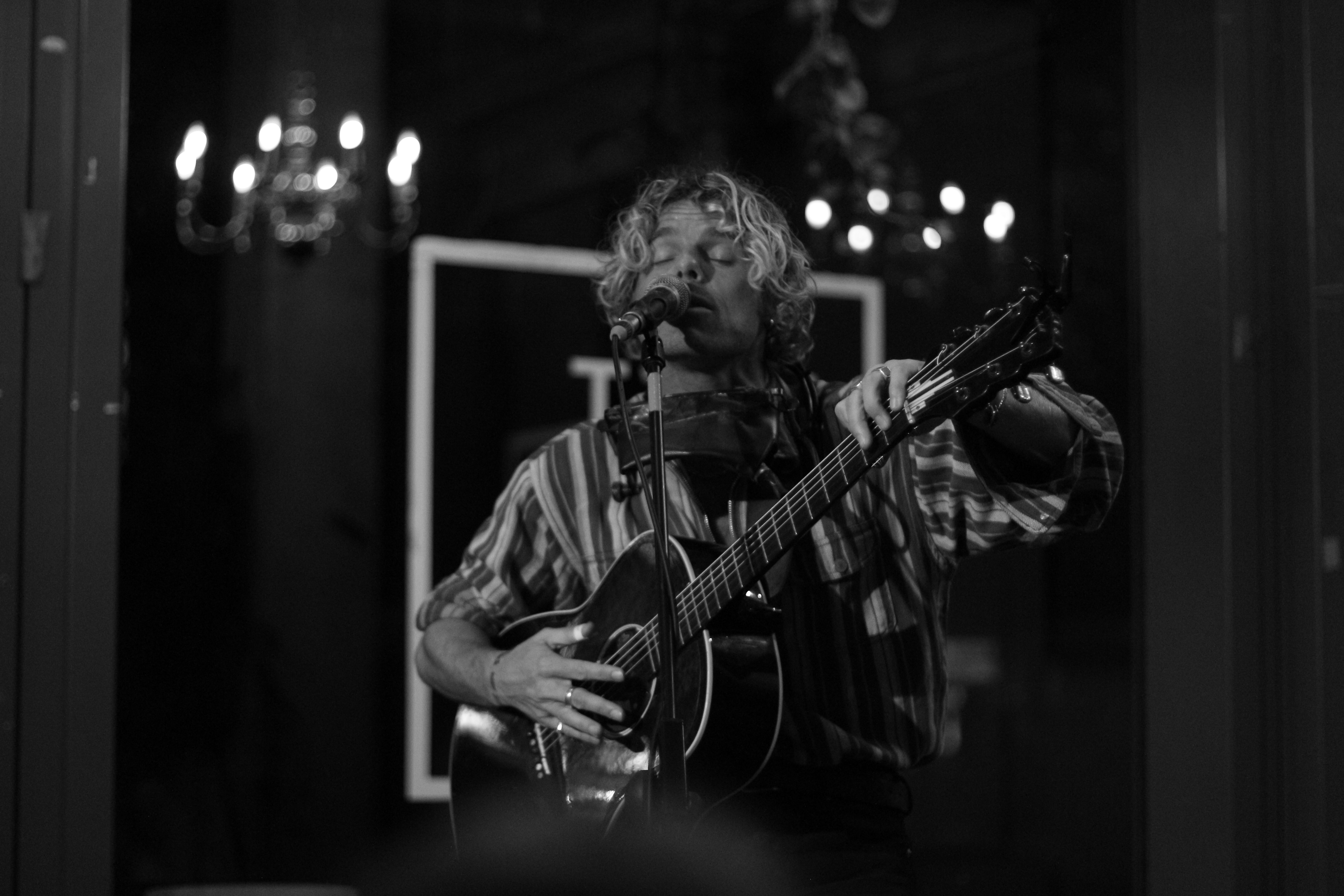
Kim Churchill, live at Lost Weekend, Munich Germany, 16th September 2025. Photo: A. Healey.

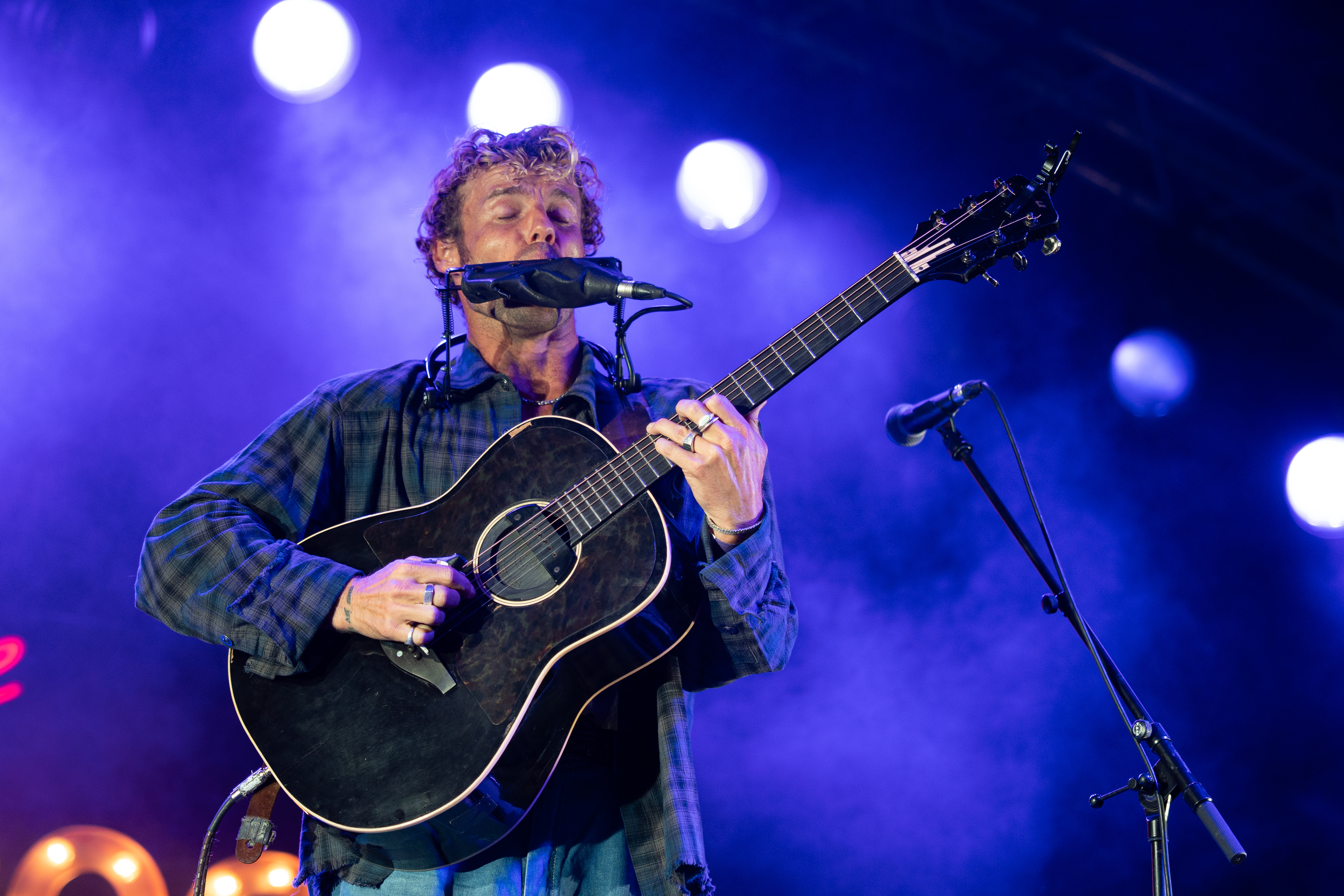
Kim Churchill at Montreux Jazz Festival 2026

== Reception ==
As part of a review of a Billy Bragg concert for the Vancouver Weekly, critic Jason Motz said, "Opening on this night was the young, barefooted Aussie, Kim Churchill. Churchill made the most of an acoustic guitar, kick drum, pedals and a harmonica. Creating a sound I can only describe as psychedelic whale music, ocean-side blues or countrified Nick Drake, Churchill delivered an off-the-cuff set punctuated by a cover of Dylan’s "Subterranean Homesick Blues". Kim Churchill. Remember that name. He’s going to impress a whole mess of people on this tour. Next year, he could very well be headlining the Vogue."

== Discography ==
=== Albums ===
Title	Details	Peak chart positions
Title	Details	AUS
With Sword and Shield / Kim Churchill	Released: 2009; Label: Kim Churchill / Indica Records (INDCD115); Format: Digital download, CD	—
Detail Of Distance	Released: 6 April 2012; Label: Kim Churchill (KC4) / Indica (INDCD128); Format: Digital download, CD	—
Into the Steel	Released: January 2013; Label: Kim Churchill; Format: Digital download, CD	—
Silence/Win	Released: 3 February 2017; Label: Kim Churchill / Fontana North (3933); Format: Digital download, CD	32
Weight Falls	Released: 18 August 2017; Label: Kim Churchill (KC6), Warner Music Australia; Format: Digital download, CD, LP, streaming	6
Dawn Sounds	Scheduled: 13 January 2023; Label: Kim Churchill, Warner Music Australia; Format: Digital download, streaming	—
It's Lovely to Have You Here	Released: 11 October 2024; Label: Kim Churchill, Warner Music Australia; Format: Digital download, streaming	61
"—" denotes a recording that did not chart or was not released in that territory.

=== Mixtapes ===
Title	Details
Somewhere Over the Rainbow	Released: 6 May 2021; Label: Kim Churchill; Format: Digital download
Stronger / Landslide	Released: 20 May 2021; Label: Kim Churchill; Format: Digital download
Colours of the Wind	Released: 27 May 2021; Label: Kim Churchill; Format: Digital download
Bright Side Mixtape	Released: 3 June 2021; Label: Kim Churchill; Format: Digital download

=== Live albums ===
Title	Details
Montreal Attic Recordings	Released: 2011; Label: Kim Churchill; Format: Digital download
FestivaLink Presents: Kim Churchill at Kerrville Wine & Music Festival, TX 9/2/11	Released: 26 October 2011; Label: Format: Digital download
Montreal Attic Recordings: Vol.2	Released: 2013; Label: Kim Churchill (KC6); Format: CDR, Digital Download
"—" denotes a recording that did not chart or was not released in that territory.

=== EPs ===
Title	EP details
Turns to Stone	Released: 13 May 2011; Label: Kim Churchill; Format: Digital download
I Am	Released: 3 May 2019; Label: Rufus Nomad; Format: Digital download, streaming
Forgetting	Released: 25 October 2019; Label: Rufus Nomad; Format: Digital download, streaming
The End	Released: 25 October 2020; Label: Kim Churchill; Format: Digital download, streaming
Feeling Whitney	Released: 18 February 2021; Label: Kim Churchill; Format: Digital download, streaming
Again	Released: 19 March 2021; Label: Kim Churchill; Format: Digital download, streaming
Most of the Time	Released: 18 February 2021; Label: Kim Churchill; Format: Digital download, streaming

=== Singles ===
Year	Title	Peak positions		Certification	Album
Year	Title	AUS	FRA	Certification	Album
2010	"Loving Home"	—	—		With Sword and Shield
2014	"Window to the Sky"	86	—	ARIA: Platinum	Silence / Win
2014	"Some Days the Rain May Fall"	—	—		Silence / Win
2015	"You're My Window to the Sky" (The Avener and Kim Churchill)	—	119		The Wanderings of the Avener
2017	"Second Hand Car"	—	—	ARIA: Gold	Weight Falls
2017	"Breakneck Speed"	—	—		Weight Falls
2018	"Weight Falls"	—	—		Weight Falls
2019	"After the Sun"	—	—		I Am
2019	"See You Soon"	—	—		Forgetting
2019	"Caught up in the Landslide"	—	—		Forgetting
2020	"Nothing Nothing"	—	—		The End
2020	"Don't Know How to Keep Loving You (triple j Like a Version)"	—	—		non album single
2020	"Outta Love"	—	—		The End
2022	"Fighter"	—	—		Dawn Sounds
2022	"Please Come Home" (with Steph Stringer)	—	—		Dawn Sounds
2022	"Come Back Free"	—	—		Dawn Sounds
2023	"Go, Try, Fall"	—	—		Dawn Sounds
2023	"These Dreams"	—	—		TBA
2023	"Way Back Home"	—	—		TBA
2024	"Theatre Lights" (with Filipe Baldomir)	—	—		TBA
2024	"Hobbies"	—	—		It's Lovely To Have You Here
2024	"Calm to the Sean"	—	—		It's Lovely To Have You Here
2024	"Wonder"	—	—		It's Lovely To Have You Here
2025	"Raindrops" (with Shungudzo)	—	—		

== Awards and nominations ==
- In 2009, Kim Churchill won Australia's National Youth Folk Artist of the Year.

=== APRA Awards ===
The APRA Awards are presented annually from 1982 by the Australasian Performing Right Association (APRA), "honouring composers and songwriters".

Year	Nominee / work	Award	Result	Ref.
2015	"Window to the Sky"	Blues & Roots Work of the Year	Nominated	
2019	"Secondhand Car"	Blues & Roots Work of the Year	Nominated	

=== Environmental Music Prize ===
The Environmental Music Prize is a quest to find a theme song to inspire action on climate and conservation. It commenced in 2022.

Year	Nominee / work	Award	Result	Ref.
2025	"Reflecting" (with Emily Brimlow)	Environmental Music Prize	Nominated	

=== National Live Music Awards ===
The National Live Music Awards (NLMAs) are a broad recognition of Australia's diverse live industry, celebrating the success of the Australian live scene. The awards commenced in 2016.

Year	Nominee / work	Award	Result
National Live Music Awards of 2016	Kim Churchill	Live Roots Act of the Year	Nominated
