= Had It Coming =

- Standard edition

Single by Matthew Good

from the album Arrows of Desire
- Released: May 28, 2013
- Genre: Alternative rock
- Length: 2:40
- Label: FrostByte Media Inc
- Songwriter(s): Matthew Good

Matthew Good singles chronology
"Zero Orchestra" (2011)	"Had It Coming" (2013)	"Arrows Of Desire" (2013)

Music video
- "Had It Coming" on YouTube

"Had It Coming" is a song by Canadian singer-songwriter Matthew Good. It was released as the lead single from Good's sixth solo album, Arrows of Desire. The song was first released to Canadian radio on May 27, 2013 and was officially released on ITunes on May 28. Upon release, the song reached #1 on the ITunes Top Rock Songs chart in Canada. On June 4, an Extended Version of the single was released, featuring the song "We're Long Gone".

== Description ==
In an interview with The Huffington Post Canada, Good gave a description of what the song is about:

It's exactly what it sounds like. In the first part I talk about myself. It's a first-person kind of thing. It's not 'I had it coming' in a bad way. It's just like, 'Oh finally. It's about time I had it coming.' Then in the second verse I talk about everyday ordinary people caught in the 9-to-5. And they slip into the dream of those pressures being released from them. That's the whole reference to breathing under water. You can find that you can breathe. And I go on to 'you've had it coming' 'Yay.' And then I go on to say that we've all had it coming — might as well put it all together in one big fuckin' package — and the song's over. That's pretty much it.

== Music video ==
The music video for "Had It Coming" was filmed and directed by David Spearing. It features Good walking down the streets of London, England to go perform a show at a club. It is the first music video released for a Matthew Good single since "It's Been a While Since I Was Your Man" in 2004.
