= Steve Stivers =

American politician (born 1965)

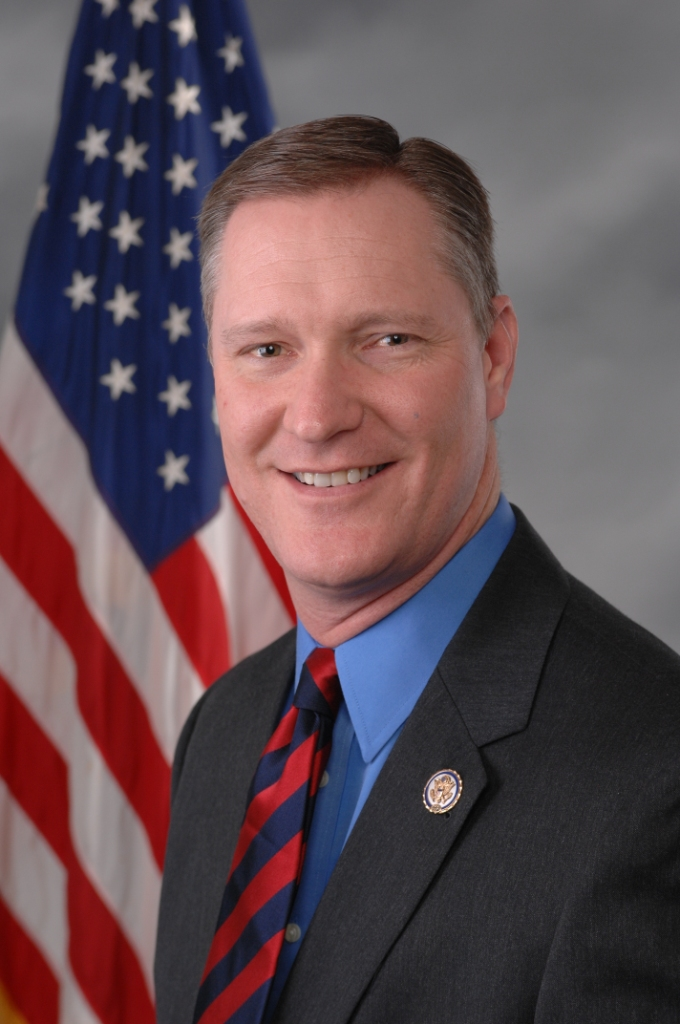
- Official portrait, 2011

Chair of the National Republican Congressional Committee
- In office January 3, 2017 – January 3, 2019
- Leader: Paul Ryan
- Preceded by: Greg Walden
- Succeeded by: Tom Emmer

Member of the U.S. House of Representatives from Ohio's 15th district
- In office January 3, 2011 – May 16, 2021
- Preceded by: Mary Jo Kilroy
- Succeeded by: Mike Carey

Member of the Ohio Senate from the 16th district
- In office January 6, 2003 – December 31, 2008
- Preceded by: Priscilla Mead
- Succeeded by: Jim Hughes

Personal details
- Born: Steven Ernst Stivers; March 24, 1965 (age 61) Ripley, Ohio, U.S.
- Party: Republican
- Spouse: Karen Stivers
- Children: 2
- Education: Ohio State University (BA, MBA); United States Army War College (MA)

Military service
- Branch/service: United States Army
- Years of service: 1985–present
- Rank: Major General
- Commands: 371st Sustainment Brigade
- Awards: Bronze Star; Meritorious Service; Army Commendation Medal; Reserve Good Conduct; National Defense Service Medal

Steven Ernst Stivers (/ˈstaɪvərz/ STY-vərz; born March 24, 1965) is an American businessman, soldier, and politician who was the U.S. representative for Ohio's 15th congressional district from 2011 until 2021. He is a member of the Republican Party, and became chair of the National Republican Congressional Committee in 2017. Stivers previously served in the Ohio Senate, representing the 15th district. He is a major general in the Ohio Army National Guard, serving as the Assistant Adjutant General, and served active duty in Iraq as a battalion commander until December 2005. On May 16, 2021, he resigned his seat to become the president and CEO of the Ohio Chamber of Commerce.

== Early life and education ==
Stivers was born and grew up in Ripley, Ohio, the son of Carol Sue (née Pulliam) and Ernst Bambach Stivers. Steve is a recipient of the Eagle Scout Award.

Stivers attended the Ohio State University where he earned a Bachelor of Arts degree in economics and international relations in 1989 and an MBA in 1996. While attending Ohio State he joined the Delta Upsilon fraternity.

== Career ==
Stivers spent seven years at Bank One, three years at the Ohio Company, two years as finance director for the Franklin County Republican Party and five years as a staff member in the Ohio Senate. Stivers worked as a Series 7 licensed securities trader with the Ohio Company.

=== Military service ===
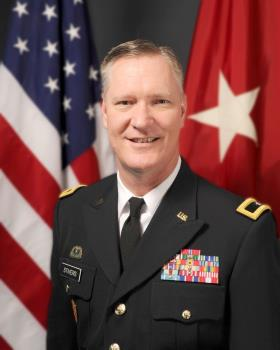
Stivers in uniform, 2020

Stivers has served in the Ohio Army National Guard since 1985 and holds the rank of Major General in the Logistics branch. Stivers was called to active duty while serving in the Ohio Senate in October 2004. It was then that Stivers served in Iraq, Kuwait, Qatar, and Djibouti as battalion commander until December 2005. He was awarded a Bronze Star for his accomplishments as a battalion commander during Operation Iraqi Freedom.

== Ohio Senate ==
=== Elections ===
In December 2002, Republican Priscilla Mead resigned after serving in the Ohio Senate for only a year. Stivers was recommended by a Senate screening committee and was appointed by election of the Senate Republicans on January 4, 2003. He won re-election in 2004 to a full senate term with 58% of the vote.

=== Tenure ===
Stivers served in the Ohio Senate from January 9, 2003, until December 2008.

=== Committee assignments ===
Stivers was the Chairman of the Insurance, Commerce and Labor Committee; Vice-Chair of the Finance and Financial Institutions Committee; and served on the Ways and Means Committee, the Judiciary Committee on Civil Justice, the Judiciary Committee for Criminal Justice, and the Controlling Board.

== U.S. House of Representatives ==
=== Elections ===
==== 2008 ====
In November 2007, Stivers announced he would run for election to Congress in Ohio's 15th District, a seat held by retiring Republican member Deborah Pryce. He won the Republican nomination and ran against Democratic Franklin County Commissioner Mary Jo Kilroy, who had nearly unseated Pryce in 2006, Libertarian Mark Noble and Independent Don Elijah Eckhart. Stivers lost by 2,311 votes, conceding on December 7, 2008, after a long vote recount.

==== 2010 ====
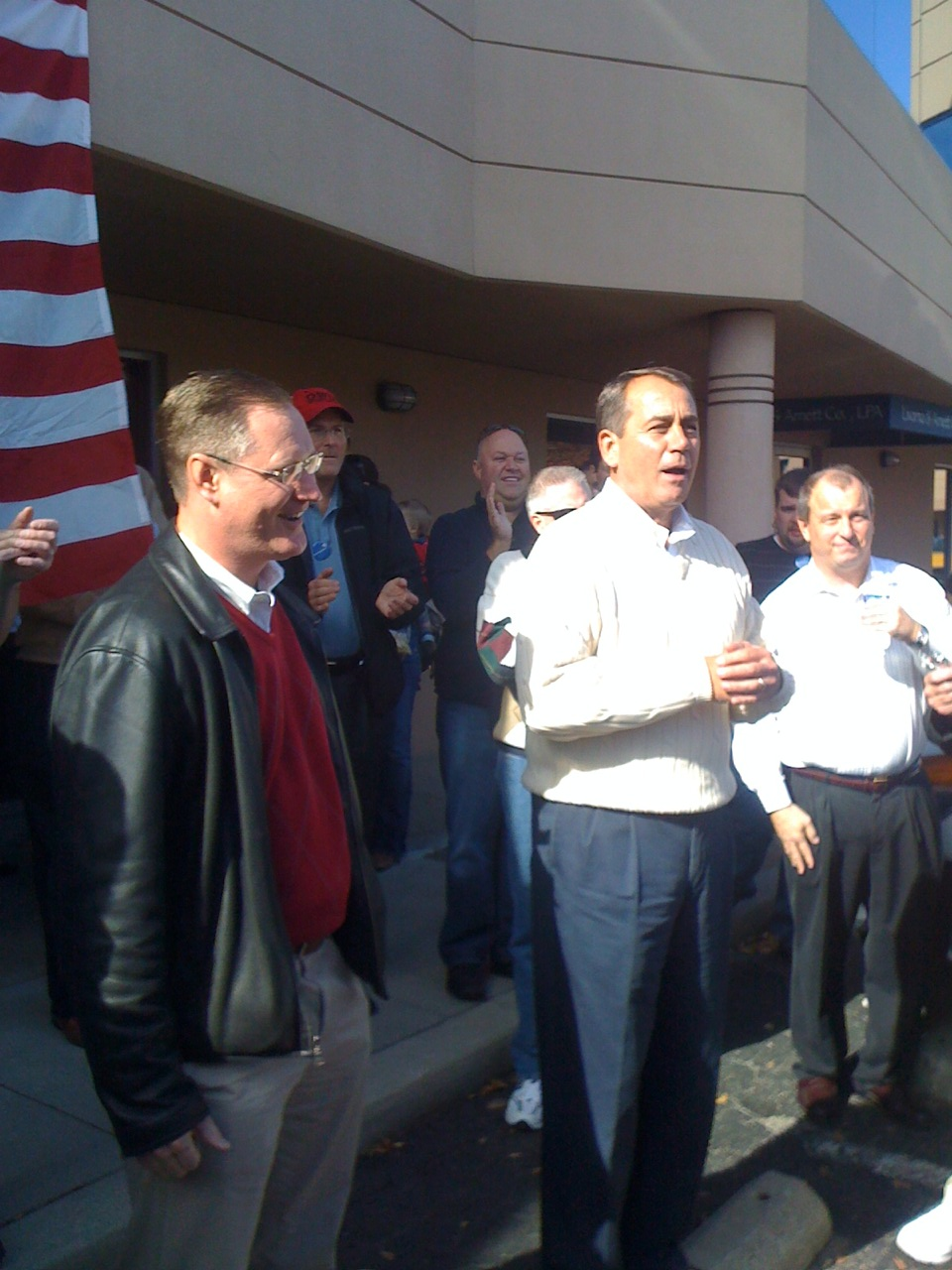
John Boehner, the then-House Minority Leader, campaigning for fellow Ohio Congressman Steve Stivers (left) during the 2010 midterm elections

Stivers won the Republican primary with 82% of the vote. He again faced Democratic incumbent Mary Jo Kilroy along with Constitution Party nominee David Ryon and Libertarian nominee William J. Kammerer. On November 2, 2010, Kilroy conceded to Stivers, who won by a 54% to 42% margin.

==== 2012 ====
Redistricting after the 2010 census made the 15th much friendlier to Stivers. During his first term, he represented a fairly compact district covering all of Union and Madison counties, as well as most of downtown and western Columbus. The new map, however, pushed the 15th into more rural and exurban territory south and west of the capital.

Stivers ran again in 2012 against Democratic nominee Pat Lang. He was endorsed by the NRA, National Right to Life, Ohio State Medical Association and United States Chamber of Commerce. Stivers was re-elected by 76,397 votes.

==== 2014 ====
Stivers ran in 2014 against Democratic Scott Wharton. Gaining more than 66 percent of the vote, he was reelected for a third term.

==== 2016 ====
Stivers ran in 2016 against Democrat Scott Wharton for the OH-15 seat. Winning 66.2% (222,847) of the vote to Wharton's 33.8% (113,960).

=== Tenure ===
The Lugar Center and the McCourt School of Public Policy ranked Stivers as the 36th and 37th most bipartisan member of the U.S. House during the 114th (2015–17) and 115th Congresses. His resignation triggered a special election in 2021 which was won by fellow republican Mike Carey.

==== Budget, taxation, and other economic issues ====
Stivers has voted against raising the debt limit when there was no offset or systemic reform and supports prioritizing spending in the event that the debt limit is reached. Stiver voted in favor of a Balanced Budget Amendment to the U.S. Constitution. Stivers voted to offset the costs of disaster relief spending through discretionary budget cuts.

Stivers took a pledge to not support any tax raises. He voted in favor of the Trump administration's 2017 tax legislation.

Stivers voted in favor of legislation to dismantle financial regulations enacted by the Dodd–Frank Wall Street Reform and Consumer Protection Act. He voted to repeal a rule that would have barred some financial services companies from including mandatory arbitration clauses in contracts.

He voted to audit the Federal Reserve System.

Stivers voted in favor of a stopgap funding measure to end the January 2018 federal government shutdown, but during the December 2018 to January 2019 partial federal government shutdown, Stivers voted against several pieces of legislation to reopen the federal government without appropriating money for a U.S.-Mexico border wall.

In March 2021, all House Republicans including Stivers voted against the American Rescue Plan Act of 2021, an economic stimulus bill aimed at speeding up the United States' recovery from the economic and health effects of the COVID-19 pandemic and the ongoing recession.

==== Health care ====
Stivers voted in favor of the American Health Care Act of 2017, legislation that would have partially repealed the Affordable Care Act.

==== Energy and environment ====
Stivers voted against a measure to block President Trump from withdrawing the United States from the Paris Agreement on climate change. Stivers voted against carbon tax. He voted in favor of Congressional Review Act legislation that repealed the Stream Protection Rule, and voted in favor of a measure to delay implementation of the ozone National Ambient Air Quality Standards (NAAQS) program. He opposes federal regulations on efficiency standards.

==== Gun control ====
Stivers voted against legislation to require universal background checks for firearm purchases. He voted in favor of making concealed-carry permits issued in one state valid in other states. He voted against a measure to grant law enforcement agencies additional time to conduct firearm-purchase background checks.

==== Foreign policy ====
In 2019, Stivers voted against legislation to halt U.S. military assistance to the Saudi Arabian-led intervention in Yemen. He voted in favor of 2017 legislation to impose additional sanctions against Russia, Iran, and North Korea, which passed on a 419–3 vote.

==== Immigration and travel ====
Stivers opposed President Donald Trump's issuance of Executive Order 13769, which imposed a temporary ban on entry to the U.S. to citizens of seven Muslim-majority countries, in 2017. Stivers stated: "I believe the executive order risks violating our nation's values and fails to differentiate mainstream Islamic partners from radical Islamic terrorists — setting back our fight against radical Islam. I urge the Administration to quickly replace this temporary order with permanent improvements in the visa vetting process."

In 2019, Stivers voted against overriding Trump's veto of a bill to overturn Trump's declaration of an emergency to direct funding for the construction of a U.S.-Mexico border wall.

==== Privacy and technology ====
Stivers voted to rescind a Federal Communications Commission regulation that barred Internet service providers from sharing data on the Web activities of their customers. Stivers voted in favor of the Foreign Intelligence Surveillance Act of 1978 Amendments Act of 2008, including a provision reauthorizing a warrantless spying program. Strivers voted against a measure that would have curtailed the power of officials to "search and read private messages collected incidentally" under Foreign Intelligence Surveillance Act authorities.

Stivers voted against the restoration of the net neutrality rule.

==== Social issues ====
Stivers voted in favor of federal legislation to ban abortion after the 20th week of pregnancy. He voted against repealing a rule that barred state and local governments from refusing to distribute federal funds to any Federally Qualified Health Center on the basis that that health center also performed abortions. Stivers voted against a measure to oppose the Trump administration's ban on openly transgender Americans serving in the U.S. military.

Social Security

In 2018, Stivers called for some form of bipartisan Social Security reform.

==== National Republican Congressional Committee ====
Stivers beat Representative Roger Williams to be elected to chair the National Republican Congressional Committee in November 2016. As the leader of the NRCC, which is charged with helping elect Republican House candidates, Stivers said his goal was to "defy history" by protecting his party's House majority in the 2018 elections. In June 2018, Stivers did not denounce the use of hacked materials in election campaigns, saying that as chair of the National Republican Congressional Committee he wouldn't "run down one of my candidates for using something that's in the public domain." In a later interview in September 2018, Stivers made it clear he did not condone the use of hacked material, telling the press, "We are not seeking stolen or hacked material, we do not want to be stolen or hacked material, we have no intention of using stolen or hacked material."

In the aftermath of the 2018 election, in which Republicans lost their House majority, Stivers announced that he would not run for re-election as NRCC chair.

==== Candidate conduct ====
In response to congressional candidate Greg Gianforte being charged with assault on the eve of Montana's special election, Stivers characterized the assault as "out of character." He said, "we all make mistakes" and "need to let the facts surrounding this incident unfold." The assault was witnessed by four Fox News reporters and the victim's account corroborated by their audio recording.

In July 2018, Stivers and the NRCC withdrew support from New Jersey candidate Seth Grossman following reports he shared a post from a white supremacist.

Additionally, days before the midterm elections, Stivers sent a tweet condemning white nationalist comments and actions from Congressman Steve King, saying "We must stand up against white supremacy and hate in all forms can and I strongly condemn this behavior."

=== Committee assignments ===
- Committee on Financial Services
  - Subcommittee on Investor Protection, Entrepreneurship, and Capital Markets
  - Subcommittee on National Security, International Development and Monetary Policy (Ranking member)

=== Caucus memberships ===
- Republican Study Committee
- Republican Main Street Partnership
- Congressional Arts Caucus
- Congressional Civility and Respect Caucus
- Republican Governance Group

== Electoral history ==
Election results
Year	Office	Election	Subject	Party	Votes	%	Opponent	Party	Votes	%	Opponent	Party	Votes	%	Opponent	Party	Votes	%	
2004	Ohio Senate	General	Steve Stivers	Republican	95,251	57.58%	Katherine Thomsen	Democratic	55,656	33.65%	Don Eckhart	Independent	14,509	8.77%					
2008	U.S. House of Representatives	General	Steve Stivers	Republican	137,272	45.18%	Mary Jo Kilroy	Democratic	139,584	45.94%	Mark M. Noble	Libertarian	14,061	4.63%	Don Eckhart	Independent	12,915	4.25%	*
2010	U.S. House of Representatives	General	Steve Stivers	Republican	119,471	54.16%	Mary Jo Kilroy	Democratic	91,077	41.29%	William Kammerer	Libertarian	6,116	2.77%	David Ryon	Constitution	3,887	1.76%	**
2012	U.S. House of Representatives	General	Steve Stivers	Republican	205,277	61.56%	Pat Lang	Democratic	128,188	38.44%									
2014	U.S. House of Representatives	General	Steve Stivers	Republican	128,496	66.02%	Scott Wharton	Democratic	66,125	33.98%									
2016	U.S. House of Representatives	General	Steve Stivers	Republican	222,847	66.17%	Scott Wharton	Democratic	113,960	33.84%									
2018	U.S. House of Representatives	General	Steve Stivers	Republican	166,632	58.54%	Rick Neal	Democratic	112,546	39.54%	Jonathan Miller	Libertarian	5,477	1.92%					
2020	U.S. House of Representatives	General	Steve Stivers	Republican	243,103	63.43%	Joel Newby	Democratic	140,183	36.57%									

*Write-in candidate Travis Casper received 6 votes (0.00197%)
**Write-in candidate Bill Buckel received 45 votes (0.02%)

U.S. House of Representatives
Preceded by Mary Jo Kilroy	Member of the U.S. House of Representatives from Ohio's 15th congressional district 2011–2021	Succeeded by Mike Carey
Party political offices
Preceded by Greg Walden	Chair of the National Republican Congressional Committee; 2017–2019	Succeeded by Tom Emmer
U.S. order of precedence (ceremonial)
Preceded by Bob Ney as Former U.S. Representative	Order of precedence of the United States as Former U.S. Representative	Succeeded by Jimmy Hayes as Former U.S. Representative
