= Moving Walls =

2020 studio album by Matthew Good

Studio album by Matthew Good
- Released: February 21, 2020
- Genre: Alternative rock
- Length: 63:56
- Label: Warner Music Canada
- Producer: Warne Livesey

Matthew Good chronology
Something Like a Storm (2017)	Moving Walls (2020)

Singles from Moving Walls
- 1. "Sicily" Released: October 18, 2019; 2. "Selling You My Heart" Released: January 24, 2020

Professional ratings
Review scores
Source	Rating
Exclaim	6/10 stars
Punknews.org	4/5 stars

Moving Walls is the ninth solo album by Matthew Good. The album was previewed with a single, "Sicily", which was released on October 18, 2019, with an accompanying music video. A second single, "Selling You My Heart", was released on January 24, 2020, with the album following on February 21, 2020.

== Background ==
The album was recorded after Good's divorce and during the time he was living at his parents house. He had gone to help his mum with his dad who has dementia and cancer. Good would work from eight in the evening, until 3:00 am the following morning, demoing songs in his parents garage. Some of the effects from the demos ended up on the album; on "Dreading it", the acoustic strumming at the start of the song is Good's daughter, Elizabeth trying the guitar, and the rain on "Fingernails" is as recorded hitting Good's parent's garage door.

In a press release, Good himself described the album as "sumptuous, orchestral, and wildly multifaceted." The album was recorded with Warne Livesey, a long-time collaborator with Good, at the Bathouse Studio in Ontario. One of the songs on the album, "Lumiére Noire", is sung entirely in French, something which Good ashamedly admits that he picked up when touring around Europe rather than from his own country.

== Reception ==
Rob Miller, writing in the Pop Topic, described the album as "...a haunting and cinematic piece of art," and "Good's strongest solo record to date." Jenny Aquino, writing in "Exclaim", said that; "While the sheer number of sombre songs make it a rather dreary listen, its thought-provoking lyrics make it worthwhile..."

== Tracklisting ==
No.	Title	Length
1.	"One of Them Years"	4:57
2.	"A Momentary Truth"	3:07
3.	"Beauty"	5:32
4.	"Sicily"	3:57
5.	"Boobytrapped"	4:18
6.	"Radicals"	4:34
7.	"Dreading it"	6:09
8.	"Your Rainy Sound"	2:52
9.	"Fingernails"	3:15
10.	"Lumière Noire"	4:33
11.	"A Thousand Tons"	3:35
12.	"The Heights"	4:22
13.	"Selling You My Heart"	3:39
14.	"Thorn Bird"	5:06
15.	"Parts"	5:00

== Personnel ==
- Matthew Good - vocals, acoustic guitars, synth, electric guitar
- Blake Manning - drums, percussion, backing vocals
- Peter Fusco - bass
- Stuart Cameron - electric guitar, 12 string acoustic guitar, lap steel, pedal steel
- Warne Livesey - piano, omnichord, harmonium, organ, Moog bass, mellotron
- Timothy Dawson - double bass
- Terry Townson - trumpet, flugelhorn
- Elizabeth Good - acoustic guitar on Dreading it
- Andée Leclerc - backing vocals
- Hayley Mather - backing vocals

== Charts ==
Chart (2020)	Peak position
Canadian Albums (Billboard)	49
