= Michael Stephens =

Michael or Mike Stephens may refer to:

- Michael Stephens (cricketer) (born 1967), New Zealand cricketer
- Michael Stephens (soccer) (born 1989), American soccer player for Chicago Fire
- Mike Stephens (director) (fl. 1970s–2000s), British TV producer and director
- Mike Stephens (politician) (fl. 2010s–2020s), member of the Missouri House of Representatives

== See also ==
- Michael Stevens (disambiguation)
- Maurice Michael Stephens (1919–2004), fighter ace with No. 3 Squadron RAF in World War Two
