= David Burke (politician) =

American politician

David E. Burke
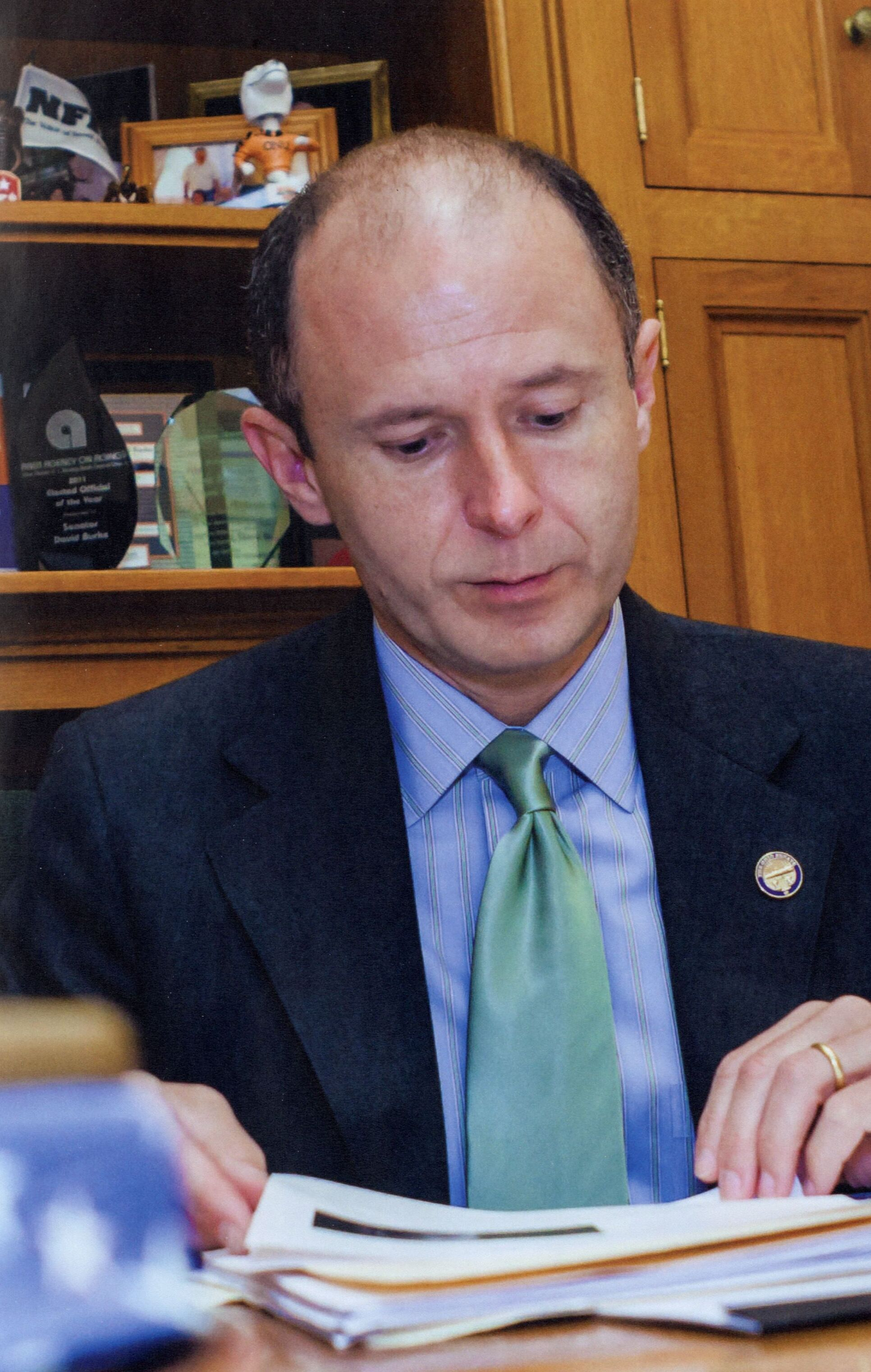

Member of the Ohio Senate from the 26th district
- In office July 13, 2011 – December 31, 2020
- Preceded by: Karen Gillmor
- Succeeded by: Bill Reineke

Member of the Ohio House of Representatives from the 83rd district
- In office January 5, 2009 – July 13, 2011
- Preceded by: Tony Core
- Succeeded by: Dorothy Pelanda

Personal details
- Born: July 26, 1967 (age 59) Cincinnati, Ohio, U.S.
- Party: Republican
- Education: Ohio Northern University (B.S.) Capital University (M.B.A.)
- Profession: Pharmacist

David E. Burke (born July 26, 1967) is a politician who served as State Senator for the 26th District of the Ohio Senate. He formerly served in the Ohio House of Representatives. He served as the Chairman of the Senate Finance Medicaid subcommittee.

== Life and career ==
Burke received his bachelor's degree in pharmacy from Ohio Northern University and his master's degree in Business Administration from Capital University. Burke owned Dave's Pharmacy in Marysville, Ohio from 1997 through 2020, and served on Marysville City Council from 2004 to 2008. Burke served in the Ohio House of Representatives from 2009 to 2011, and has served in the Ohio Senate from 2011 through 2020. He currently serves as a Union County Commissioner.

Dave is married, has two children, and lives in Marysville, Ohio.

=== Legislation ===
Having served in both chambers of Ohio's legislature, Burke has played a leading role in many reforms. Burke has been Chairman of the Senate Finance Subcommittee on Health and Medicaid, and in that role has been charged with crafting health policy and funding in the state's budget.

In 2010, Ohio was facing a crisis of prescription drug abuse. HB 93 - The Pill Mill Bill was sponsored by Representative Burke to increase accountability on the medical community by putting a stop to "pill mills". These pill mills were over vastly dispensing drugs such as OxyContin, Percocet, and Vicodin. The bill also created greater reporting requirements for medical professionals and provided tools to local law enforcement to combat the issue.

In 2013, Burke sponsored SB 206, creating The Joint Medicaid Oversight Committee (JMOC).The committee consists of five State Senators and five State Representatives, Burke currently serves as chairman. The committee provides General Assembly oversight to Medicaid operations, policy, and funding in the state. The committee meets regularly to hear from Medicaid state agencies and stakeholders to evaluate the various programs.

== Ohio House of Representatives ==
With incumbent Tony Core unable to run for another term in the Ohio House of Representative, Burke was one of three Republicans who sought to replace him, along with Jack Reser and Cameron Wesselbeck. In the end, Burke won the nomination with 46.78% of the electorate, only 400 votes more than Reser. He ran unopposed in the general election, ensuring him a seat at the Statehouse. In 2010, Burke again ran unopposed.

In the 129th General Assembly, Speaker of the House William G. Batchelder had named Burke as a member of the Republican majority caucus' Policy Committee.

== Ohio Senate ==
With Senator Karen Gillmor resigning from her seat in 2011, Burke had been named as a possible successor. Up against ten others who were vying for the seat, Burke was seen as one of the favorites to obtain the seat.

Ultimately, it was announced by Tom Niehaus that Burke would indeed be appointed to fill the vacancy. He was sworn into office on July 13, 2011. Burke successfully ran for a full term to his seat in 2012, defeating Democrat Tanyce Addison 61% to 39%. Burke was reelected in 2016.

=== Committee assignments ===
- Finance Committee
- Health, Human Services and Medicaid Committee (chair)
- Insurance and Financial Institutions Committee
- Public Utilities Committee
- Rules and Reference Committee

== Electoral history ==
Election results
Year	Office	Election	Votes for Burke	%	Opponent	Party	Votes	%
2003	Marysville City Council	General	482	72%	Ken Kraus	Democrat	192	28%
2008	Ohio House of Representatives	General	22,490	100%				
2010	Ohio House of Representatives	General	32,518	100%				
2012	Ohio Senate	General	86,055	60%	Tancye Addison	Democrat	56,741	40%
2016	Ohio Senate	General	109,616	100%				
