= David J. Robinson =

American politician

David Robinson

Member of the Ohio House of Representatives from the 27th district
- In office December 8, 1999-September 12, 2000
- Preceded by: E. J. Thomas
- Succeeded by: Jim Hughes

Personal details
- Party: Republican

David J. Robinson is a former member of the Ohio House of Representatives. He was appointed to his position when the previous representative, E. J. Thomas, resigned; in turn, when Robinson lost the Republican primary election to Jim Hughes, he resigned so that Hughes could be appointed to his seat and run as an incumbent.

While in office, Robinson was the sponsor of noise-reduction legislation for trains.
