= Something Like a Storm =

2017 studio album by Matthew Good

Studio album by Matthew Good
- Released: October 20, 2017
- Genre: Alternative rock
- Length: 43:24
- Label: Warner Music Canada
- Producer: Warne Livesey

Matthew Good chronology
Chaotic Neutral (2015)	Something Like a Storm (2017)	Moving Walls (2020)

Singles from Something Like a Storm
- 1. "Decades" Released: July 14, 2017

Something Like a Storm is the eighth solo album by Matthew Good. The first song released from the album was "Bad Guys Win", which was released on April 21, 2017, with an accompanying music video. On July 14, Good released the lead single off the album, "Decades", which was accompanied by a music video. The album was released on October 20, 2017.

== Track listing ==
No.	Title	Length
1.	"Bad Guys Win"	4:24
2.	"Decades"	3:40
3.	"Men at the Door"	4:55
4.	"There the First Time"	4:49
5.	"Days Come Down"	4:09
6.	"Something Like a Storm"	5:55
7.	"She's Got You Where She Wants You"	4:11
8.	"This Is Night"	4:58
9.	"Bullets in a Briefcase"	6:23

== Charts ==
Chart (2017)	Peak position
Canadian Albums (Billboard)	14
