= John Patrick Carney =

American politician

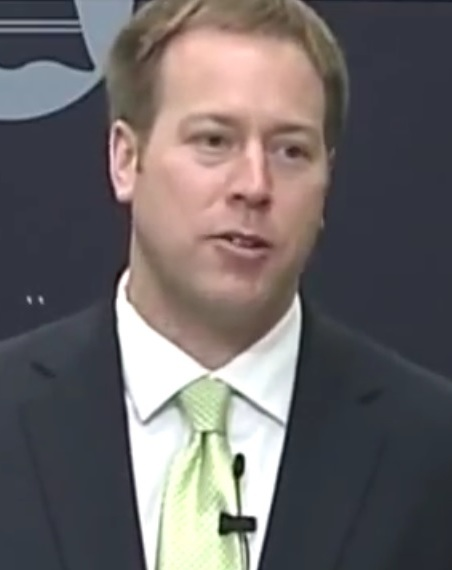

Member of the Ohio House of Representatives from the 22nd district
- In office January 5, 2009 – December 31, 2014
- Preceded by: Jim Hughes
- Succeeded by: David J. Leland

Personal details
- Born: March 28, 1976 (age 50) Cleveland, Ohio, U.S.
- Party: Democratic
- Education: Ohio State University (JD)
- Profession: Attorney

John Patrick Carney (born March 28, 1976) is an American attorney and former Democratic member of the Ohio House of Representatives, representing the 22nd District from 2009 to 2014. In September 2013, Carney announced his intention to run for Auditor of the State of Ohio in the 2014 election, he lost the general election on November 4 to incumbent Dave Yost.

== Life and career ==
Carney is the eleventh of twelve children and has lived his entire life in Ohio. In 1998 he received his undergraduate degree from Ohio State University and in 2001 he received a J.D. from the same school. He has a wife, Jennifer, and two young daughters. He is a health care attorney and currently is employed at Porter, Wright, Morris and Arthur Limited Liability Partnership.

== Ohio House of Representatives ==
Carney first decided to run for the Ohio House in 2006 when the 22nd District was first considered a potential pick-up for Democrats. Carney ended up losing to incumbent Jim Hughes by about 3,000 votes.

With his strong showing in 2006, Carney decided to run again in 2008. This time, however, Hughes was out of the race. After facing no opposition in the primary, Carney went on to face insurance agent Michael Keenan in the general election. This time around, Carney was the focus of many negative attack ads. In the end, Carney proved victorious the second time around, besting Keenan by 8,500 votes.

In his freshman term, Speaker of the House Armond Budish appointed Carney to Finance and Appropriations, including the Subcommittee on Transportation and Justice, as well as the Health, Insurance, and Transportation and Infrastructure Committees.

In 2010, Carney ran for reelection against Republican Angel Rhodes, Libertarian Mark Noble and Corey Ansel of the Party for Socialism and Liberation. He went on to beat Rhodes by about 3,500 votes. Currently, he serves as ranking member of the Insurance Committee, and as a member of the Finance and Appropriations Committee and the Transportation Subcommittee, and the Health and Aging Committee. He is also a member of the Joint Committee on Agency Rule Review, and the Joint Legislative Committee on Medicaid Technology and Reform.

Carney won a third term in 2012 with 67.73% of the vote over Republican Andy Hall.

== Policies, positions and initiatives ==
Carney has become a vocal opponent in regards to Representative Matt Huffman's plan to phase out the state's insurance-verification program, sends about 5,400 letters each week to random Ohio drivers asking them to mail back proof of vehicle insurance.

He has also been critical of Governor of Ohio John Kasich's plan to privatize the Ohio Department of Development, acknowledging the lack of disclosure such an initiative brings. He has also acknowledged that the Legislative Service Commission confirmed that the bill would allow JobsOhio to spend DOD funding without Controlling Board approval or seeking further approval from the legislature.

Carney is against Kasich's biennium budget plan, and has stated that he believes the cuts made to local government will lead to an increase in local property taxes. He also has pointed out potential difficulties that he claims the budget brings to public schools, and is in favor of providing any relief possible to the cuts proposed.

== Candidacy for Ohio State Auditor ==
On September 10, 2013, Carney announced his candidacy for Auditor of the State of Ohio in the 2014 election, challenging Republican Dave Yost. Carney was defeated on November 4, 2014, by the incumbent Yost, who received 57% of the vote.

Ohio House of Representatives
Preceded by Jim Hughes	Member of the Ohio House of Representatives from the 22nd district January 5, 2009 – December 31, 2014	Succeeded by David Leland
Party political offices
Preceded by David Pepper	Democratic nominee for Auditor of Ohio; 2014	Succeeded by Zack Space
