= Evelyn Lundberg Stratton =

American judge (born 1953)

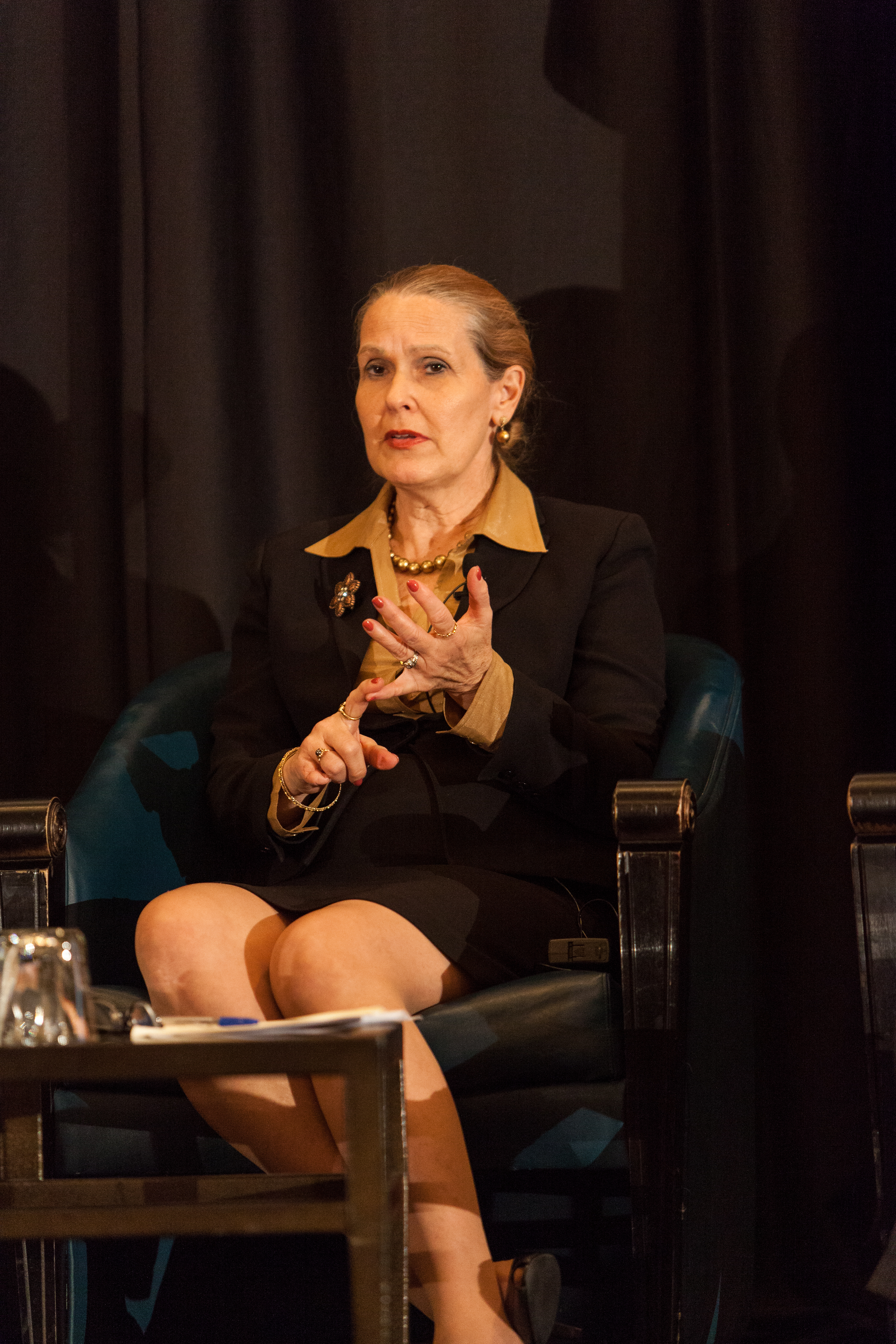

Justice of the Ohio Supreme Court
- In office 1996 – December 31, 2012
- Appointed by: George Voinovich
- Preceded by: J. Craig Wright
- Succeeded by: Judith L. French

Personal details
- Born: February 25, 1953 (age 73) Bangkok, Thailand
- Spouse: John A. Lundberg III

Evelyn Lundberg Stratton (born February 25, 1953) is an American jurist. She was a justice of the Ohio Supreme Court and is now an attorney with Vorys, Sater, Seymour and Pease.

== Background and education ==
Evelyn Lundberg Stratton was born to missionary parents in Bangkok, Thailand on February 25, 1953. She attended missionary boarding schools in South Vietnam and Malaysia and graduated from the Dalat School in Tanah Rata, Malaysia in 1971. Lundberg received her associate degree from the University of Florida in 1973. She then went on to graduate from the University of Akron, Akron, Ohio, in 1976. She received a J.D. degree from Ohio State University College of Law in 1979.

== Experience ==
Stratton has decades of trial and appellate experience. She spent the first nine years of her legal career as a central Ohio trial lawyer. In 1988, she became the first woman elected judge of the Franklin County Common Pleas Court. Stratton was appointed to the Ohio Supreme Court by Governor George Voinovich in 1996 and was elected by Ohio voters to three six-year terms. She retired from the Ohio Supreme Court at the end of 2012. In January 2013, she joined Vorys, Sater, Seymour and Pease LLP as of counsel in the firm's Columbus office. In this role, Stratton counsels clients on variety of practice areas, including health care, litigation and appellate work. She also assists Vorys Health Care Advisors, a wholly owned subsidiary of the firm that helps health care providers, business decision makers, professional associations and other stakeholders deal with the challenges of a complex, rapidly changing state and federal health care environment.

== Supreme Court of Ohio ==
In 1996, Ohio Governor George Voinovich appointed Stratton to fill the term of Justice Craig Wright on the Supreme Court of Ohio. Stratton was elected to a 6-year term in November 1996 and re-elected in 2002. In 2008, she was reelected with 63% of the vote against Democrat Peter Sikora.

Stratton announced in May 2012 that she would retire at the end of 2012. Governor John Kasich appointed Ohio Tenth District Court of Appeals Judge Judith L. French to succeed Stratton upon her retirement.

== Recognition ==
Stratton's work has resulted in many honors, such as the Congressional Coalition on Adoption's Angels Award, the U.S. Department of Health & Human Services' Adoption Excellence Award and the Ohio State Association of Veterans' Service Commissions Outstanding Service Award. In May 2008, she received the prestigious Ellis Island Medal of Honor for her work on mental health courts and adoption reforms.
