= Michael Schwarzwalder =

American politician

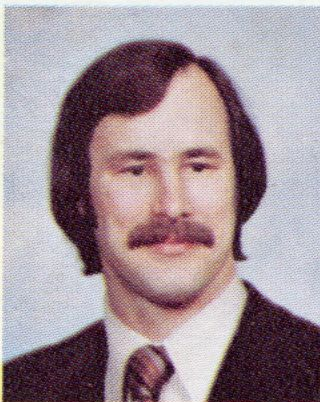

Member of the Ohio Senate from the 16th district
- In office January 3, 1977 – December 31, 1984
- Preceded by: Donald L. Woodland
- Succeeded by: Eugene J. Watts

Personal details
- Born: October 30, 1943 San Diego, California
- Died: June 24, 2013 (aged 69) Columbus, Ohio
- Party: Democratic

Alan Michael Schwarzwalder (October 30, 1943 – June 24, 2013) was a member of the Ohio Senate, serving the 16th district which encompassed the western portions of Columbus, Ohio. He was a member of the Democratic Party.

Schwarzwalder was elected to the Ohio Senate in 1976 after defeating incumbent Donald L. Woodland in the Democratic primary. He won re-election in 1980 against Republican Fred L. Morrison. He lost his seat in 1984 to Republican Eugene J. Watts.
