= Stephanie Kunze =

American politician

Member of the Ohio Senate from the 16th district
- In office January 3, 2017 – December 31, 2024
- Preceded by: Jim Hughes
- Succeeded by: Beth Liston

Member of the Ohio House of Representatives from the 24th district
- In office January 3, 2013 – December 31, 2016
- Preceded by: Ted Celeste
- Succeeded by: Jim Hughes

Personal details
- Born: Stephanie Moyer
- Party: Republican
- Spouse: Matt Kunze
- Children: 2
- Education: Indiana University, Bloomington (BA)

Stephanie Kunze is an American politician who served as a member of the Ohio Senate for the 16th district. She formerly served in the Ohio House of Representatives for the 24th district. Prior to her election, she was a member of Hilliard City Council and a secretary at Norwich Elementary School.

== Career ==
In her 2009 race for Hilliard City Council, Kunze faced controversy over an apparent violation of Ohio law that prohibits classified public employees from participating in partisan primary elections. She resigned her position with the school district after winning the Republican primary.

She was elected to the Ohio House of Representatives in 2012, defeating Democrat Maureen Reedy with 52% of the vote. Kunze's 2012 campaign was aided by school privatization and charter school advocacy group StudentsFirst, who sent mailers and distributed literature on her behalf.

Kunze ran for re-election as a state representative in 2014, facing opposition from Democrat Kathy Hoff and Libertarian Mark M. Noble. In 2016, Kunze opted to run for the Ohio Senate, winning with 58% of the vote.

== Personal life ==
She is married with two children.

== Electoral history ==
Ohio House 24th District
Year	Republican	Votes	Pct	Democrat	Votes	Pct
2012	Stephanie Kunze	32,630	51.86%	Maureen Reedy	30,197	48.00%
2014	Stephanie Kunze	22,866	57.23%	Kathy Hoff	15,058	37.69%

Ohio Senate 16th District
Year	Republican	Votes	Pct	Democrat	Votes	Pct
2016	Stephanie Kunze	109,454	58.99%	Cathy Johnson	76,077	41.01%
2020	Stephanie Kunze	106,053	50.03%	Crystal Lett	105,937	49.97%
