= Ed Core =

American politician

Member of the Ohio House of Representatives from the 87th district
- In office January 3, 1991-August 9, 1999
- Preceded by: Rodney Hughes
- Succeeded by: Tony Core

Personal details
- Party: Republican

Edward Core, commonly called Ed Core, was an American politician from Ohio and a Republican member of the Ohio General Assembly representing district 87. Core died of a heart attack on August 9, 1999, and his son Tony was appointed to his seat.

Core died suddenly after being stricken behind the wheel of his car. He was 65 years old. He had specialized in transportation budget issues as a legislator. Before being elected to the Ohio General Assembly in 1990, he had been a high school teacher and principal, and a Logan County commissioner.
