= Chaotic Neutral (album) =

2015 studio album by Matthew Good

Studio album by Matthew Good
- Released: September 25, 2015
- Studios: Noble Street Studios (Toronto, Ontario)
- Genre: Alternative rock
- Length: 51:33
- Label: Warner Music Canada
- Producer: Warne Livesey

Matthew Good chronology
| Arrows of Desire (2013) | Chaotic Neutral (2015) | Something Like a Storm (2017) |

Singles from Chaotic Neutral
- 1. "All You Sons And Daughters" Released: July 16, 2015; 2. "No Liars" Released: 2016

Chaotic Neutral is the seventh solo album by Matthew Good. The album was nominated for "Rock Album of the Year" at the 2016 Juno Awards.

== Track listing ==
All songs written by Matthew Good except "Cloudbusting", written by Kate Bush.

| No. | Title | Length |
|---|---|---|
| 1. | "All You Sons and Daughters" | 4:02 |
| 2. | "Moment" | 4:08 |
| 3. | "Kid Down the Well" | 4:26 |
| 4. | "No Liars" | 3:54 |
| 5. | "Harridan" | 5:47 |
| 6. | "Tiger by the Tail" | 5:42 |
| 7. | "Girls in Black" | 4:38 |
| 8. | "Cloudbusting" (featuring Holly McNarland) | 4:10 |
| 9. | "Cold Water" | 5:27 |
| 10. | "Army of Lions" | 4:10 |
| 11. | "Los Alamos" | 5:09 |

== Charts ==
| Chart (2015) | Peak position |
|---|---|
| Canadian Albums (Billboard) | 12 |

== Credits ==
- Art direction – Derek Broad, Matthew Good
- Design – Derek Broad
- Second engineer – Joel Livesey
- Mastered by Andy Vandette
- Mixed by Warne Livesey
- Producer – Warne Livesey
