= Judith L. French =

American judge (born 1962)

Judi French

Director of the Ohio Department of Insurance
- Incumbent
- Assumed office February 8, 2021
- Appointed by: Mike DeWine
- Preceded by: Tynesia Dorsey (acting)

Justice of the Ohio Supreme Court
- In office January 1, 2013 – January 2, 2021
- Appointed by: John Kasich
- Preceded by: Evelyn Lundberg Stratton
- Succeeded by: Jennifer Brunner

Judge of the Ohio Court of Appeals for the 10th District
- In office September 2004 – December 2012
- Appointed by: Bob Taft
- Preceded by: Michael H. Watson
- Succeeded by: Amy O'Grady

Personal details
- Born: August 22, 1962 (age 64) Sebring, Ohio
- Party: Republican
- Spouse: Ed Skeens
- Children: 2
- Education: Ohio State University; Moritz College of Law

Judith L. “Judi” French (born August 22, 1962) is an American jurist. She was appointed to the Ohio Supreme Court by Governor John Kasich, to replace Evelyn Lundberg Stratton, who resigned. A graduate of The Ohio State University, she previously served as a judge of the Ohio Tenth District Court of Appeals. She lost re-election in 2020 to Democratic appeals court judge Jennifer Brunner.

== Education ==
French graduated from Ohio State University in 1984 with a bachelor's degree in political science. In 1988 she earned a master's degree in history (Military History & Strategic Studies) from the same university, and Juris Doctor, cum laude, from The Ohio State University College of Law, now known as the Moritz College of Law.

== Legal career ==
- French was an associate for Porter, Wright, Morris & Arthur from 1988 to 1992 and was associate counsel to Steelcase in Grand Rapids, Michigan from 1992 to 1993.
- In 1993 French became deputy director for Legal Affairs at the Ohio Environmental Protection Agency. She managed a 25-attorney office.
- In 1997 French became Section Chief, and later Chief Counsel for Ohio Attorney General Betty Montgomery. She argued the state's case before the United States Supreme Court in Whitman v. American Trucking Associations, Inc. (2001), and Zelman v. Simmons-Harris (2002), a landmark case, where the court upheld the constitutionality of a school voucher system in Cleveland, Ohio by 5–4.
- From 2002 to 2004, French was Chief Legal Counsel to Governor Bob Taft.
- In late September, 2004, Taft appointed French to a seat on the Ohio Tenth District Court of Appeals vacated when Michael H. Watson was appointed to the United States District Court for the Southern District of Ohio. She won election to a six-year terms in November, 2004, and again in November 2010.

== Supreme Court of Ohio service ==
In May, 2012, Ohio Supreme Court Justice Evelyn Lundberg Stratton announced she would retire at the end of 2012. On December 20, 2012, Ohio Governor John Kasich appointed French to Stratton's unexpired term, which ran through January 1, 2015, effective January 1, 2013. No replacement was announced that day for French on the appeals court. French ran for election in 2014. During a campaign rally, French stated that she would serve as a "backstop" to the decisions of GOP officeholders. French later defended her remarks, arguing that they did not violate the Ohio Code of Judicial Conduct, which states that judicial candidates have a special obligation to ensure that the judicial system is viewed as nonpartisan.

== Ohio Insurance Director tenure ==
French was appointed to be Director of the Ohio Department of Insurance by Governor Mike DeWine following the expiration of her term as a Supreme Court Justice.

== Personal ==
Judith L. French is a Republican, and 50 years old at the time of her appointment. She is a resident of Grandview Heights, Ohio, and is a native of Sebring, Ohio. She is married to Franklin County Common Pleas Magistrate Ed Skeens, and has two children.

== Notes ==
Legal offices
Preceded by Evelyn Lundberg Stratton	Justice of the Ohio Supreme Court; 2013–2021	Succeeded by Jennifer Brunner
