= Priscilla Mead =

American politician (born 1944)

Member of the Ohio Senate from the 16th district
- In office January 3, 2001-December 31, 2002
- Preceded by: Eugene J. Watts
- Succeeded by: Steve Stivers

Member of the Ohio House of Representatives from the 28th district
- In office January 3, 1993-December 31, 1998
- Preceded by: Richard Cordray
- Succeeded by: Geoffrey C. Smith

Personal details
- Born: February 7, 1944 (age 82) Columbus, Ohio
- Party: Republican

Priscilla D. Mead (born February 7, 1944) was a member of the Ohio Senate from 2001 to 2002. She was succeeded in office by Steve Stivers and was preceded by Eugene Watts. Prior to this, she served in the Ohio House of Representatives from 1993 to 2001 where she was Chairman of the House Public Utilities Committee. She was a member of Upper Arlington City Council from 1982 to 1990 and served as president of council/mayor from 1986 to 1990.
