= Donald L. Woodland =

American politician

Member of the Ohio Senate from the 16th district
- In office January 3, 1973-December 31, 1976
- Preceded by: Robert Shaw
- Succeeded by: Michael Schwarzwalder

Personal details
- Born: 23 May 1930
- Died: 15 January 1994 (aged 63)
- Party: Democratic

Donald L. Woodland (23 May 1930 – 15 January 1994) is a former member of the Ohio Senate. He served the 16th District, which encompassed portions of Franklin County. He served from 1973 to 1976, and was succeeded by Michael Schwarzwalder.
