= Mick Stevens =

British musician (1953–1987)

Mick Stevens (1953 – 1987) was born in Chelmsford, England. He was an English musician, guitar player, singer, and songwriter. Mainly a solo artist, he also played in a number of bands and toured in the late 1970s with Richard and Linda Thompson, the Albion Band, and June Tabor. He produced four solo LPs – the first two, See the Morning (1972) and No Savage Word (1975), now collector's items, were pressed privately on the Deroy label. After lapsing into almost total obscurity they were re-released in 2004 to some critical acclaim. The latter two albums, The River and The Englishman, were re-released in late 2005 (USA and Europe) and early 2006 (UK). Lady Sunrise, recorded in 1972 but previously unissued, was released on heavyweight vinyl in spring 2007.
