= Tony Core =

American politician

Member of the Ohio House of Representatives from the 83rd district
- In office September 15, 1999-December 31, 2008
- Preceded by: Ed Core
- Succeeded by: David Burke

Personal details
- Born: March 20, 1964 (age 62) Columbus, Ohio
- Party: Republican
- Education: Ohio State University
- Profession: Attorney

Anthony Core (born March 20, 1964), commonly called Tony Core, is an American politician from Ohio and a former Republican member of the Ohio General Assembly. A graduate of Ohio State University with degrees in agricultural economics and law, he is a lawyer from rural Rushsylvania in Logan County.

== Government career ==
Core first entered government service in Logan County, where he was a member of the county's MR/DD (mental retardation/developmental disability) board. In 1999, he was appointed to fill the empty seat for the 83rd District of the House of Representatives, which includes part or all of Logan, Marion, and Union counties; the seat had been vacated by the death of its previous occupant, Tony's father Ed. After finishing the partial term, he was re-elected to four full terms before being term-limited in 2008. His seat was filled by Dave Burke of Marysville.

Core won an uncontested race for Logan County Commissioner in 2008.

During his time in the state legislature, Core used a logo of an apple eaten to the core.

== Personal ==
According to Core's website, he and his wife Heather are the parents of a son and two daughters. He is a member of the First United Presbyterian Church of Bellefontaine.
