= James B. Hughes =

American politician

James Bibb Hughes
- James Bibb Hughes Portrait
- Born: October 12, 1805; Prince Edward County, Virginia
- Died: August 11, 1873 (aged 67); Hudson, Wisconsin
- Resting place: Willow River Cemetery
- Known for: Newspaper, Politics, Abolition
- Spouse: Elizabeth Mather
- Children: 12

James Bibb Hughes (October 12, 1805 – August 11, 1873) was an American newsman, politician, and abolitionist.

== Early life and education ==
James was born October 12, 1805, in Prince Edward County, Virginia to Simon Hughes and Betsy Colman Bigger. He was raised just outside Farmville near Hampden-Sydney. He studied at Hampden-Sydney College as a youth until he moved to Richmond where he studied law under the guidance of William Wirt, the ninth US Attorney General.

== Ohio and Minnesota ==
He moved to Jackson County, Ohio in 1835 until 1849, publishing successively the Jackson Standard and the Meigs County Telegram, both Whig papers. He also served in the Ohio House of Representatives in 1836 - 1838, and served as Colonel in the local militia. He met and married Elizabeth Mather in Jackson County, Ohio, September 4, 1838. Elizabeth was born in Brooklyn, Connecticut April 27, 1816. She was the daughter of Eleazer Mather and L. Williams and a direct descendant of Rev. Richard Mather.

A book published about the history of Jackson County, Ohio lists him along with his brother in-law William Mather as one of the three most important individuals to come from the county. The book also lists James as the first Governor of Minnesota which is inaccurate. He was actually sent to St. Paul, Minnesota in 1849 as a Whig agent by President Zachary Taylor. He brought with him the first printing press and outfit in that city, and established the Minnesota Chronicle, which subsequently united with the Register; the first number bears the date June 1, 1849. In November of the same year he sold his interest in the Chronicle and Register and removed to Hudson, Wisconsin where he established the St. Croix Banner the first paper printed and issued in the St. Croix valley.

== Wisconsin ==
While living in Hudson, Wisconsin he raised his family of 12 children with his wife and ran the newspaper until a fire destroyed everything. In 1851 he was picked to join the Whig Ticket as Lieutenant Governor and lost in a close election. As an attorney in Wisconsin he practiced law at State and Federal Courts, and once he presented a case in front of the U.S Supreme Court. Four of his sons (Eleazer, George R., James, and Edwin) served in the Union Army during the Civil War.

On August 11, 1873, James Hughes died of natural causes. His legacy still lives on in the Hudson Star-Observer newspaper according to editor and historian Willis Miller.

== Sources ==
- http://politicalgraveyard.com/bio/hughes.html#01F0GAUHF
- http://apps.ohiohistory.org/ondp/index.php/Jackson_Standard
- Book: Mid-West Pioneers: Fifty Years in the Northwest

Col. James Hughes Pages (CHAPTER VI. page 146, HUDSON CITY. page 155, BIOGRAPHICAL. page 165)
