= Arrows of Desire =

2013 studio album by Matthew Good

Studio album by Matthew Good
- Released: September 24, 2013
- Genre: Alternative rock
- Length: 42:35
- Label: Frostbyte Media Inc.
- Producer: Matthew Good

Matthew Good chronology
Lights of Endangered Species (2011)	Arrows of Desire (2013)	Chaotic Neutral (2015)

Singles from Arrows of Desire
- 1. "Had It Coming" Released: May 27, 2013; 2. "Arrows of Desire" Released: September 4, 2013

Arrows of Desire is the sixth solo album by Matthew Good, released in 2013. The album's lead single, "Had It Coming", was released on May 27, 2013. The album was nominated for "Rock Album of the Year" at the 2014 Juno Awards.

Professional ratings
Review scores
Source	Rating
Allmusic	3/5 stars

== Commercial performance ==
The album debuted at #6 on the Canadian Albums Chart, selling 4,900 copies in its first week. It is Good's only album that has charted in the United States, reaching #46 on the Billboard Top Heatseekers chart.

== Inspiration ==
In an interview with The Huffington Post, Good stated that inspiration for Arrows of Desire came from the rock bands that he listened to in his youth. Good specifically mentions The Pixies and Afghan Whigs as key influences when he was writing songs for the record.

== Track listing ==
All songs written by Matthew Good.

No.	Title	Length
1.	"Arrows of Desire"	4:06
2.	"Via Dolorosa"	4:02
3.	"Had It Coming"	2:40
4.	"We're Long Gone"	2:09
5.	"So Close"	3:42
6.	"Garden of Knives"	5:29
7.	"Mutineering"	5:05
8.	"Hey Hell Heaven"	3:51
9.	"Guns of Carolina"	4:42
10.	"Letters In Wartime"	6:45

== Personnel ==
- Matthew Good - guitar, vocals
- Don Mills - bass
- Jimmy Reid - lead guitar
- Anthony Wright - piano, keyboards
- Pat Steward - drums
- Joel Livesey - recording engineer
