= Robert Shaw (Ohio politician) =

American lawyer and politician

Robert Ross Shaw, Jr.

Member of the Ohio Senate from the 16th district
- In office January 3, 1967 – December 31, 1972
- Succeeded by: Donald L. Woodland

Personal details
- Born: December 5, 1904
- Died: March 27, 1985 (aged 80) Columbus, Ohio, United States
- Party: Republican

Robert Ross Shaw, Jr. (December 5, 1904 – March 27, 1985) was a prominent lawyer in Columbus, Ohio, and a member of the Ohio Senate from 1967 to 1972.

== Political career ==
He served the 16th Senate District, which encompasses most of the western portion of Franklin County, Ohio. Senator Shaw was born on December 5, 1904, the first son of Robert Ross Shaw, Sr. and Euphemia Duncan "Effie" Harrington. He graduated from Ohio State University Moritz College of Law in 1929. Upon opening his private legal practice, he married Elsie Melvilla Murray, also of Columbus, in St. Mary's, West Virginia on September 28, 1931. Among his duties during his tenure in the legislature, he was Chairman of the Senate Finance Committee. In 1972, Senator Shaw was instrumental in the introduction and passage of Senate Bill SB 176, which provided for the licensing and regulation of professional psychologists within the State of Ohio.

== Retirement ==
He retired from the Senate later that year, following the death of his wife, Elsie, and was succeeded by Donald L. Woodland. During his subsequent retirement, he married his childhood sweetheart, Mabel Damsel, in Columbus on May 16, 1980. Senator Shaw died in Columbus on March 27, 1985, and was buried in Union Cemetery.
