= Eugene J. Watts =

American politician

Eugene Watts
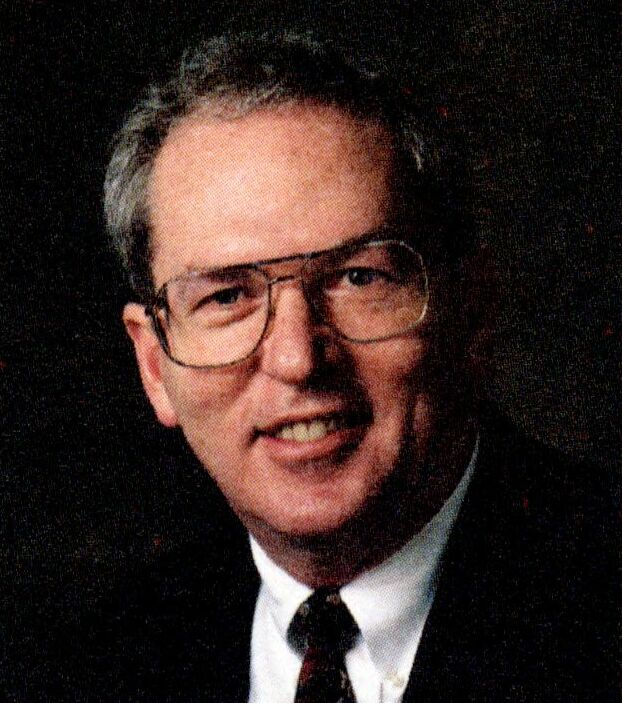

Member of the Ohio Senate from the 16th district
- In office January 3, 1985 – December 31, 2000
- Preceded by: Michael Schwarzwalder
- Succeeded by: Priscilla Mead

Personal details
- Born: October 17, 1942 St. Louis, Missouri
- Died: November 11, 2008 (aged 66) Columbus, Ohio
- Party: Republican

Eugene J. Watts (October 17, 1942 – November 11, 2008) was a member of the Ohio Senate, United States, serving the 16th district. His district encompassed the western portions of Columbus, Ohio. In 2000, he faced term limits, and was succeeded by Priscilla D. Mead. He was a Professor Emeritus of History at Ohio State University. He served in the Army during the Vietnam War and rose to the rank of captain and earned a Bronze Star. He completed his PhD studies at Emory University in Atlanta. During his tenure in the Ohio Senate he was an advocate for veteran affairs and education.

== Publications ==
- Watts, Eugene J. (1978). The Social Bases of City Politics. Westport, Connecticut: Greeenwood Press. ISBN 0-313-20322-9.
