= Mike Stevens (Ohio politician) =

American politician

Michael Stevens

Member of the Ohio House of Representatives from the 56th district
- In office January 11, 2000-December 31, 2000
- Preceded by: Johnnie Maier Jr.
- Succeeded by: John Hagan

Personal details
- Party: Democratic

Mike Stevens is an Ohio Democratic Party politician and a former member of the Ohio General Assembly. After Johnnie Maier Jr. resigned in 2000, House Democrats appointed Stevens to his seat. Ten months into his term, Stevens was defeated for reelection by John Hagan. In all, Stevens spent only one year in the legislature.

Following his defeat, he became active in the Stark County Democratic Party, and a Lawrence Township Trustee.
