= E. J. Thomas =

American politician

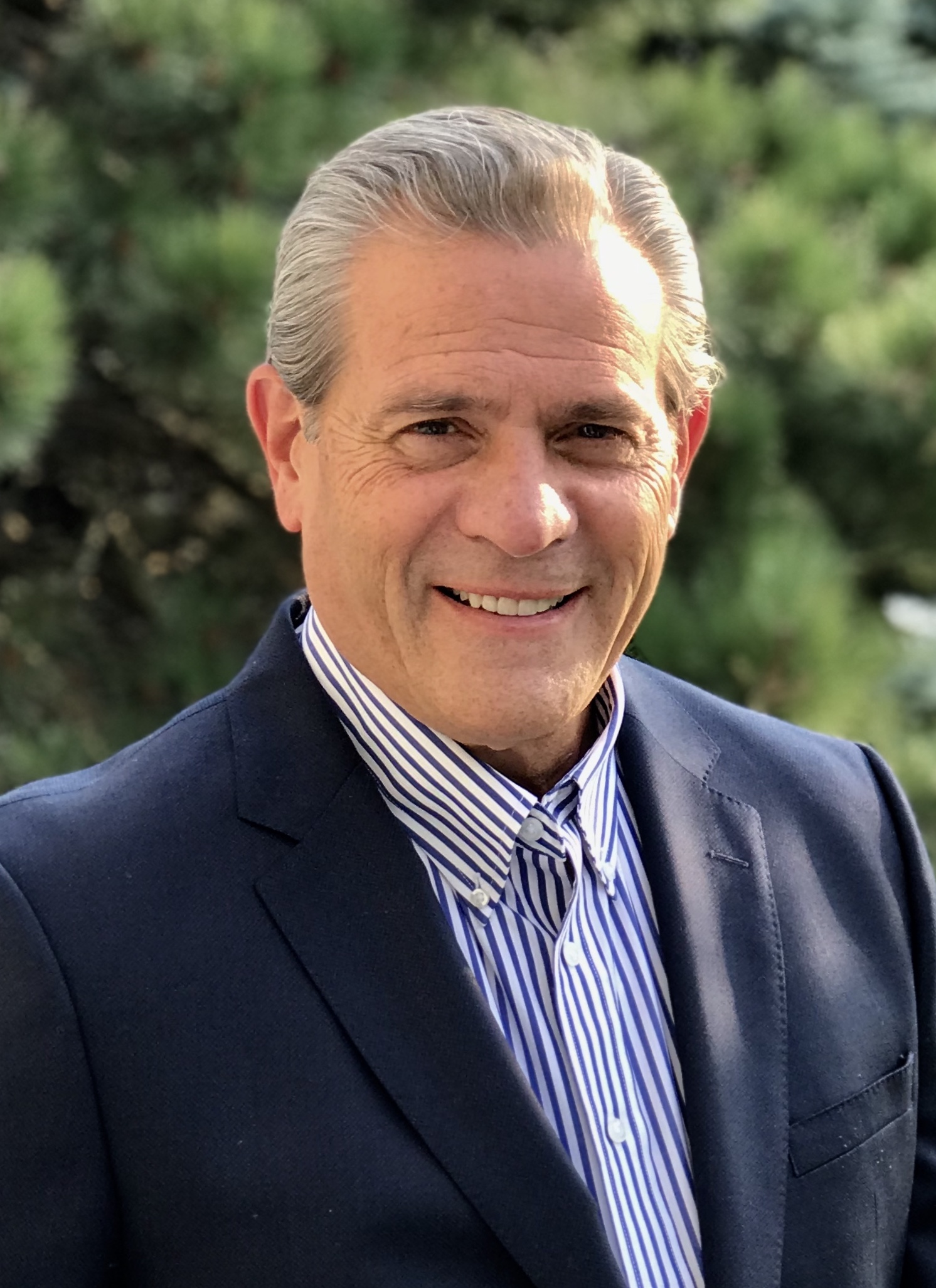
E. J. Thomas

E. J. Thomas is cofounder and Pres. & CEO of Vector Strategies, LLC, a consulting company supporting both profit and nonprofit businesses. Assuming this role follows nearly 20 years as Pres. & CEO of Habitat for Humanity - MidOhio beginning in 2004. Thomas specializes in acting as an Executive in Residence (EIR) for clients seeking to grow and expand their reach and influence, currently serving with the Foundation for Appalachian Ohio. In addition, EIR offerings include working with CEO's and C-Suite staff to better harmonize individual leadership styles within well-established organizational cultures.

At Habitat, he was responsible for oversight, operation and significantly growing the affiliate into one of the nation's top-40 Habitat affiliates in terms of the number of homes constructed. E. J. oversaw a challenging transition that resulted in the blending of Licking County Habitat and Madison County into the central Ohio service area. At the time of his departure, the organization had served more than 1,400 families that included some 300 in several African countries. During his tenure, Habitat's retail arm known as “ReStore” increased production significantly during his tenure with yearly revenue approaching $4 million in three locations. Recognized by his peers in the central Ohio business community, he was awarded CEO Magazine's, “CEO of the Year” for large non-profit organizations. E. J. was also named one of central Ohio's “Smart 50” business leaders. He is past chair of the State Support Organization of Habitat for Humanity Ohio, an organization that assists the 39 affiliates in the state by way of Statehouse advocacy efforts, and individualized training of affiliate staff in best practices, grants writing, and infrastructure acquisition.

Elevating the need for stable housing, E. J. was Founder of the Affordable Housing Alliance of Central Ohio and its former two-term chair. This organization is responsible for advocacy efforts that have, in part, been responsible for some $700 million from all sources being focused on affordable housing solutions in central Ohio.

Formerly, Thomas served as an elected member of the Habitat for Humanity International's (HFHI) U.S. Council, the body that advises HFHI staff and the International Board on the direction and priorities of U.S. programs and helps in empowering affiliates throughout the U.S. These 20 members from among the 1,100 affiliates across the country advising on all aspects of Habitat's work within the U.S., develop programs and initiatives that enhance the Habitat mission, recommend policy, and serve as a sounding board for ideas to HFHI. In this capacity he served as Chairman of its Advocacy Committee and co-chair of HFHI's Veterans Initiative Advisory Committee.

Thomas was also a former member of the Ohio House of Representatives, now known as the 22nd House District, serving a total of eight, two-year terms. He specialized in state fiscal policy, serving as chairman of both the Ways & Means and Finance & Appropriations Committees. In the latter role, he was directly responsible for legislative approval of five budgets totaling $44 billion. It is with this experience that he was at the forefront during the creation of HFHI's Government Relations & Advocacy Office in Washington, D.C.

Col. Thomas is retired from the USAF and the Ohio Air National Guard (OANG) after 32 years in the military, during which time he was an instructor pilot, Vice Commander of the 121st Air Refueling Wing and subsequently served as OANG Headquarters Director of Operations for the state's 5,000+ member force. He was credited with flying 32 missions during the first Persian Gulf War.

Thomas is past chairman of the Ohio Unemployment Compensation Review Commission, during which time he had responsibility for some 30 attorneys who remain the commission's hearing officers along with an administrative support staff of 27 professionals. Each year the commission considers 25,000+ cases brought by both employers and employees. The commission is the independent appeals forum for cases related to disputed unemployment claims.

He has been active in the central Ohio community where he served three, four-year terms as trustee on the board of Capital University and chaired the Integrity & Compliance Committee. Thomas was one of the founders and is former chair of the Franklin County Human Service Chamber. He has extensive experience on various boards such as the Columbus Zoo, the local Cancer Society, and the Columbus Symphony Orchestra (CSO). He cofounded the CSO's successful “Picnic with the Pops” summer series. He was invited to give the spring 2014 commencement address at Capital University's graduation ceremony and was conferred an Honorary Doctorate of Humane Letters. Thomas is a 2018 Ohio Veterans Hall of Fame Inductee. He was also inducted into the Ohio Senior Citizens Hall of Fame. For many years, E. J. has performed as a live auctioneer and has raised a total of more than $3M for numerous nonprofit organizations. He was married to Randi Marie Thomas (née Ostry), cofounder of Vector Strategies, an attorney and constitutional law litigator (she passed in July, 2025). E. J. is the father of three children, Edward J. Thomas, III, Alicia Layne Thomas, and Rose Victoria Thomas.
