= LA Difference: A History Unplugged =

La Difference: A History Unplugged

Studio album by 54-40
- Released: January 8, 2016
- Recorded: Blue Frog Studios
- Genre: Alternative rock
- Length: 39:54
- Label: eOne Music
- Producer: Dave Ogilvie, Dave Genn and Neil Osborne

54-40 chronology
| Lost in the City (2011) | La Difference: A History Unplugged (2016) |

La Difference: A History Unplugged is a 2016 album by Canadian alternative rock band 54•40 recorded at Blue Frog Studios in White Rock, British Columbia. The album features ten re-recording of songs in an unplugged and intimate setting with the use of additional instrumentation.

== Track listing ==
| No. | Title | Original album | Length |
|---|---|---|---|
| 1. | "Ocean Pearl" | Smilin' Buddha Cabaret | 3:25 |
| 2. | "She La" | Dear Dear | 3:58 |
| 3. | "Since When" | Since When | 5:00 |
| 4. | "One Day in Your Life" | Show Me | 4:01 |
| 5. | "Baby Ran" | 54-40 | 3:43 |
| 6. | "I Go Blind" | 54-40 | 2:42 |
| 7. | "One Gun" | Show Me | 5:05 |
| 8. | "Crossing a Canyon" | Trusted by Millions | 3:32 |
| 9. | "Casual Viewin'" | Casual Viewin' | 5:09 |
| 10. | "Lies to Me" | Trusted by Millions | 3:19 |
| Total length: | | | 39:54 |
