= Radio Love Songs: The Singles Collection =

Greatest hits album by 54-40
- Released: April 2, 2002
- Genre: Alternative rock
- Label: Columbia

54-40 chronology
Casual Viewin' USA (2001)	Radio Love Songs: The Singles Collection (2002)	Goodbye Flatland (2003)

Professional ratings
Review scores
Source	Rating
AllMusic	4/5 stars

Radio Love Songs: The Singles Collection is a 2002 greatest hits collection by Canadian rock group, 54-40. It also contains two new songs, "Love Rush" and "Plenty Emotion".

Tracks from the band's 1990s albums are all grouped together, and in reverse chronological order from 2000's Casual Viewin' to 1992's Dear Dear; each block is interspersed with one of the band's hits from their Warner Brothers (1984–1990) period re-recorded.

== Track listing ==
1. "Love Rush" – 3:23
2. "Plenty Emotion" – 3:39
3. "Unbend" – 3:51
4. "Casual Viewin'" – 4:42
5. "I Go Blind" – 2:56
6. "Since When" – 4:15
7. "Baby Ran" – 4:22
8. "Crossing a Canyon" – 3:59
9. "Lies to Me" – 3:22
10. "Love You All" – 4:29
11. "One Day in Your Life" – 4:17
12. "Blame Your Parents" – 4:27
13. "Radio Luv Song" – 2:10
14. "Assoholic" – 3:42
15. "Ocean Pearl" – 3:28
16. "One Gun" – 4:15
17. "She La" – 4:10
18. "Music Man" – 5:44
19. "Nice to Luv You" – 4:23

== Production ==
- Howard Redekopp - Producer, Engineer, Mixer on Love Rush

== Year-end charts ==
Chart (2002)	Position
Canadian Alternative Albums (Nielsen SoundScan)	121
