= Heavy Mellow =

Live album by 54-40
- Released: September 7, 1999
- Genre: Alternative rock

54-40 chronology
| Since When (1998) | Heavy Mellow (1999) | Casual Viewin' (2000) |

Heavy Mellow is a 1999 live album by Canadian rock group, 54-40.

It is a two-disc set; as its name implies, one disc contains "heavy" rock performances and the other contains "mellow" acoustic renditions. Many acoustic album versions vary greatly from their studio counterparts, due to the addition of new instruments that weren't used before (such as accordions). These tracks include "Radio Luv Song", "Crossing a Canyon", and "Miss You". In addition, the live version of "Music Man" is extended compared to the studio version. At least some tracks were recorded at the October 28th, 1998 show at the Phoenix club in Toronto.

== Track listing ==
=== Disc one ===
1. "She La"
2. "Ocean Pearl"
3. "Nice to Luv You"
4. "Lies to Me"
5. "Since When"
6. "Assoholic"
7. "Baby Ran"
8. "Music Man"
9. "Love You All"

=== Disc two ===
1. "One Gun"
2. "One Day in Your Life"
3. "Miss You"
4. "Radio Luv Song"
5. "I Go Blind"
6. "Crossing a Canyon"
7. "I Could Give You More"
8. "Laughing"
9. "She La"
10. "Ocean Pearl"
