= Casual Viewin' USA =

Compilation album by 54-40
- Released: August 14, 2001
- Genre: Alternative rock
- Label: Nettwerk

54-40 chronology
Casual Viewin' (2000)	Casual Viewin' USA (2001)	Radio Love Songs: The Singles Collection (2002)

Professional ratings
Review scores
Source	Rating
AllMusic	2/5 stars

Casual Viewin' USA is a 2001 album by Canadian rock group, 54-40.

The album was compiled by the band's American distributor, Nettwerk, as a compilation of tracks from several of the band's previous albums, including the similarly-named 2000 album "Casual Viewin'".

== Track listing ==
1. "Casual Viewin'" – 4:44
2. "Since When" – 4:19
3. "I Go Blind (Rerecorded)" – 2:56
4. "Blue Sky" – 4:02
5. "Lies to Me" – 3:19
6. "Baby Ran" – 4:24
7. "One Gun (Rerecorded)" – 4:14
8. "Ocean Pearl (Rerecorded)" – 3:46
9. "Love You All" – 4:59
10. "Nice to Luv You" – 4:22
11. "She's a Jones" – 4:25
12. "Sunday Girl" – 4:41
13. "Lost & Lazy" – 4:23

== Album Personnel ==
=== Production ===
- Howard Redekopp - engineer
