= Sweeter Things: A Compilation =

Compilation album by 54–40
- Released: October 29, 1991
- Genre: Alternative rock
- Label: Warner-Reprise
- Producer: 54•40 with Dave Ogilvie and Dave Jerden

54–40 chronology
Fight for Love (1989)	Sweeter Things: A Compilation (1991)	Dear Dear (1992)

Professional ratings
Review scores
Source	Rating
AllMusic	4.5/5 stars

Sweeter Things: A Compilation is a 1991 compilation album by 54-40. It was their final release for Warner-Reprise, and compiled tracks from their albums 54-40, Show Me and Fight for Love. The title track from 1984's Set the Fire as well as two unreleased tracks, "Sweeter Things" and "Don Quixote", are also included.

The band subsequently moved to Columbia Records for its next studio project, 1992's Dear Dear.

== Track listing ==
1. "Miss You" – 4:35
2. "Over My Head" – 3:24
3. "Laughing" – 3:51
4. "Baby Have Some Faith" – 5:50
5. "Here in My House" – 3:50
6. "Sweeter Things" – 4:05
7. "One Day in Your Life" – 4:15
8. "Get Back Down" – 4:15
9. "One Gun" – 4:16
10. "Walk in Line" – 4:23
11. "Set the Fire" – 4:49
12. "Take My Hand" – 4:34
13. "I Go Blind" – 2:47
14. "Baby Ran" – 4:33
15. "Alcohol Heart" – 4:15
16. "Me Island" – 5:14
17. "Don Quixote" – 6:01
