= Howard Redekopp =

Canadian record producer and musician

- Occupations: Musician; producer; engineer; mixer
- Instruments: Bass; keyboards; vocals
- Formerly of: Veal
- Website: howardredekopp.com

Howard Redekopp is a Canadian Juno Award-winning record producer, mixer, writer, musician, and recording engineer best known for his work with Tegan and Sara and La Gusana Ciega.

Redekopp's production work has received two Grammy Award nominations and one Latin Grammy nomination. His work has played a significant role in the careers of Canadian artists such as Mother Mother, the New Pornographers, Dear Rouge, Said the Whale, and Scenic Route to Alaska.

Redekopp is a board member of the Music BC Industry Association and the founder of the record label How Weird Sounds.

== Discography ==
- 1997: Bossanova (engineer, mixer) – Bossanova
- 1999: Tilt O'Whirl (producer, engineer, co-writer, bass, vocals) – Veal
- 2000: Casual Viewin' (engineer) – 54-40
- 2001: Casual Viewin' USA (engineer) – 54-40
- 2002: Love Rush (producer, engineer, mixer) – 54-40
- 2003: Goodbye Flatland (producer, engineer) – 54-40
- 2003: Electric Version (engineer, mixer) – The New Pornographers
- 2004: So Jealous (producer, engineer, mixer) – Tegan and Sara
- 2004: The Slow Wonder (mixer) – A.C. Newman
- 2004: Grab That Gun (engineer) – The Organ
- 2004: Three (producer, engineer, mixer) – The Spitfires
- 2004: You Know the Rules (mixer) – The Gay
- 2004: Slang X Generator (producer, engineer, mixer) – Closed Caption Radio
- 2004: Hanging the Battle-Scarred Pinata (engineer) – N.Q. Arbuckle
- 2005: Mother (producer, engineer, mixer) – Mother Mother (rereleased in 2007 as Touch Up)
- 2005: Twin Cinema (engineer) – The New Pornographers
- 2005: The Survival Issue (producer, engineer, mixer) – Swank
- 2006: Veins (producer, engineer, mixer) – The Paper Cranes
- 2006: TV Heart Attack (producer, engineer, mixer) – TV Heart Attack
- 2006: Anything (producer, engineer, mixer) – Kinnie Starr
- 2006: Gossip Diet (producer, engineer, mixer) – Lotus Child
- 2006: Hey, Sugar (mixer) – Bossanova
- 2006: underneath the radio (engineer) – Goldenboy
- 2007: It's Not Fun. Don't Do It! DVD (mixer) – Tegan and Sara
- 2007: Diaries of a Broken Heart (producer, engineer, mixer) – Castle Project
- 2007: Touch Up (producer, engineer, mixer) – Mother Mother
- 2007: Schmancey (producer, engineer, mixer) – Fancey
- 2007: Somewhere There's an Angel (producer, engineer, mixer) – The Thurston Revival
- 2007: Key Principles (producer, engineer, mixer) – Nathan
- 2007: Challengers (engineer) – The New Pornographers
- 2008: Slimming Mirrors, Flattering Lights (producer, engineer, mixer) – The Awkward Stage
- 2008: O My Heart (producer, engineer, mixer) – Mother Mother
- 2009: Rearrange Beds (mixer) – An Horse
- 2009: Territory (mixer) – Two Hours Traffic
- 2009: XXXX (producer, engineer, mixer) – You Say Party! We Say Die!
- 2009: Islands Disappear (producer, engineer, mixer) – Said the Whale
- 2009: Sainthood (co-producer, engineer) – Tegan and Sara
- 2010: This Is Good (producer, engineer, mixer; vocals) – Hannah Georgas
- 2010: Tic Toc Tic (producer, engineer, mixer) – The Zolas
- 2010: Spring Romance (producer, engineer, mixer) – Bend Sinister
- 2010: Kidcutter (producer, engineer) – Fast Romantics
- 2010: Cho Dependent (producer, engineer, mixer) – Margaret Cho
- 2010: Flood (mixer) – Jeremy Fisher
- 2011: I See Trouble (producer, engineer, mixer) – Rich Hope and his Evil Doers
- 2011: Eureka (digital release) (mixer) – Mother Mother
- 2011: Get Along (engineer, mixer) – Tegan and Sara
- 2011: Walls (producer, engineer, mixer) – An Horse
- 2011: Long Time Ago (mixer) – Current Swell
- 2012: No Good Deed Goes Unpunished (mixer) – The Mocking Bird
- 2012: Threads (producer, engineer, mixer) – Now, Now
- 2012: Fine Times (producer, engineer, mixer) – Fine Times
- 2012: Drive Me Home (producer, engineer) – The Reason
- 2012: My Friends (producer, engineer, mixer) – Paper Lions
- 2013: Fall of Romance (producer, engineer, mixer) – Imaginary Cities
- 2013: Afterlife Blues (producer, engineer, mixer) – Fast Romantics
- 2013: I Heard I Had (producer, engineer) – Dear Rouge
- 2014: Engines (producer, engineer, mixer) – City Walls
- 2014: No Bad Days (producer, engineer, mixer) – Bestie
- 2014: Brill Bruisers (producer, engineer) – The New Pornographers
- 2014: Monarca (producer, engineer, mixer) – La Gusana Ciega
- 2014: All Is Bright - Baby Please Come Home (producer, engineer, mixer) – No Sinner
- 2015: Pacific Gold (producer, engineer, mixer) – Timothy Jaromir
- 2016: Inclusive Fitness (producer, engineer, mixer) – Strength of Materials
- 2024: Mentors (producer) – Fish in a Birdcage
