= London Ontario Live Arts Festival =

Arts festival in Ontario, Canada

The London Ontario Live Arts Festival also known as LOLA Fest, was an arts festival which took place in downtown London, Ontario, Canada, in the third week of September, from 2006 to 2010. It began as a one-day street festival in 2006 and expanded to the three-day format in 2007. The festival was founded by Andrew Francis; LOLA 2007, LOLA 2008, LOLA 2009, and LOLA 2010 were curated by Ian Doig-Phaneuf (music) and Paul Walde (visual art and Artistic Director).

LOLA was an imaginative live arts festival with contributions from well-known and emerging artists; it included large-scale projections on building exteriors, outdoor advertising space, neon signage, street theatre and generative art projects by international artists, plus interactive drama, musical and dance performances, and the involvement of major organizations from around the country.

== Featured Artists ==
LOLA Fest 2006: September 23

- Elliott Brood
- Born Ruffians
- Tokyo Police Club

LOLA Fest 2007: September 20, 21, 22

- The Acorn
- Akron/Family
- The Barmitzvah Brothers
- Basia Bulat
- Beach House
- blackhole factory
- The Boy From E.T.
- Brian Eno
- Carolyn Mark
- Constantines
- DD/MM/YYYY
- Feuermusik
- Figure & Ground
- Final Fantasy
- Geoff Berner
- Great Aunt Ida
- Grizzly Bear
- Holy Fuck
- Hylozoists
- Jenny Omnichord
- Jose Seone
- Kevin Curtis Norcross
- The Knaves
- Laura Barrett
- Laura Kavanaugh and Ian Birse
- Mantler
- The Meligrove Band
- Michael Chapin
- Mr Ghosty
- Ohbijou
- OK Cobra
- Old Man Luedecke
- The Postage Stamps
- Prefuse 73
- Raised by Swans
- Sandro Perri
- Shad
- Sigi Torinus
- Snailhouse
- Stop Die Resuscitate
- Thesis Sahib
- Toolshed
- Torngat
- Tusks
- Two Minute Miracles
- Video Hippos
- What Seas What Shores
- Wooden Stars

LOLA Fest 2008: September 18, 19, 20, 21

- Beth Learn
- Bocce
- Brendan Fernandes
- Christian Bök
- Darren Wershler-Henry
- David Dyment
- David Merritt
- David Poolman
- Do Make Say Think
- The Drift
- Feuermusik
- Francesca Vivenza
- Holy Fuck
- Hylozoists
- Jokers Of The Scene
- Kelly Mark
- Laura Barrett
- Laurel Woodcock
- Lowfish
- Megasoid
- Michael Chapin
- Michelle Gay
- Muskox
- Nobou Kubota
- Off The International Radar
- Olenka and the Autumn Lovers
- Paul Dutton
- Plants and Animals
- Rich Jacobs
- Roman Tkaczyk
- Sandro Perri and Friends
- Steve McCaffery
- Sylvia Ptak
- Taylor McKimens
- Thunderheist
- Tin
- W. Mark Sutherland
- We Are Wolves
- Woodhands

LOLA Fest 2009: September 17, 18, 19, 20

- Aganetha Dyck
- A Horse and His Boy
- Akron/Family
- Bruce Peninsula
- Canailles
- Colorlist
- Dave Dyment
- DJ Freek
- DJ Makeshift
- DJ Sope
- Final Fantasy
- Gordon Monahan
- Invincible
- Jesse Stewart
- Jonathan Coe
- Kaki King
- Kelly Mark
- Kevin Curtis-Norcross
- Michael Snow
- Miz Korona
- Nicholas Longstaff
- Nihilist Spasm Band
- Pat the Bunny
- Polar Bear
- Richard Dyck
- The Riderless
- Rod Skimmins
- Slaraffenland
- Stop Die Resuscitate
- Testament
- Thesis Sahib
- Thinkbox
- Robert Youds

LOLA Fest 2010: September 16, 17, 18, 19

- Arthur's Landing
- Ben Gunning
- Born Ruffians
- Capillary Action
- Caribou
- Chicago Underground
- Christopher Willits
- Exit 2012
- Fond of Tigers
- Invincible
- Land of Talk
- Leaf Bird
- Lee Ranaldo
- The Light of East Ensemble
- Minotaurs
- My Brightest Diamond
- Rhys Chatham
- Thesis Sahib
- Tony Conrad
- Transmorphous Sound Ensemble
- Trio Tarana
- White Rainbow
- Wild Domestic
