= Dyment (surname) =

Dyment is a surname, and may refer to:

- Albert Dyment (1869–1944), Canadian businessman and politicia
- Chris Dyment (born 1979), American ice hockey player
- Clifford Dyment (1914–1971), Welsh poet
- Dave Dyment, Canadian artist
- David Dyment, Canadian author and academic
