= Bend Sinister =

A bend sinister is a heraldic charge.

Bend Sinister may also refer to:

- Bend Sinister (novel), a 1947 novel by Vladimir Nabokov
- Bend Sinister (album), a 1986 album by the post-punk group The Fall
- Bend Sinister (band), a progressive rock band from British Columbia, Canada
- Bend Sinister (EP), a 2007 extended play album by the band of the same name
