= Northern soul (disambiguation) =

Northern soul is a music and dance movement that emerged from the British mod scene, initially in northern England in the late 1960s.

Northern Soul may also refer to:

- Northern Soul (54-40 album) or the title song, 2008
- Northern Soul (M People album), 1991
- "Northern Soul", a song by Above & Beyond from Common Ground, 2018
- Northern Soul (film), a 2014 British film

== See also ==
- A Northern Soul, an album by the Verve, 1995
- A Northern Soul (Sheridan Smith album), 2018
- Southern soul
