= Bocce (band) =

Canadian electronic rock band

- Origin: Waterloo, Ontario, Canada
- Genres: Electronic rock
- Years active: 2005–2016
- Label: Dadmobile Records
- Members: Mike Bond; Ben Ong; Tony Salomone; Nik Must
- Website: www.kwbocceclub.com

Bocce was an electronic rock band from Waterloo, Ontario, Canada.

== Biography ==
Mike Bond and Ben Ong formed the band in 2005, and added Tony Salomone and Nik Must. Bocce toured throughout Canada and played several music festivals including Pop Montreal, Hillside Inside, LOLA and Canadian Music Week.

Their first EP, Hi Birdbear / Can't Reason Do It?, was released in 2006 to positive reviews and reached #9 on Earshot!'s Canadian campus and community radio charts.

Bocce released a limited edition EP, …Should Be an Olympic Sport, in 2008 and remixed several Canadian artists including You Say Party! We Say Die!'s "Poison" and Slow Hand Motem's "Mathemagical" in the year following. In Spring 2010, Bocce released their first full-length album, Disambiguation, both as a physical disc and as a Pay what you can digital download. In 2012, they released the album Future 1.0.

Bocce's social media accounts have been inactive since 2016.

== Members ==
- Mike Bond (Drums)
- Ben Ong (Synthesizer, Omnichord)
- Tony Salomone (Vocals, Synthesizer)
- Nik Must (Synthesizer, Piano)

== Discography ==
=== Albums ===
- Disambiguation (album) (2010)
- Future 1.0 (2012)

=== EPs ===
- Hi Birdbear / Can't Reason Do It? (2006), Independent
- …Should Be an Olympic Sport (2008)

=== Contributions ===
- Friends in Bellwoods II (2009): "Inspiration"
- You Say Party! We Say Die! - Remik's Cube (2009): "Poison"
- Slow Hand Motem - Mathemagical (2009): "Mathemagical"
