= Hit the Floor =

Hit the Floor may refer to:

== Music ==
- Hit the Floor!, a 2005 album by You Say Party
- "Hit the Floor", a song by Big Ali featuring Dollarman from Big Ali's album Louder
- "Hit the Floor", a song by Bullet for my Valentine from the album The Poison
- "Hit the Floor", a song by Denzel Curry from the mixtape King of the Mischievous South Vol. 2
- "Hit the Floor", the fifth song from Linkin Park's second studio album Meteora
- "Hit the Floor" (Twista song), off of Twista's album, The Day After

== Other ==
- Hit the Floor (TV series), a VH1 television series debuted in 2013
