= Spring Romance =

Spring Romance may refer to:

- Spring Romance, album by Dan Gibson 1998
- Spring Romance (EP) from the band Bend Sinister
- "Spring Romance", song by the Finnish hard rock band Stala & so from It Is So
