= Stories of Brothers, Tales of Lovers =

Studio album by Bend Sinister
- Released: October 21, 2008
- Recorded: 2007–2008
- Genre: Indie rock, prog rock
- Length: 55:47
- Label: Distort Entertainment
- Producer: Shawn Cole

Bend Sinister chronology
Bend Sinister (2007)	Stories of Brothers, Tales of Lovers (2008)	Spring Romance (2010)

Stories of Brothers, Tales of Lovers is Bend Sinister's second album which was released October 21, 2008. This album could be classified as a follow-up concept album to their self-titled EP. The first single, "The Same Things" was released on September 16, 2008. The album was produced, and mixed by Vancouver's Shawn F. Cole, co-owner of FaderMaster studios.

The album takes you on a roller coaster ride through the stories of brothers and lovers; hence the album name. The album is split into two halves: first half consisting of Stories of Brothers and the second half focusing on Tales of Lovers.

== Track listing ==
1. The News – 5:12
2. Brothers of Humankind – 3:48
3. The Same Things – 3:55
4. Jimmy Brown – 3:49
5. CT – 3:17
6. Careless – 4:20
7. Because Because – 4:14
8. Give Into The Night – 4:31
9. Dr. Lee – 3:59
10. Julianna – 3:25
11. Once Again – 3:46
12. Give Into The Night (reprise) – 1:43
13. Demise – 7:58
14. City Lights – 1:50

== Personnel ==
- Dan Moxon – lead vocals/organ
- Naben Ruthnum – lead guitar
- Jon Bunyan – guitar/keyboards/vocals
- Jason Dana – drums
- Joel Myers – bass
