= Goodbye Flatland =

Studio album by 54-40
- Released: June 17, 2003
- Genre: Alternative rock
- Label: Divine Industries
- Producer: Howard Redekopp

54-40 chronology
Radio Love Songs: The Singles Collection (2002)	Goodbye Flatland (2003)	Yes to Everything (2005)

Goodbye Flatland is the tenth album by Canadian rock band 54-40. The album did not do well commercially compared to their previous albums, only debuting at #36 on the Canadian Alternative Albums chart.

== Track listing ==
1. "Ride" – 3:53
2. "Animal in Pain" – 2:50
3. "Take Me Out" – 4:01
4. "Hope the Hell I Haven't Died" – 3:11
5. "Not Enough to Make You Happy" – 3:33
6. "Who is Sylvia" – 4:18
7. "Broken Girl" – 4:16
8. "Goodbye Flatland" – 3:26
9. "Secret" – 4:31
10. "Giants" – 3:40
11. "Seventeen On" – 4:23
12. "Wish I Knew" – 2:48

== Production ==
- Howard Redekopp - Producer, Engineer
- Warne Livesey - Mixer
