= Through the Broken City =

Studio album by Bend Sinister
- Released: November 8, 2005
- Recorded: 2004–2005
- Genres: Indie rock, prog-rock
- Length: 46:17
- Label: Storyboard

Bend Sinister chronology
The Warped Pane (2002)	Through the Broken City (2005)	Bend Sinister (2007)

Through the Broken City is the debut album by Vancouver band Bend Sinister, released on November 8, 2005. Following their instrumental EP, The Warped Pane, Dan Moxon switched to lead vocals and keyboard, Jon Bunyan joined on guitar, keyboard, and vocals, and Kevin Keegan replaced Dan Goughnour on drums.

== Track listing ==
1. Through the Broken City - 4:36
2. When Your Skin Makes You Crawl - 5:54
3. Hell or Shelter - 3:53
4. Fool to Love - 5:17
5. Preach for the Stars - 5:29
6. Tough Love - 4:24
7. Truth or Truth - 5:20
8. Selling Promises - 4:44
9. Under the Ground - 6:40

== Personnel ==
- Dan Moxon – lead vocals, organ
- Jon Bunyan – guitar, keyboards, vocals
- Naben Ruthnum – lead guitar
- Dave Buck – bass
- Kevin Keegan – drums
