= Hit the Floor! =

Studio album by You Say Party
- Released: September 2005
- Genre: Indie rock, dance-punk
- Length: 44:53
- Label: Sound Document
- Producer: Shawn Cole

You Say Party chronology
Danskwad (2004)	Hit the Floor! (2005)	Lose All Time (2007)

Professional ratings
Review scores
Source	Rating
Allmusic	3/5 stars
Pitchfork Media	(7.3/10)

Hit the Floor! is the debut album from You Say Party (formerly You Say Party! We Say Die!), a dance-punk band hailing from Abbotsford, British Columbia. It was released in September, 2005 by the indie label Sound Document, and on vinyl by Reluctant Recordings in March, 2006.

Although it was listed in numerous places as You Say Party's first release, the band had in fact independently released an EP in 2004, entitled danskwad.

On the CD, the track "Repocamix Meow!" can be found at the end of "Don't Wait Up" while the track can be heard on the record by playing the inside-out groove at the end of Side B.

== Track listing ==
1. "(Overture)" – 2:02
2. "Cold Hands! Hot Bodies!" – 2:56
3. "Stockholm Syndrome, Part One" – 2:50
4. "Stockholm Syndrome, Part Two" – 1:55
5. "You Did It!" – 2:25
6. "The Gap (Between the Rich and the Poor)" – 3:02
7. "Midnight Snack" – 4:03
8. "Love in the New Millennium (Your Pants My Couch)" – 3:16
9. "Jazz Crabs" – 2:15
10. "Rise" – 2:45
11. "He!She!You!Me!They!We!Us!OK" – 2:30
12. "Don't Wait Up" – 14:54
