= Walls (An Horse album) =

Studio album by An Horse
- Released: 26 April 2011
- Recorded: 2010
- Studios: The Armoury Studios, Vancouver, British Columbia, Canada
- Genres: Indie pop Indie rock
- Length: 40:16
- Label: Mom + Pop Music
- Producer: Howard Redekopp

An Horse studio albums chronology
Rearrange Beds (2009)	Walls (2011)	Modern Air (2019)

Professional ratings
Review scores
Source	Rating
AllMusic	3/5 stars
Rolling Stone	3.5/5 stars
Spin (magazine)	8/10 stars

Walls is the second studio album by the Australian pop and rock duo An Horse. The album was recorded at The Armoury Studios in Vancouver, British Columbia, Canada in 2010 and was released on 26 April 2011 by Mom + Pop Music. The thirteen songs in the album are "Dressed Sharply", "Not Mine", "Airport Death", "Know This, We've Noticed", "Trains and Tracks", "Brain on a Table", "100 Whales", "Walls" (the same name of the album), "Leave Me", "Windows in the City", "Swallow the Sea", "Tiny Skeletons" and "New Ways".

== Track listing ==
No.	Title	Length
1.	"Dressed Sharply"	3:31
2.	"Not Mine"	3:01
3.	"Airport Death"	2:20
4.	"Know This, We've Noticed"	3:47
5.	"Trains and Tracks"	2:54
6.	"Walls"	3:37
7.	"Brain on a Table"	3:41
8.	"100 Whales"	3:34
9.	"Leave Me"	2:37
10.	"Windows in the City"	2:56
11.	"Swallow the Sea"	3:22
12.	"Tiny Skeletons"	3:11
13.	"New Ways"	1:48
Total length:		40:16

== Personnel ==
=== An Horse ===
- Kathleen "Kate" Cooper - lead vocals and electric guitar
- Damon Cox - drum kit, backing vocals and electronic keyboards

=== Production ===
- Howard Redekopp - record producer and recording and mixing engineer
- Jarett Holmes - assistant engineer

=== Additional personnel ===
- Sara Quin - backing vocals on "Swallow the Sea"
