= La Gusana Ciega =

Mexican rock band

- Origin: Mexico City
- Genres: Rock en español; pop rock; alternative rock
- Years active: 1993–2002, 2005–present
- Labels: Universal Records; Discos Manicomio; Intolerancia
- Members: Daniel Gutiérrez; Germán Arroyo; Luis Ernesto Martínez
- Past members: Manuel Leyva; Edwin Sours; Jorge Vilchis
- Website: Official site

La Gusana Ciega (Spanish for "The Blind She-Worm") is a Mexican alternative rock and pop-rock band composed of Daniel Gutiérrez (voice and guitar), Germán Arroyo (drums), and Luis Ernesto Martínez "Lu" (bass).

== History ==
The band's origin dates back to the late 1980s when the original trio formed by Daniel Gutiérrez on vocals and guitar, Manuel Leyva on bass and Edwin Sours on drums (the latter being replaced by Germán Arroyo after a couple of years) began to establish themselves in Mexico City's underground rock scene. After several years of small gigs in bars and clubs, they recorded their first studio album in 1996, Merlina, which was well received. The band added guitarist Jorge Vilchis (ex-member of Guillotina) the following year, which contributed to the evolution of a more characteristic sound, reflected in their second studio album, Superbee. La Gusana Ciega opened for Oasis in 1998 as one of Mexico's main indie rock groups. They traveled to the US in 1999 to record their third album, Correspondencia Interna.

Having gained considerable popularity, the band toured Mexico and select US cities in 2000, culminating in the release of their live album, lagusanaciega. The following year, they continued their American foray with an English EP entitled Edición Limitada. One of these songs, "Sunday Fever", was included in the Latin American edition of the American Pie soundtrack.

La Gusana Ciega broke up suddenly in May 2002, despite their growing popularity.

The members pursued other musical projects during the following three years, with the exception of Leyva, the bassist, who moved to the US. Gutiérrez played with Cosmonova, while Arroyo and Vilchis joined Pardo VanDaik. In early 2005, they announced a reunion tour with the notable substitution of Martínez, Cosmonova's bass player, for Leyva.

This was followed by the release of a best-of anthology, together with a DVD of their videos, entitled Super Especial. They headed back to the studio in 2006 and released La Rueda del Diablo, their fourth full-length album. In 2008 they released Jaibol, an album consisting of covers and one new song. Conejo en el Sombrero was released in 2011 as a digital download, CD, and vinyl album.

Their latest album, Monarca, was released in 2014, earning a nomination for Best Rock Album at the 2015 Latin Grammy Awards. Monarca was produced, engineered, and mixed by Howard Redekopp, who has also produced Tegan and Sara, The New Pornographers, and Mother Mother.

== Discography ==
Their discography includes seven studio albums, one live album, one EP, and a best-of anthology.

- Merlina (1996)
- Superbee (1997)
- Correspondencia Interna (1999)
- lagusanaciega (2000), live
- Edición Limitada (2001), EP
- Super Especial (2005), best-of
- La Rueda del Diablo (2006)
- Jaibol (2008)
- Conejo en el Sombrero (2011)
- Monarca (2014)
- Borregos en la Niebla I (2017)
