= Naben Ruthnum =

Canadian writer

Naben Ruthnum is a Canadian writer, who has published work under both his own name and the pen name Nathan Ripley.

He won the Journey Prize in 2013 for his short story "Cinema Rex", and has since published the books Curry: Reading, Eating and Race (2017), a non-fiction essay collection about immigrant cultural identity in food and literature, and two literary thriller novels, Find You in the Dark and Your Life is Mine. Ruthnum's current novel, A Hero of Our Time, was published in January 2022 and a novella, Helpmeet, was published in May 2022.

Originally from Kelowna, British Columbia, Ruthnum is of Mauritian descent. He has a master's degree from McGill University, where he wrote his thesis on the role of Oscar Wilde in the development of the ghost story in British literature.

Ruthnum is also a former musician who was a guitarist for Bend Sinister, a Vancouver-based progressive rock band.
