= Fight for Love (54-40 album) =

Studio album by 54-40
- Released: 1989
- Studio: Mushroom, Vancouver
- Genre: Rock
- Length: 43:49
- Label: Reprise
- Producer: Dave Ogilvie, Neil Osborne

54-40 chronology
| Show Me (1987) | Fight for Love (1989) | Sweeter Things: A Compilation (1991) |

Singles from Fight for Love
- 1. "Miss You" Released: 1989; 2. "Baby, Have Some Faith" Released: 1989; 3. "Over My Head" Released: 1990

Fight for Love is the fourth album by the Canadian band 54-40, released in 1989. The band supported the album with a Canadian tour.

== Production ==
The album was coproduced by Dave Ogilvie and frontman Neil Osborne. The band used a mellotron that had belonged to King Crimson, loaned to them by Bob Rock. Some of the songs were inspired by Osborne's wife's drawings of Don Quixote.

== Critical reception ==
Professional ratings
Review scores
| Source | Rating |
|---|---|
| AllMusic | 3/5 stars |
| Windsor Star | A− |

The Calgary Herald deemed the album "a blend of guitar-driven rock numbers and lofty lyrics." The Globe and Mail wrote that "Osborne and co-producer David Ogilvie focus attention on the hopeful, even naive humanism of the songs and on the subtle but powerful interplay." The Windsor Star noted the "guitar-driven sound derived from late-1960s folk-rock." The Washington Post labeled the album "Vancouver's entry in the R.E.M. sweepstakes," writing: "Sweetly melodic and—it almost goes without saying—jangly, Fight for Love also has some guts."

== Track listing ==
- All songs written by 54-40 except where noted.
1. "Here in My House" – 3:49
2. "Kissfolk" – 3:33
3. "Over My Head" – 3:25
4. "Miss You" – 4:34 (Neil Osborne, Phil Comparelli)
5. "Baby Have Some Faith" – 5:51 (Osborne, Comparelli)
6. "Fight for Love" – 2:55 (Osborne)
7. "Laughing" – 3:51 (Osborne)
8. "Walk Talk Madly" – 4:42
9. "Where Is My Heart" – 3:25
10. "Journey" – 7:44 (Osborne)

== Personnel ==
- Neil Osborne: Vocals, Rhythm Guitar
- Phil Comparelli: Lead and Lap Steel Guitars, Trumpet, Vocals
- Brad Merritt: Bass
- Matt Johnson: Drums, Percussion

Production

- Arranged by 54–40
- Executive Producer: Kevin Laffey
- Produced by Dave Ogilvie and Neil Osborne
- Recorded by Greg Reely
- Mixed by James "Jimbo" Barton (tracks 1–3 and 5) and Greg Reely (all others)
- Mastered by Stephen Marcussen
- All songs published by Fifty Four Forty Music.
