= Remik's Cube =

Remix album by You Say Party
- Released: August 26, 2008
- Genre: Indie rock, dance-punk
- Label: Paper Bag Digital

You Say Party chronology
Lose All Time (2007)	Remik's Cube (2008)	XXXX (2009)

Remik's Cube is the third album by You Say Party (formerly You Say Party! We Say Die!), released digital-only on Paper Bag Digital on August 26, 2008. Remik's Cube is a reworking of their previous album Lose All Time.

== Track listing ==
1. Five Year Plan (Vitaminsforyou 6th Year Remix) - 6:50
2. Downtown Mayors Goodnight, Alley Kids Rule! (S-2 Beatdown Mayors Mix) - 3:30
3. Opportunity (Montag's I Love Her Remix) - 3:41
4. Teenage Hit Wonder (Re-styled by Camp America) - 2:58
5. Monster (RAC Remix) - 3:59
6. Like I Give A Care (The Octupus Project Remix) - 4:15
7. Poison (Bocce Remix) - 2:37
8. Moon (Wallpaper Remix) - 3:54
9. Giants Hands (Kevvy Mental's Hand in Hand in Hand's Remix) - 3:07
10. You're Almost There (DJ Rexford Remix) - 4:16
11. Dancefloor Destroyer (Great Lenin's Ghost Remix) - 2:51
12. Quiet World (Stop.Die.Resuscitate Remix) - 3:00
