= Anything (Kinnie Starr album) =

Studio album by Kinnie Starr
- Released: 2006
- Label: MapleMusic Recordings
- Producer: Howard Redekopp

Anything is an album by Kinnie Starr, released in 2006 on MapleMusic Recordings.

The album's title track was the first-ever #1 single on CBC Radio 3's new countdown show The R3-30.

== Track listing ==
1. "Step Back"
2. "Anything"
3. "La Le La La" (feat. Tegan Quin)
4. "Rock the Boat"
5. "Up in Smoke"
6. "Please Hold My Hand"
7. "Sex in the Prairies"
8. "Blackbrown Eyes"
9. "Wind in Your Sail"
10. "Walking Away"
11. "Not Enough"

== Personnel ==
=== Additional personnel ===
Tegan Quin – vocals on "La Le Lala".

=== Production ===
- Howard Redekopp – producer, engineer, mixer
