= Lose All Time =

Studio album by You Say Party
- Released: 20 March 2007
- Genre: Indie rock, dance-punk
- Label: Paper Bag Records
- Producer: Shawn Cole

You Say Party chronology
Hit the Floor! (2005)	Lose All Time (2007)	Remik's Cube (2008)

Professional ratings
Review scores
Source	Rating
AllMusic	4/5 stars
Pitchfork	6.8/10
This Is Fake DIY	3.5/5 stars

Lose All Time is the second album from Vancouver's You Say Party (formerly You Say Party! We Say Die!) and the first for their new label Paper Bag Records who released it on March 20, 2007.

"Downtown Mayors Goodnight, Alley Kids Rule!" reached #1 on CBC Radio 3's R3-30 chart the week of June 7, 2007.

The vinyl release of Lose All Time was released by Paper Bag Records in July 2007. There were only 300 copies in Europe and 300 copies in North America ever produced.

== UK Track listing ==
1. Five Year Plan (3:19)
2. Downtown Mayors Goodnight, Alley Kids Rule! (2:29)
3. Opportunity (3:44)
4. Teenage Hit Wonder (2:38)
5. Monster (3:38)
6. Like I Give A Care (3:17)
7. Poison (2:40)
8. Moon (2:55)
9. Giant Hands (3:25)
10. You're Almost There (4:01)
11. Dancefloor Destroyer (3:14)
12. Midnight Snake (UK Bonus Recording) (3:29)
13. Quiet World (22:52)
14. Quit it (23:34)

== North American Track listing ==
1. Five Year Plan (3:19)
2. Downtown Mayors Goodnight, Alley Kids Rule! (2:29)
3. Opportunity (3:44)
4. Teenage Hit Wonder (2:38)
5. Monster (3:38)
6. Like I Give A Care (3:17)
7. Poison (2:40)
8. Moon (2:55)
9. Giant Hands (3:25)
10. Dancefloor Destroyer (3:14)
11. You're Almost There (4:01)
12. Quiet World (22:52)

(There is an error in the track listing of the North American version. Dancefloor Destroyer and You're Almost There are named in the track listing incorrectly.)

== Japan Track listing ==
1. Quiet World (3:30)
2. Five Year Plan (3:19)
3. Downtown Mayors Goodnight, Alley Kids Rule! (2:29)
4. Monster (3:38)
5. Teenage Hit Wonder (2:38)
6. Poison (2:40)
7. Giant Hands (3:25)
8. Machine Legs (Japan Bonus Track) (1:35)
9. Moon (2:55)
10. Dancefloor Destroyer (3:14)
11. You're Almost There (4:01)
12. Opportunity (3:44)
13. Like I Give A Care (3:17)
14. Midnight Snake (3:30)
1. Monster (Bonus Enhanced Music Video)
