= Set the Fire =

Studio album by 54-40
- Released: January 1984
- Genre: Alternative rock
- Label: Warner- (previously WEA Canada)
- Producer: Allen Moy

54-40 chronology
Selection (1982)	Set the Fire (1984)	54•40 (1986)

Professional ratings
Review scores
Source	Rating
AllMusic	2/5 stars

Set the Fire is the debut full-length album by Canadian alternative rock band 54-40, released in 1984 on Mo-Da-Mu.

Although no longer in print, Set the Fire and its predecessor Selection were re-released in 1997 on the album Sound of Truth: The Independent Collection.

== Track listing ==
1. "Set the Fire"
2. "A Big Idea"
3. "Around the Bend"
4. "Cha Cha"
5. "One Place Set"
6. "What to Do Now"
7. "Lost My Hand"
8. "Sound of Truth"
9. "Broken Pieces"
