= Rearrange Beds =

Studio album by An Horse
- Released: 17 March 2009; 25 January 2019 (vinyl)
- Genre: Indie pop Indie rock
- Length: 36:02
- Label: Mom + Pop Music; Poison City Records; Valve Records; Lame-O Records (vinyl)
- Producer: Magoo

An Horse studio albums chronology
Rearrange Beds (2009)	Walls (2011)

Professional ratings
Aggregate scores
Source	Rating
Metacritic	73%
Review scores
Source	Rating
Allmusic	4/5 stars
Consequence of Sound	F
Now	2/5 stars
Pitchfork Media	6.7/10
MSN Music (Consumer Guide)	A−
Rolling Stone	3.5/5 stars

Rearrange Beds is the first studio album by the Australian pop and rock duo An Horse. The album was released on 17 March 2009 by Mom + Pop Music, Poison City Records and Valve Records. On 25 January 2019, Lame-O Records released and re-issued the first vinyl pressing for the album's 10-year anniversary.

== Track listing ==
No.	Title	Length
1.	"Camp Out"	3:39
2.	"Postcards"	2:30
3.	"Company"	3:46
4.	"Horizons"	3:05
5.	"Rearrange Beds"	4:16
6.	"Little Little Little"	2:45
7.	"Little Lungs"	5:23
8.	"Scared As Fuck"	3:13
9.	"Shoes Watch"	4:34
10.	"Listen"	2:51
Total length:		36:02

== Personnel ==
=== An Horse ===
- Kathleen "Kate" Cooper - lead vocals, electric guitar and acoustic guitar
- Damon Cox - drum kit, backing vocals and melodica

=== Production ===
- Magoo - record producer
- Howard Redekopp - mixing engineer
