= An Horse =

Australian rock band

- Origin: Brisbane, Australia
- Genres: Indie pop Indie rock Shoegazing; Power pop Alternative rock
- Years active: 2007–present
- Labels: Mom + Pop Music; Grand Hotel van Cleef; Lame-O Records; Poison City Records; Valve Records
- Members: Kathleen "Kate" Cooper; Damon Cox
- Website: anhorse.com

An Horse is an Australian pop and rock duo, formed in 2007 in Brisbane, Australia and founded by Kathleen "Kate" Cooper and Damon Cox. The duo has released three studio albums (Rearrange Beds in 2009, Walls in 2011 and Modern Air in 2019) and two 2009 hit singles ("Camp Out" and "Postcards").

== History ==
=== Becoming An Horse ===
Kathleen "Kate" Cooper and Damon Cox met while working at an independent record store called Skinny's in Brisbane, Australia. They began making music together in 2007, and set up a PA in the store, where they would rehearse after-hours and organise shows in the Brisbane area.

=== 2007–2008: Not Really Scared ===
The duo's first recording was a 5-song EP, Not Really Scared, which was released by local Brisbane label Valve Records. Kathleen handed a rough mix version on CD to Tegan and Sara at the Canadian duo's in-store performance at Skinny's, and not long after received an invite for An Horse to open their Out of Hibernation US tour in April 2008. Off the back of that tour, they were the first duo to be signed to New York label Mom + Pop Music by Michael Goldstone. They returned to the US in October 2008 for tours with Bishop Allen and Jessica Lea Mayfield, while continuing to tour at home in Australia with Death Cab For Cutie, The New Pornographers and more.

=== 2009–2010: Rearrange Beds ===
Their debut album, Rearrange Beds, was released on 17 March 2009 on the label Mom + Pop. It was recorded in Australia with ARIA award-winning Australian producer Magoo, and was mixed in Vancouver by Howard Redekopp. The album received favourable reviews from Pitchfork, Spin and Rolling Stone. Upon its release they appeared on The Late Show with David Letterman and continued with extensive US touring with acts including The Appleseed Cast, Silversun Pickups, Cage the Elephant, Wintersleep and Telekinesis. They also opened again for Tegan and Sara on Australian, UK and Canadian tours. 2010 touring included shows with Kaki King, Dashboard Confessional and The Big Pink. A 2010 Australian tour with Against Me! was scheduled, but was later cancelled. Cooper and Cox worked on writing their second album throughout 2010, and recording took place that summer in Vancouver with Howard Redekopp producing. 2010 also saw the band tour Germany, Austria and Switzerland extensively as Rearrange Beds saw a release on the Grand Hotel van Cleef label. Festival appearances included Gurten Festival in Bern, Switzerland and MELT! in Germany. A remix EP called Beds Rearranged was released on 23 March 2010. The EP includes remixes of songs from Rearrange Beds by artists such as RAC and Gerard Smith from TV on the Radio.

=== 2011–2012: Walls ===
An Horse released their second album Walls on 26 April 2011, again through Mom + Pop. It debuted at number 17 on the Billboard Heatseekers Albums Chart The opening-song, "Dressed Sharply", was selected as iTunes Single of the Week, and was also praised by NPR. Alternative Press magazine, Pitchfork and Spin also posted positive reviews. Touring for Walls included festival slots at Lollapalooza, Bamboozle, ACL Festival, Osheaga, Southside, Hurricane, Rolling Stone Weekender, Falls Festival, Southbound, SXSW, Sled Island and more. In addition to headline shows in 2011/2012 An Horse toured in the US with Manchester Orchestra, Kevin Devine, Nada Surf, Alkaline Trio and in Canada with Brand New and Cursive. Two headline tours of Australia also took place.

=== 2013–2017: Hiatus and other projects ===
The duo did not play live for several years after coming off tour in support of Walls. The duo reconvened for one show on 29 December 2015 at Crowbar in Brisbane. There were hints of working on new music during 2017. During the duo's hiatus, Cooper released an eponymous solo album via Mom + Pop in June 2015. Meanwhile, Cox toured as a drummer for Kevin Devine and occasionally Tancred, as well as an auxiliary percussionist and drum tech for Brand New up to their 2017 tour.

=== 2018: Return and "Get Out Somehow" ===
On 1 March 2018 the duo announced they were going to start playing again, beginning with three shows in Canada with Camp Cope. Later, on 5 March, they announced they would be touring the US with The Front Bottoms. On 16 May, the duo released the single "Get Out Somehow", which marked their first new music since 2011.

=== 2019: Rearrange Beds re-issue and Modern Air ===
On 23 January 2019, the duo announced a new album was to be released in May on Lame-O Records, with a vinyl repressing of Rearrange Beds preceding it in late January. On 18 March, they revealed the album was called Modern Air with a release date of 3 May. Mike Sapone produced and mixed the album. The album's release was preceded by two further singles: "This is a Song" on 20 March, and "Ship of Fools" on 12 April. In May 2019 the duo toured North America with longtime friends Camp Cope.

Damon Cox became the drummer of Modest Mouse in 2023 following the death of founding drummer Jeremiah Green on December 31, 2022.

== Appearances ==
=== Film and television ===
On March 12, 2009, An Horse made their first ever television appearance on the Late Show with David Letterman, performing their song "Camp Out". "Postcards" appeared in a television advertisement for the Mercedes-Benz CLC-Class in 2008. "Trains and Tracks" was featured in the 2017 British romantic comedy-drama film Happy Birthday, Toby Simpson.

== Discography ==
=== Studio albums ===
- Rearrange Beds (released in 2009 by Valve Records, Mom + Pop Music and Poison City Records and re-issued in 2019)
- Walls (released in 2011 by Mom + Pop Music)
- Modern Air (released in 2019 by Lame-O Records and Poison City Records)

=== Extended plays ===
- Not Really Scared (released in 2008 by Valve Records)
- Beds Rearranged Remix EP (released in 2010 by Mom + Pop Music)

=== Non-album single ===
- "Get Out Somehow" (released in 2018)
