= Sound of Truth: The Independent Collection =

Compilation album by 54-40
- Released: May 20, 1997
- Genre: Alternative rock

54-40 chronology
Trusted by Millions (1996)	Sound of Truth: The Independent Collection (1997)	Since When (1998)

Professional ratings
Review scores
Source	Rating
AllMusic	4/5 stars

Sound of Truth: The Independent Collection is a 1997 album by 54-40. It compiles the band's first two independent releases, 1982's Selection (tracks 10–15) and 1984's Set the Fire (tracks 1–9).

== Track listing ==
1. "Set the Fire" – 4:51
2. "A Big Idea" – 3:39
3. "What to Do Now" – 3:10
4. "Sound of Truth" – 4:24
5. "Around the Bend" – 5:35
6. "One Place Set" – 3:27
7. "Cha Cha" – 5:22
8. "Lost My Hand" – 4:28
9. "Broken Pieces" – 6:41
10. "Yank" – 4:54
11. "He's Got" – 3:14
12. "Vows, Sobs, Tears & Kisses" – 3:39
13. "Selection" – 4:17
14. "Re-in-living" – 3:52
15. "(Jamming with) Lawrence" – 5:12
