= XXXX (album) =

Studio album by You Say Party
- Released: September 29, 2009
- Genres: Indie rock, dance-punk
- Length: 39:58
- Label: Paper Bag
- Producer: Howard Redekopp

You Say Party chronology
Remik's Cube (2015)	XXXX (2009)	You Say Party (2016)

Professional ratings
Review scores
Source	Rating
AllMusic	4/5 stars
Pitchfork	(7.0/10)
Austin Chronicle	4/5 stars
Artrocker	4/5 stars

XXXX is the third full-length album by Canadian dance-punk band You Say Party (formerly You Say Party! We Say Die!), released September 29, 2009. It was the last release featuring the band's original longer name and the last album with drummer Devon Clifford (who died in April 2010). The album was recorded between January and August 2009.

The word "XXXX" also appears in several of the album's song titles. In each song, the four Xs represent the word "love". In an interview with CBC Radio 3, the band's vocalist Becky Ninkovic explained that when finalizing the cover art for the band's first EP Dansk Wad, she had wanted to leave a personal "mark of love" on it, and settled on signing it with four small Xs.

The album is often considered to be the high point of You Say Party's career, as it was a longlisted nominee for the 2010 Polaris Music Prize, and won the 2010 Western Canadian Music Award for Rock Recording of the Year.

On September 21, 2010 a Remix album consisting of three of the tracks from XXXX ("Dark Days", "There is XXXX", and "Laura Palmer’s Prom") was released under the title REMIXXXX.

On August 29, 2020, a 10th anniversary edition was released, remastered by Troy Glessner.

== Track listing ==
All lyrics are written by Becky Ninkovic; all music is composed by Derek Adam, Devon Clifford, Krista Loewen, and Stephen O'Shea.

No.	Title	Length
1.	"There Is XXXX (within my heart)"	4:39
2.	"Glory"	2:14
3.	"Dark Days"	4:46
4.	"Cosmic Wanship Avengers"	3:32
5.	"Lonely's Lunch"	4:44
6.	"Make XXXX"	4:0
7.	"Laura Palmer's Prom"	4:44
8.	"She's Spoken For"	3:49
9.	"XXXX/Loyalty"	3:25
10.	"Heart of Gold"	4:08

== Production ==
=== Band ===
- Becky Ninkovic – vocals, arrangements
- Devon Clifford – drums, backing vocals, arrangements
- Derek Adam – guitar, backing vocals, arrangements
- Krista Loewen – keyboards, vocals, arrangements
- Stephen O'Shea – bass, backing vocals, arrangements

=== Session members ===
- Shawn Penner – percussion (additional)
- Saara Itkonen – backing vocals (additional)
- Tamarack Hockin – backing vocals (additional)
- Melissa Gregerson – backing vocals (additional), writing, arrangements

=== Production ===
- Derek Adam – design, photography
- Brock McFarlane – engineering (assistant)
- Steve Hall – mastering
- Ted Gowans – mixing (assistant)
- Chris Janzen – other (group dynamic calibrator)
- Sharla Sauder – other (vocal coach)
- Devon Clifford – photography
- Todd Duym – photography
- Shawn Penner – producer
- Becky Ninkovic – producer (additional), engineering (additional), artwork
- Howard Redekopp – producer, engineering, mixing, photography
