= One Day in Your Life (54-40 song) =

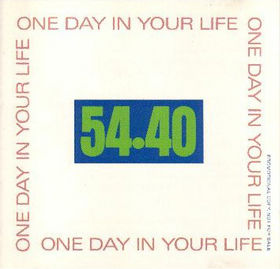

Single by 54-40

from the album Show Me
- Released: 1988
- Genre: Alternative rock
- Length: 4:14
- Label: Reprise
- Songwriters: Phil Comparelli, Brad Merritt, Darryl Neudorf, Neil Osborne
- Producer: 54-40, Dave Ogilvie

54-40 singles chronology
| "I Go Blind" (1986) | "One Day in Your Life" (1988) | "One Gun" (1988) |

"One Day in Your Life" is a song by Canadian rock group 54-40. It was released as a single released from the band's 1987 album, Show Me. It was the band's first song to chart on Canada's singles Chart, peaking at No. 90 on the RPM chart in May, 1988.

== Music and themes ==
The Rocket's Robert Allen described "one Day in Your Life" in 1988 as being "full of hooks: a riveting guitar figure that holds the song together, a surging chorus, and words that stick in your brain whether you want them to our not". Allmusic critic James Chrispell has heard the influence of Midnight Oil in the song.

Neil Osborne explained the song as being about "putting your life in perspective", and that "Rather than getting down, there’s so much that you can convert into up." Florida Today contributor Scott Tilley has cited "One Day in Your Life" as a song of "wisdom and hope" that "[reminds us] that a single day 'shouldn't be a problem'" and "express[ing] beautifully" the idea that as people get older "Every candle symbolizes a year we’ve been granted to love learn, and contribute. The alternative is not being here to commemorate these milestones, which puts them in their proper context as badges of honor rather than burdens to bear [where] no day is as challenging as the day you’re no longer alive—especially for your family and friends".

== Video ==
The video for the song was given a fair amount of airplay on MuchMusic. It debuted on MTV on March 6, 1988.

== Legacy ==
Grande Prairie Daily Herald-Tribune reported in January, 1999 that "One Day in Your Life" had been rated by fans on www.54-40.com as the third best 54-40 song. It was included on The Georgia Straight's 2017 list of the best 50 songs to come out of Vancouver. Fish Griwkowsky of The Edmonton Journal described "One Day in Your Life" in 2022 as a "tough and beautiful" track.

"One Day in Your Life" was released on compilation albums including Heavy Mellow (1999), Radio Love Songs: The Singles Collection (2002) in a re-recorded version, and LA Difference: A History Unplugged (2016) in a version featuring Daniel Lapp on violin.
