= Yes to Everything =

Studio album by 54-40
- Released: June 14, 2005
- Genre: Rock, alternative rock
- Label: True North Records
- Producer: Warne Livesey

54-40 chronology
| Goodbye Flatland (2003) | Yes to Everything (2005) | Northern Soul (2008) |

Professional ratings
Review scores
| Source | Rating |
|---|---|
| AllMusic | 3.5/5 stars |
| Chart Attack | 3.5/5 stars |

Yes to Everything is a 2005 album by Canadian alternative rock band 54-40. This was the first 54-40 album recorded with the band's new guitarist, Dave Genn (former guitarist of Matthew Good Band). The album was recorded at The Warehouse Studio in Vancouver using former Midnight Oil and Matthew Good producer Warne Livesey. "Easy to Love" and "Golden Sun" were released as singles from the album.

== Track listing ==
1. "Easy to Love" – 3:48
2. "Can't Get Enough" – 3:58
3. "Golden Sun" – 4:35
4. "Stopline" – 6:05
5. "This Is Here This Is Now" – 4:21
6. "All About Love" – 3:12
7. "Blue Plate Special" – 3:44
8. "Beautiful Self" – 3:38
9. "Calling You Out" – 3:00
10. "Another Kiss" – 3:06
11. "On the Road Home" – 3:58
