= Northern Soul (54-40 album) =

Studio album by 54-40
- Released: September 30, 2008
- Genre: Alternative rock
- Label: True North Records
- Producer: Warne Livesey, Matt Johnson, Dave Genn and Neil Osborne

54-40 chronology
| Yes to Everything (2005) | Northern Soul (2008) | Lost in the City (2011) |

Professional ratings
Review scores
| Source | Rating |
|---|---|
| Chart Attack | 3.5/5 stars |

Northern Soul is a 2008 album by Canadian alternative rock band 54-40. The album tracks were recorded at The Chapel and 604 in Vancouver, at Otter Point on Denman Island, and Ormond Street Studios in Victoria. The album was self-produced by band members Dave Genn and Neil Osborne and was mixed at The Warehouse Studios by Warne Livesey.

== Track listing ==
1. "The Chant" – 4:33
2. "Snap" – 4:02
3. "The Scare of Meaning Less" – 3:08
4. "Northern Soul" – 4:11
5. "Where Did the Money Go" – 3:51
6. "One Hundred Songs" – 3:26
7. "Shade Grows" – 3:35
8. "Moonbeach" – 4:12
9. "The Wind Down" – 3:43
10. "To Face Your Eyes" – 3:16
11. "Lucky" – 3:02
