= Trusted by Millions =

Studio album by 54-40
- Released: April 30, 1996
- Recorded: November–December, 1995; Mushroom Studios
- Genre: Alternative rock
- Label: Sony Canada
- Producer: 54-40, Steven Drake

54-40 chronology
Smilin' Buddha Cabaret (1994)	Trusted by Millions (1996)	Sound of Truth: The Independent Collection (1997)

Professional ratings
Review scores
Source	Rating
AllMusic	4/5 stars

Trusted by Millions is the seventh album by Canadian rock band 54-40, released in 1996. Certified Platinum in Canada, it sold over 130,000 copies by the end of 1997.

== Track listing ==
All tracks written by Neil Osborne, Brad Merritt, Phil Comparelli and Matt Johnson.

No.	Title	Length
1.	"Cheer Up Peru"	3:51
2.	"Stick to Milly"	4:05
3.	"Love You All"	4:28
4.	"Crossing a Canyon"	3:58
5.	"Hooked on Bliss"	2:53
6.	"Couldn't Be Sorry"	4:30
7.	"This Is My Haircut"	3:03
8.	"Desperately Seeking Anyone"	3:35
9.	"Frankl's Revenge"	4:28
10.	"I Love Candy"	3:32
11.	"Cry a Little"	7:02
12.	"Lies to Me"	3:20
