= Mo-Da-Mu =

Canadian independent record label

- Founded: 1980; 46 years ago
- Founder: Allen Moy
- Status: Defunct: 1987; 39 years ago
- Genre: Indie
- Country of origin: Canada
- Location: Vancouver, British Columbia

Mo=Da=Mu was a Canadian independent record label founded in 1980 in Vancouver, British Columbia. The music label was established by Allen Moy of the punk rock band Popular Front, and released material by bands such as 54-40, Bolero Lava, Moral Lepers, Animal Slaves, Doomsday Army, Rhythm Mission, and The Work Party.

By 1983, 54-40 were the only profitable act on the label, so Moy and business partner Keith Porteous folded the label in 1987 and instead became 54-40's management team.

== See also ==
- List of record labels
