= Kinnie Starr =

Canadian musician

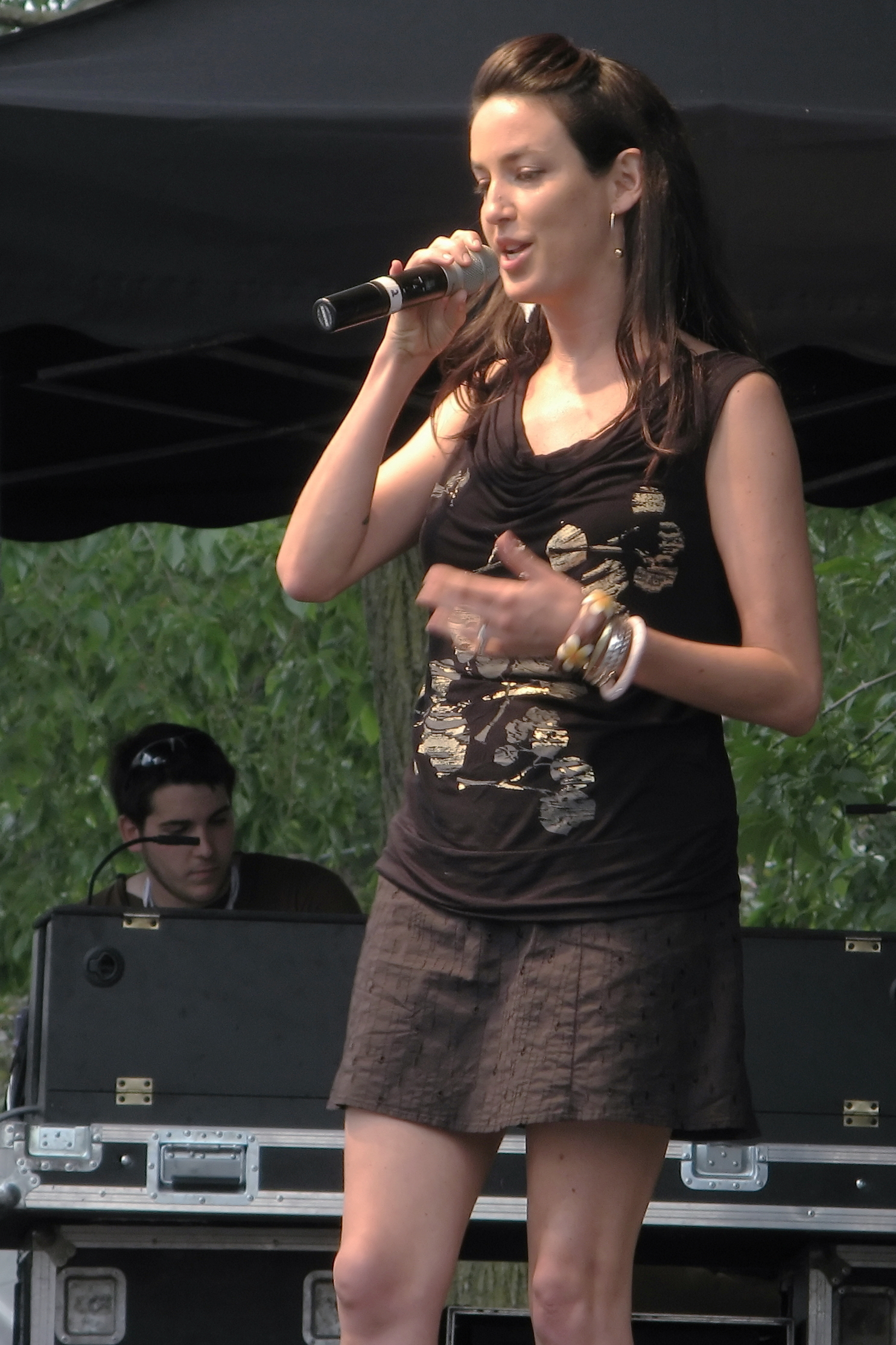
- Starr performing in Ottawa, Ontario at Westfest 2008

Background information
- Born: Alida Kinnie Starr; 1970 (age 55–56)
- Origin: Calgary, Alberta, Canada
- Genres: Canadian hip hop, alternative rock
- Occupations: Singer; rapper
- Years active: 1995–present
- Labels: Aporia Records (current), Mercury/Def Jam
- Website: kinniestarr.ca

Academic background
- Education: Queen's University

Alida Kinnie Starr (born 1970) is a Canadian multidisciplinary singer and rapper.

== Early life ==
Starr was born and raised in Calgary, where she attended Western Canada High School. She is trilingual (English, French and Spanish). Starr has a BA in Race and Gender Studies from Queen's University.

After moving to Vancouver, Starr formed her first band in 1992. According to legend, the true extent of her talent was first revealed on trip to New York City, when a friend pushed her onstage at an East Village club's open-mic night, where her impromptu spoken-word poetry met an enthusiastic reception.

== Career ==
Following a self-released demo called Learning 2 Cook in 1995, she released her debut album Tidy in 1996, mixing rock, punk, pop, and hip-hop, along with her trademark spoken-word poetry. On that album, she rapped in three languages: English, Spanish, and French.

Starr signed to major label group Island/Def Jam in 1997, following a massive bidding war during which Clive Davis personally flew out to dine the young artist to try and sign her to his roster of pop stars. The next year, Seagram bought Polygram, the parent company of Island Def Jam, and merged it into Universal Music Group. In the resulting upheaval, Starr felt she was lost in the shuffle and she asked to be released from her contract. The material she recorded for her first album with Island Def Jam, 1998's Mending was never released, though some record labels have talked of releasing the lost album.

In 1997, Starr appeared on the Lilith Fair tour. In the late '90s and in 2004, she toured Canada with Veda Hille and Oh Susanna as part of the "Scrappy Bitch Tour".

She performed in November 2000 at Lee's Palace in Toronto.

Cirque du Soleil pursued Starr to sing in their productions, and in 2003 she contracted with them to perform in Zumanity for two years. After releasing her 2003 album Sun Again, she moved to Las Vegas. However, she was back home in Canada by the following year, where she continued to perform and record.

In the mid-2000s, Starr began mentoring youth in poetry and beat-making workshops. She taught alongside Sal Ferreras in Vancouver Community College as part of a 5 day artist development series in 2008. She worked as a youth educator through Artstarts In Schools and has been encouraging youth and adults to consider creative expression as important since the mid 2000’s

Her 2013 album "Kiss It" was made available to fans at Vancouver's Queer Arts Festival one week before the official release.

Her 2018 album, Feed the Fire explores finding one's truest self amidst the digital chaos of the 21st century.

=== Musical style and influences ===
Her musical style has been described as "hip hop aggro groove".

Starr has enlisted other Canadian musicians to appear on her albums over the years, including Swollen Members' Moka Only, Coco Love Alcorn, former Dream Warrior Spek and Tegan Quin of Tegan and Sara. Nelly Furtado credits Starr as an influence.

=== Music videos ===
- "Ophelia" Director: Marsha Herle
- "Month of Trickery" Director: Marsha Herle
- "Nearer" Director: Marsha Herle
- "Home is Everywhere" Director: Hannah C
- "Go Go See It" Director: Hannah C
- "High Heels" Director: Hannah C

=== Film ===
Starr's songs have been included on the soundtracks for the TV series The L Word and the movie Thirteen.

In 2001, Starr co-starred in Down and Out with the Dolls, a Kurt Voss movie about a fictional all-girl rock band.

Starr conceived of, and co-produced, the 2016 documentary Play Your Gender, which explores the gender gap in the music industry, asking why only 5% of professional music producers are female. Produced by Sahar Yousefi and directed by Stephanie Clattenburg, the film premiered at the Canberra International Film Festival in Australia. At the 2017 Melbourne Documentary Film Festival the film was awarded "Best Music / Art Documentary" (in a tie). In 2018, the film was screened at the Reeperbahn Festival as part of the "Key Change Festival Initiative".

Starr composed the score for the 2018 Haida language film Edge of the Knife.

== Activism and public speaking ==
Much of Starr's work engages positively with female sexuality, in contrast to male perspectives often associated with hip-hop culture. Starr identifies as bisexual, and has enjoyed popularity in the queer community.

In 2006 she formally became a mentor for aspiring indigenous musicians as a faculty member with the Manitoba Audio Recording Industry Association's Aboriginal Music Program (AMP) Camp.

Starr appeared as a guest on The Rachel Maddow Show on 11 August 2006. On 31 August, her single "Anything" was the first-ever No. 1 single on CBC Radio 3's new countdown show The R3-30.

Starr is an outspoken defender of water rights and a fierce opponent of pipelines. She debuted a song speaking to these subjects during a 2013 performance at Vancouver Folk Music Festival,. A statement from Starr had her further explaining her position on the pipeline: "Misusing water in bitumen and gas extraction has repercussions outside the immediate terrain, yet the government continues to lift protections from water and water life as a way to pave the way to pipeline growth."

Starr has presented on the subject of kindness in society through Emma Talks and has discussed the need for kindness in response to having to deal with a stalker. “We Are Sky”, one of the songs on her album Feed The Fire, speaks to this experience. In 2018, Starr further discussed the importance of kindness, participating in the Kitty Lund Lecture Series at York University.

Starr has been outspoken on the effects of brain injury, after sustaining one herself in 2015, contributing an essay to the 2021 book Impact : Women Writing After Concussion. The book, used to help understand the vastly misunderstood subject of concussion in women, won the 2022 Trade Non-Fiction Book of the Year award by the Book Publishers Association of Alberta.

In 2017, Starr was guest host on the CBC Radio show Tapestry, replacing regular host Shelagh Rogers. The episode focused on brain injury.

== Discography ==
Album	Year	Label	Producer
Learn 2 Cook (demo)	1995		
Tidy	1996		
Mending (Unreleased)	1998	Island/Def Jam	
Tune-Up	2000		
Sun Again	2003	Maple Music	
Anything	2006		
A Different Day	2010	Last Gang	Chin Injeti
Kiss It	2013	Aporia	
From Far Away	2014	Aporia	
Feed the Fire	2018	Aporia	

== Filmography ==
- 2001: Down and Out with the Dolls. Director: Kurt Voss.
- 2016: Play Your Gender (host, curator & co-producer). Director: Stephanie Clattenburg. Producer: Sahar Yousefi.

== Awards and recognition ==
In 2004, Starr was nominated for the Juno Award for New Artist of the Year.

Starr was featured in the Royal British Columbia Museum's major 2008 exhibition, "Free Spirit: Stories of You, Me and BC", as one of 150 cultural icons of BC.

She produced the album We Are... by Digging Roots, which won the Juno Award for Aboriginal Recording of the Year at the Juno Awards of 2010.

In 2011, Starr was honoured as a pioneer in Canadian hip hop culture by the ManifesTO festival.

Year	Nominated work	Award	Result
2004	Sun Again	Juno Awards, New Artist of the Year	Nominated
2010	Digging Roots' album We Are... (Producer)	Juno Awards, Aboriginal Album of the Year	Won
2014	Haida Raid 3: Save Our Waters — Kinnie Starr (Musician) & Amanda Strong (Director)	imagineNATIVE Film and Media Arts Festival, Best Music Video	Won
2019	Edge of the Knife (Composer)	Leo Awards, Best Musical Score, Motion Picture	Nominated

== See also ==
- Canadian hip hop
- First Nations music
