= Bend Sinister (EP) =

EP by Bend Sinister
- Released: September 14, 2007
- Recorded: 2006–2007
- Genres: Indie rock, prog-rock
- Length: 20:15
- Label: Storyboard Records
- Producer: Shawn Cole

Bend Sinister chronology
Through the Broken City (2005)	Bend Sinister (2007)	Stories of Brothers, Tales of Lovers (2008)

Bend Sinister is the third release EP by Vancouver band, Bend Sinister released on September 14, 2007. The video for the first single, "Time Breaks Down", received moderate play on Muchmusic and was nominated for CBC Radio 3's 2007 Video of the Year Bucky award.

== Track listing ==
1. Yours Truly - 3:05
2. T.V War - 3:57
3. Time Breaks Down - 3:49
4. High Horses- 3:25
5. Julianna - 6:39

== Personnel ==
- Dan Moxon – Lead vocals, organ
- Jon Bunyan – guitar, keyboards, vocals
- Naben Ruthnum – Lead guitar
- Dave Buck – bass
- Kevin Keegan – drums (Track 1, 3 & 5)
- Mike Magnusson – drums (Track 2 & 4)
