= Robert Youds =

Canadian artist

- Born: 1954 (age 71–72)
- Known for: Sculpture/Painting
- Website: robertyouds.ca

Robert Youds (born 1954) is a Canadian artist based in Victoria, British Columbia.

== Life ==
Robert Youds was born in 1954 in Burnaby, British Columbia.With Light: Robert Youds "Since the 1980s, Robert Youds has conducted a singular investigation of the material conditions of the pictorial—a path that has led him from paintings with cut-out apertures through stretched lines of colour made of strands of latex and velvet cushions bound with ropes through to his recent constructions incorporating fluorescent, neon and LED lights".Barry Schwabsky. He holds an MFA from York University and a BFA from the University of Victoria.

== Exhibitions ==
Youds' solo exhibitions include: 2017 For Everyone a Fountain, Open Space, Victoria, BC, 2015 Say nothing, twice, Diaz Contemporary, Toronto, ON, 2014 - 2015 For Everyone a Sunset, Vancouver Art Gallery OffSite, Vancouver, BC 2002 Chicago International Art Fair, Feature exhibit, Post Gallery, Los Angeles, CA 2002 Post Gallery, Los Angeles, CA 1995 Forse Che Si, Forse Che No, The Power Plant, curated by Greg Bellerby, catalogue essay by Willard Holmes

- Jesus Green Tofino Sunset at Diaz Contemporary in Toronto
- beautiful beautiful artificial field at the Art Gallery of Greater Victoria

Selected group shows include: 2019 Garden in the Machine, Surrey Art Gallery, Surrey, BC 2015 The Transformation of Landscape Art in Canada: The Inside and Outside of Being, Today Art Museum, Beijing, China, 2013 Rewilding Modernity, Mendel Art Gallery, Saskatoon, SK 2000 spilled edge soft corners, Galerie Christiane Chassay, Montreal, curated by Barbara Fischer 1999 Five Continents and One City, Museum of Mexico City, Mexico 1999 Les Peintures, Galerie Rene Blouin, Montreal, QC 1999 Postmark: An Abstract Effect, Site Santa Fe, Santa Fe, NM 1999 twistfoldlayerflake, Oliver Art Center, CCAC Institute, Oakland, CA 1997 L.A. International, Biennial Art Invitational, Post Gallery, CA 1996 Topographies, aspects of recent B.C. art, Vancouver Art Gallery, Vancouver, BC

- The Shape of Colour: Excursions in Colour Field Art 1950-2005 at the Art Gallery of Ontario.

== Collections ==
Robert Youds' work is included in the permanent collections of the National Gallery of Canada and the Vancouver Art Gallery.
