= Sound Document =

- Founded: 2004
- Founder: Doug Phillips; Dani Vachon
- Genre: Indie
- Country of origin: Canada
- Location: Vancouver, British Columbia
- Official website: sounddocument.com

Sound Document is an independent record label based in Vancouver, British Columbia, Canada. The music label signs only Canadian bands with the label's current genre focus of dance-punk/indie rock. It was founded in 2004 by Dani Vachon and Doug Phillips. In 2006 the label became a sole proprietorship of Dani Vachon.

Artists include You Say Party! We Say Die!, Bakelite, Cadeaux and Hot Loins.

== See also ==
- List of record labels
