= Since When =

Studio album by 54-40
- Released: June 30, 1998
- Genre: Alternative rock
- Label: Columbia
- Producer: GGGarth

54-40 chronology
Sound of Truth: The Independent Collection (1997)	Since When (1998)	Heavy Mellow (1999)

Professional ratings
Review scores
Source	Rating
AllMusic	3/5 stars

Since When is a 1998 album by Canadian rock band 54-40. It marks the band's return to the more acoustic folk rock sound of their 1980s albums. The album was the highest-charting album in the band's history, peaking at No. 19 on the RPM Canadian Albums Chart. Also, the album's lead single and title track, "Since When", is the highest-charting single in the band's history. The album features the song "Stormy", which had been written in the early 1990s.

== Track listing ==
1. "In Your Image" – 3:52
2. "Lost and Lazy" – 3:17
3. "Since When" – 4:14
4. "I Could Give You More" – 3:31
5. "You Should Come Over" – 3:37
6. "Runaway John" – 2:18
7. "Pay for Living" – 3:17
8. "Angel in My Bed" – 3:24
9. "Playground" – 2:23
10. "Greatest Mistake" – 3:26
11. "Stormy" – 5:31
12. "Last People on Earth" – 2:10
13. "Extra Special Mystery Bonus Track" – 1:25
