= 54-40 (band) =

Canadian rock band

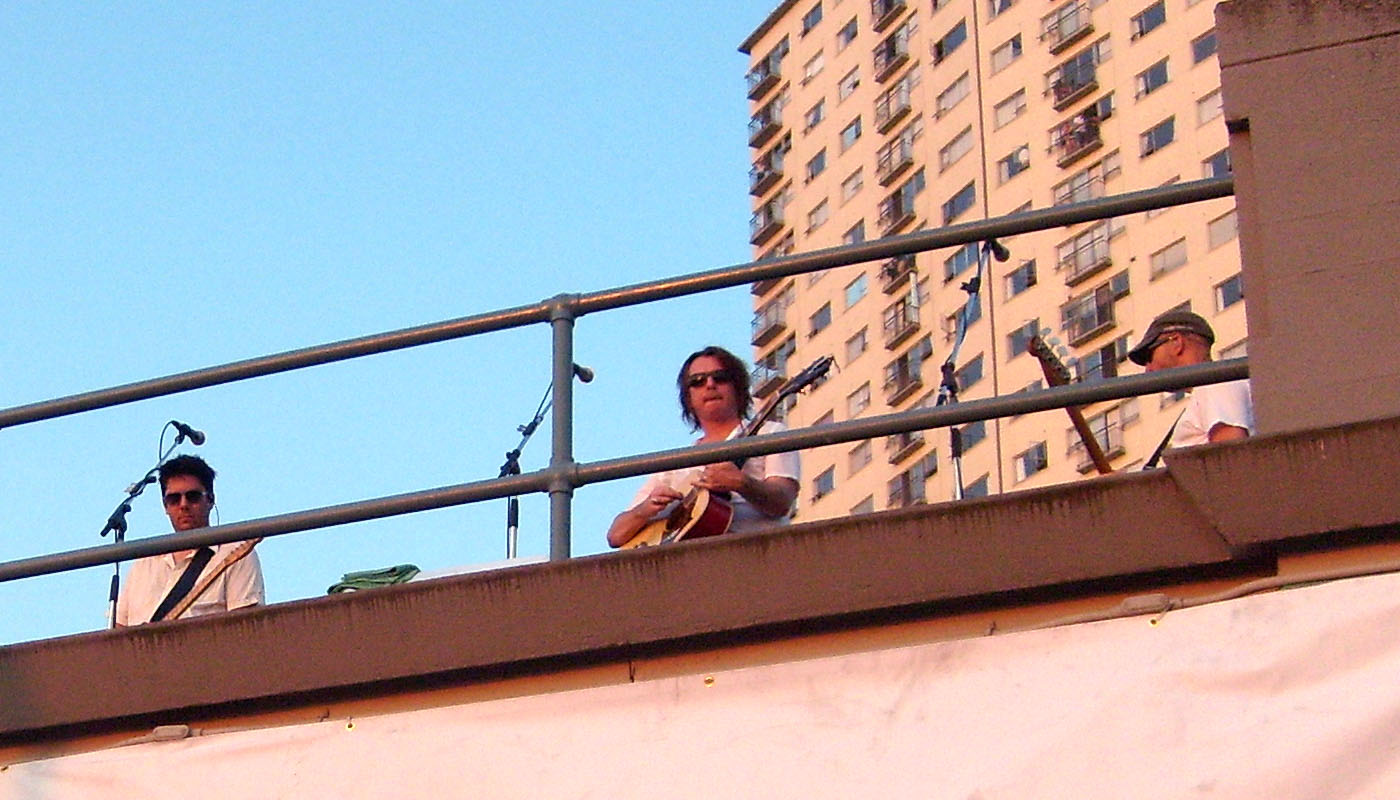
- Dave Genn, Neil Osborne and Brad Merritt at the Vancouver ShoreFest in 2009

Background information
- Origin: Tsawwassen, Delta, British Columbia, Canada
- Genres: Rock; alternative rock; jangle pop; roots rock
- Years active: 1980–present
- Labels: Reprise; Columbia; True North
- Members: Neil Osborne; Matt Johnson; Brad Merritt; Dave Genn; David Osborne
- Past members: Phil Comparelli; Darryl Neudorf; Ian Franey
- Website: 5440.com

54-40 (often stylized 54•40) is a Canadian rock band from Tsawwassen, Delta, British Columbia. The band takes its name from the slogan "54-40 or Fight!", coined to express the unsuccessful expansionist agenda of James K. Polk's presidency, which was intent upon controlling a contested U.S.-Canada border area in the Oregon boundary dispute. 54-40 has had a successful career, with four of their albums being certified platinum in Canada. The band has been nominated for eight Juno Awards. Between 1996 and 2016, 54-40 were among the top 150 best-selling Canadian artists in Canada and among the top 50 best-selling Canadian bands in Canada.

== History ==
Neil Osborne and Brad Merritt met in 1978 at South Delta High School in Tsawwassen, British Columbia. After studying at the Berklee College of Music in Boston, Osborne returned home and formed the band 54-40 with Merritt and drummer Ian Franey. The band played their first gig in Coquitlam on December 8, 1980, the night John Lennon was killed. In 1981 they made their first recordings for the Mo-Da-Mu label, with four tracks appearing on the independent compilation LP Things Are Still Coming Ashore, which also featured music by Vancouver bands Animal Slaves and Junco Run. In June 1982, the band released the EP Selection. Shortly after the release of Selection, Franey left the band. Franey was replaced by Darryl Neudorf and Phil Comparelli was added on guitar, trumpet and vocals. The band recorded the album Set the Fire in 1983, releasing it in 1984. Neudorf, frustrated with the band's prolonged time in the studio and away from the road, left the band in 1985. He was replaced by Matt Johnson.

The band's self-titled second album, released in 1986 through Warner/Reprise Records, began to attract attention from radio and record buyers across Canada, with the singles "Baby Ran" and "I Go Blind" gaining significant college radio airplay. Dave Osborne (keyboards, harmonica), toured and recorded with the band from 1987 to 1993. The band's third album, Show Me, became their commercial breakthrough in Canada, with the hits "One Day in Your Life" and "One Gun".

Although the band was popular on college radio in the United States, they never had a commercial breakthrough, and Warner dropped 54-40 in 1990. In 1991, the band released the compilation album, Sweeter Things. Also during that year, the band signed a deal with Sony and released Dear Dear in 1992. It was the band's first album to be certified Gold in Canada and was certified Platinum in 1993. The band released Smilin' Buddha Cabaret in 1994 and Trusted by Millions in 1996, both of which would later be certified Platinum.

The band's song "I Go Blind" was covered in the mid-1990s by American band Hootie & the Blowfish, and the cover was featured on the first soundtrack to the TV series Friends. The song also appears on two compilations released by the band: 2000's Scattered, Smothered and Covered and 2003's The Best of Hootie & the Blowfish (1993 Thru 2003). Royalties from the Hootie and the Blowfish cover enabled the band to build their own recording studio in Vancouver.

Dave Genn, formerly of Matthew Good Band, joined 54-40 in 2003. In February 2005, it was announced that Comparelli left the band for personal reasons. That same year, 54-40 signed with True North Records.

In 2010, to celebrate the band's 30 years together and almost 25 years since their first commercial album The Green Album, the band went on a promotional concert tour with a two-set act. The first set was The Green Album from start to finish. The second set was one song from every album since, with the exception of Dear Dear where they played two songs. 54-40 also performed a new song from their upcoming record, Lost in the City, which was released on June 14, 2011.

In January 2016, the band released a greatest hits album titled La Difference: A History Unplugged. Tracks included "One Day In Your Life", "I Go Blind", and "Ocean Pearl". The album was released through eOne Music. The band then set out on a month-long theatre tour across Canada to support the album. In 2017 they played at Peachfest in Penticton.

In 2018 54-40 performed with fiddler Daniel Lapp, both locally and also as the opening band at Ottawa's CityFolk Festival.

Lead singer Neil Osborne began playing shows with his daughter, singer-songwriter Kandle, billing themselves as A Family Curse, self-described as "pure folk-art worked from found objects (something old, something new)." A Toronto show took place May 8, 2019 at the intimate and tiny 20-capacity Radical Road Brewing Co. The father-daughter duo played later that year on August 7, 2019 as part of Roy Thompson Hall's Live on the Patio series, also in Toronto. These shows were bookended by shows in Montréal, where Kandle resides, in February and August 2019.

54-40 played the legendary Horseshoe Tavern's 72nd anniversary party on December 6, 2019. Sam Cash, son of Toronto post-punk musician turned city politician Andrew Cash, opened the show.

== Members ==
Current

- Neil Osborne – vocals, rhythm guitar (1980–present), lead guitar (1981–1983)
- Dave Genn – lead guitar (2003–present)
- Brad Merrit – bass (1980–present)
- Matt Johnson – drums (1986–present)
- David Osborne - organ, saxophone, harmonica (2015-present)

Former

- Ian Franey – drums (1980–1983)
- Phil Comparelli – lead guitar, vocals, trumpet (1983–2005)
- Darryl Neudorf – drums (1983–1986)

== Discography ==
=== EPs ===
Year	Title	Chart positions
Year	Title	CAN
1982	Selection	—
2025	Virgil	—

=== Albums ===
Year	Title	Peak chart positions	Certifications
Year	Title	CAN	CAN
1984	Set the Fire	—	—
1986	54-40	91	—
1987	Show Me	66	—
1989	Fight for Love	36	—
1992	Dear Dear	22	Platinum
1994	Smilin' Buddha Cabaret	47	Platinum
1996	Trusted by Millions	28	Platinum
1998	Since When	18	Gold
2000	Casual Viewin'	24	—
2003	Goodbye Flatland	—	—
2005	Yes to Everything	—	—
2008	Northern Soul	—	—
2011	Lost in the City	—	—
2018	Keep On Walking	—	—
2024	West Coast Band	—	—
2026	PORTO	—	—

=== Singles ===
Year	Title	Peak chart positions			Album
Year	Title	CAN	CAN Rock/Alt.	CAN Content (Cancon)	Album
1984	"Set the Fire"	—	—	—	Set the Fire
1984	"What to Do Now"	—	—	—	Set the Fire
1984	"Broken Pieces"	—	—	—	Set the Fire
1986	"Baby Ran"	—	—	—	54-40
1986	"I Go Blind"	—	—	—	54-40
1986	"I Wanna Know"	—	—	—	54-40
1987	"Walk in Line"	—	—	—	Show Me
1988	"One Day in Your Life"	90	—	—	Show Me
1988	"One Gun"	—	—	30	Show Me
1989	"Miss You"	50	—	—	Fight for Love
1989	"Baby, Have Some Faith"	—	—	1	Fight for Love
1990	"Over My Head"	—	—	1	Fight for Love
1992	"Nice to Luv You"	30	—	4	Dear Dear
1992	"She La"	38	—	—	Dear Dear
1992	"Music Man"	40	—	5	Dear Dear
1993	"You Don't Get Away (That Easy)"	52	—	7	Dear Dear
1993	"We Are, We Pretend"	—	—	2	Dear Dear
1994	"Blame Your Parents"	13	—	—	Smilin' Buddha Cabaret
1994	"Assoholic"	56	—	—	Smilin' Buddha Cabaret
1994	"Ocean Pearl"	22	—	—	Smilin' Buddha Cabaret
1994	"Lucy"	—	—	—	Smilin' Buddha Cabaret
1995	"Radio Luv Song"	—	—	—	Smilin' Buddha Cabaret
1996	"Love You All"	20	7	—	Trusted by Millions
1996	"Lies to Me"	19	5	—	Trusted by Millions
1996	"Crossing a Canyon"	30	—	—	Trusted by Millions
1997	"I Love Candy"	61	—	—	Trusted by Millions
1998	"Since When"	11	2	—	Since When
1998	"Lost and Lazy"	87	8	—	Since When
2000	"Casual Viewin'"	48	3	—	Casual Viewin
2000	"Unbend"	—	—	—	Casual Viewin
2001	"Blue Sky"	—	—	—	Casual Viewin
2002	"Love Rush"	—	—	—	Radio Love Songs: The Singles Collection
2002	"Plenty Emotion"	—	—	—	Radio Love Songs: The Singles Collection
2003	"Animal in Pain"	—	—	—	Goodbye Flatland
2003	"Take Me Out"	—	—	—	Goodbye Flatland
2003	"Ride"	—	—	—	Goodbye Flatland
2003	"Wish I Knew"	—	—	—	Goodbye Flatland
2005	"Easy to Love"	—	10	—	Yes to Everything
2005	"Golden Sun"	—	—	—	Yes to Everything
2008	"Snap"	—	47	—	Northern Soul
2011	"Lost in the City"	—	—	—	Lost in the City
2014	"The Waiting"	—	—	—	Keep On Walking
2017	"Keep On Walking"	—	—	—	Keep On Walking
2017	"Sucker for Your Love"	—	—	—	Keep On Walking
2021	"Embassy Supreme"	—	—	—	
2025	"Running for the Fence"	—	—	—	PORTO

=== Live ===
Year	Title	Chart positions
Year	Title	CAN
1999	Heavy Mellow	—
2023	Live At El Mocambo	—

=== Compilations ===
Year	Title	Peak chart positions	Certifications
Year	Title	CAN	CAN
1981	Things Are Still Coming Ashore	-	-
1991	Sweeter Things: A Compilation	39	Platinum
1997	Sound of Truth: The Independent Collection	-	-
2001	Casual Viewin' USA	-	-
2002	Radio Love Songs: The Singles Collection	48	-
2005	The Essentials	-	-
2016	LA Difference: A History Unplugged	-	-

=== DVDs ===
- 2006 – This Is Here This Is Now
