= Smilin' Buddha Cabaret =

Studio album by 54-40
- Released: April 5, 1994 (Canada); January, 1995 (International)
- Genre: Alternative rock
- Length: 46:21
- Label: Columbia Records
- Producer: 54-40, Don Smith

54-40 chronology
Dear Dear (1992)	Smilin' Buddha Cabaret (1994)	Trusted by Millions (1996)

Singles from Smilin' Buddha Cabaret
- 1. "Blame Your Parents" Released: 1994; 2. "Assoholic" Released: 1994; 3. "Ocean Pearl" Released: 1994; 4. "Lucy" Released: 1994; 5. "Radio Luv Song" Released: 1995

Professional ratings
Review scores
Source	Rating
AllMusic	3/5 stars

Smilin' Buddha Cabaret is an album by Canadian rock band 54-40. The album is named after a live music club Smilin Buddha Cabaret at 109 East Hastings in Vancouver, British Columbia. The club's iconic neon sign, now found at the Museum of Vancouver, is featured on the album's cover. The singles released from the album were "Blame Your Parents", "Assoholic", "Ocean Pearl" and "Radio Luv Song".

== Track listing ==
1. "Blame Your Parents" – 4:26
2. "Radio Luv Song" – 2:08
3. "Assoholic" – 3:39
4. "Daisy" – 2:17
5. "Once a Killer" – 3:46
6. "Punk Grass" – 2:35
7. "Lucy" – 3:04
8. "Beyond the Outsider" – 3:27
9. "Don't Listen to That" – 2:27
10. "Ocean Pearl" – 3:25
11. "Higher" – 2:32
12. "Friends End" – 4:06
13. "What Buddy Was" – 4:24
14. "Save Yourself" – 4:05
