= Spring Romance (EP) =

EP by Bend Sinister
- Released: June 2, 2010
- Genre: Indie Rock
- Length: 15:31
- Label: Distort
- Producer: Howard Redekopp

Spring Romance is the second EP and fifth studio release from the band Bend Sinister.

== Reception ==
Professional ratings
Review scores
Source	Rating
Press+1	4/5 stars

The opening track "Things Will Get Better" was named as #10 on Grant Lawrence's top 10 songs of 2010 on his weekly CBC Radio 3 Podcast. Lawrence describes the track as "a timeless rocker that would be the ultimate season ending dance finale on Glee."

== Track listing ==
1. "Things Will Get Better" - 3:17
2. "Change Your Mind" - 3:04
3. "The Little Things" - 3:03
4. "Don't Let Us Bring You Down" - 2:58
5. "Spring Romance" - 3:09

== Personnel ==
- Dan Moxon - Lead vocals/Piano
- Jason Dana - Drums
- Joel Myers - Bass
- Henry Alcock White - Guitar/Vocals
- Joseph Blood - Guitar/Vocals

=== Production ===
- Howard Redekopp - Producer, Engineer, Mixer
- Jarett Holmes - Assistant Engineer
