= Dear Dear =

Studio album by 54-40
- Released: May 12, 1992
- Genre: Alternative rock
- Length: 54:40
- Label: Columbia
- Producer: Don Smith

54-40 chronology
Sweeter Things: A Compilation (1991)	Dear Dear (1992)	Smilin' Buddha Cabaret (1994)

Professional ratings
Review scores
Source	Rating
AllMusic	2.5/5 stars

Dear Dear is an album by Canadian rock band 54-40, released in 1992. It was their most successful album in their native Canada, spawning the singles "Nice to Luv You", "She La", "Music Man", "You Don't Get Away (That Easy)" and "We Are, We Pretend". The album was certified platinum in Canada in April 1993. However, Dear Dear was their first album not to have an American release after several years of not breaking through in the United States market.

The album was recorded in Tom Petty's studio in California.

Including the blank space on track 11 between "Dear Dear" and the hidden track "Social Work", the album's running time when displayed on a CD player is 54:40.

The band received three Juno Award nominations at the Juno Awards of 1993, for Group of the Year, Video of the Year for "She-La", and Album Design of the Year.

== Track listing ==
1. "She La" – 4:10
2. "Music Man" – 5:43
3. "Nice to Luv You" – 4:22
4. "Lovers & Losers" – 4:19
5. "We Are, We Pretend" – 3:11
6. "Apollo & Me" – 4:18
7. "Faithful" – 4:04
8. "Inside the Horn" – 3:20
9. "You Don't Get Away (That Easy)" – 4:25
10. "Book" – 4:38
11. "Dear Dear" – 4:46
12. "Untitled" (Hidden Track) - 2:59
13. "Social Work" (Hidden Track) - 4:25
