= David Dyment =

Canadian author and academic

- Born: David Dyment
- Writing career
- Notable work: Doing the Continental: A New Canadian-American Relationship
- Website: www.daviddyment.com

David Dyment is a Canadian author and academic based in Ottawa, Canada. At Carleton University, he’s been an Assistant Professor and later a Senior Research Associate and has taught Canadian foreign policy at the Norman Paterson School of International Affairs. He has been a deputy director at Global Affairs Canada and has worked on the staff of the Governor General of Canada. He is a director of Canadian International Council.

== Biography ==
He received his doctorate from the Université de Montréal.

He is the author of Doing the Continental: A New Canadian-American Relationship, published by Dundurn Press in 2010. In May 2011, the book was listed on Quill & Quire's bestseller list for non-fiction politics. A review by Conrad Black appeared in the May 2011 issue of the Literary Review of Canada.

He is a contributor to The Globe and Mail, the Toronto Star, the Vancouver Sun, and other Canadian newspapers. He has been a commentator on CTV, CBC Television, CBC Radio, Télévision de Radio-Canada and the BBC.
