= Show Me (54-40 album) =

Studio album by 54-40
- Released: 1987
- Genre: Alternative rock
- Length: 48:11
- Label: Warner
- Producer: Dave Jerden

54-40 chronology
54•40 (1986)	Show Me (1987)	Fight for Love (1989)

Singles from Show Me
- 1. "Walk in Line" Released: 1987; 2. "One Day in Your Life" Released: 1988; 3. "One Gun" Released: 1988

Show Me is an album by the Canadian alternative rock band 54-40, released in 1987. The album contains the singles "One Day in Your Life" and "One Gun", both of which were hits in Canada. Neil Osborne has stated that Show Me is his least favourite record.

== Production ==
The album was produced by Dave Jerden and was recorded in Los Angeles. According to Osborne, the album cost $250,000 to make, and Osborne has stated that he thought the album was "overproduced."

== Critical reception ==
Professional ratings
Review scores
Source	Rating
AllMusic	3/5 stars

The Globe and Mail wrote that "the wrenching overdrive guitar, touches of synthetic coloring, pale vocals and abstract political/spiritual concerns bring to mind an odd combination of Neil Young and the Cult." The Toronto Star called the album "punk music gone soft around the edges." The Gazette deemed it "a sometimes confrontational sound couched in dreamlike atmospherics."

Show Me was nominated for a CASBY Award for "Album of the Year".

== Track listing ==
All lyrics by Neil Osborne. All music by 54-40.

1. "One Day in Your Life" - 4:14
2. "Get Back Down" - 4:12
3. "Walk in Line" - 4:21
4. "Standing in the Way" - 3:46
5. "Everyday" - 4:18
6. "What's in a Name" - 4:50
7. "One Gun" - 4:14
8. "Come Here" - 3:25
9. "Because of You" - 2:53
10. "Open Fire" - 3:08 (not included on original vinyl release)
11. "All the Love Is Gone" - 4:42
12. "Show Me" - 3:47
