= 54-40 (album) =

Studio album by 54-40
- Released: July 1986
- Genre: Alternative rock
- Length: 36:58
- Label: Reprise
- Producer: 54-40 and Dave Ogilvie

54-40 chronology
Set the Fire (1984)	54-40 (1986)	Show Me (1987)

Singles from 54-40
- 1. "Baby Ran" Released: 1986; 2. "I Go Blind" Released: 1986; 3. "I Wanna Know" Released: 1986

Professional ratings
Review scores
Source	Rating
AllMusic	4.5/5 stars

54-40 is an album by Canadian alternative rock band 54-40. The album was recorded independently and was released in 1986 as their major-label debut. The album is nicknamed "The Green Album" by fans because the album artwork consists of mostly green fill. The album featured the hit singles "Baby Ran" and "I Go Blind". The latter song was later covered by Hootie & the Blowfish. The album was nominated for "Album of the Year" at the 1987 CASBY Awards.

== Track listing ==
1. "Baby Ran" – 4:33
2. "I Wanna Know" – 4:14
3. "I Go Blind" – 2:46
4. "Being Fooled" – 3:19
5. "Take My Hand" – 4:35
6. "Grace and Beauty" – 2:58
7. "Me Island" – 5:11
8. "Holy Cow" – 3:56
9. "Alcohol Heart" – 4:21
10. "Untitled" – 1:05
