= Dave Dyment =

Canadian artist and curator

Dave Dyment is a Canadian artist and curator in Sackville, New Brunswick.

Dyment was the 2008 artist-in-residence at the Glenfiddich distillery in Dufftown, Scotland and was an Chalmers Arts Fellow in 2009. He is the co-director of Struts Gallery & Faucet Media Arts Centre in Sackville.

== Publications ==
- Students Draw Scenes Scenes From Movies That Were Filmed At Their School. Artist Publication. Winter 2013.
- Old Man Deciphering a Briefcase. C Magazine. Artist Project. Spring 2013.
- Spiral Jetée (for CM and KH). Blue Note Book Vol 7 No. 1. Bristol. Uk. October 2012.
- Hofercrate. Artist publication. Summer 2012.
- No Expectations. Artist Book. Fall 2011.
- Pop Quiz. Paul+Wendy Projects, 2010.
- Sgt Pepper’s Extended Lonely Hearts Club Band. Paul+Wendy Projects, 2009.
- CCL1. Centre for Culture and Leisure #1. Summer 2008. Exhibition catalogue.
- House Projects. Dublin, Ireland, December 2007. Exhibition Catalogue.
- Disquiet Modern Fuel, Kingston, September 2005. Exhibition Catalogue, Audio CD
- Free Sample Mount Saint Vincent. January 2005. Exhibition Catalogue.
- Almanac Banff Centre, Calgary, December 2005
- QSL Radio Broadcast/Publication, MIMA, UK, Summer 2004
- Aural Cultures. YYZ Books, Spring 2004. Audio piece on accompanying CD.
- Very Short Stories. Off the Cut Press, artist project, December 2003
- 5’9", Calgary, artist project, Summer 2003
- New Life for Fire (collaboration with Lee Ranaldo of Sonic Youth), Summer 2003. Audio CD.
- TuTu, Glasgow, artist project, Scotland, Summer 2003
- FUSE Magazine, artist project, January 2003
- Instant Coffee Screensaver, October 2002
- Mix Magazine, artist project, 2001
- Instant Coffee Currency Project, 2001

== Gallery Representation ==
Dyment is currently represented by MKG127 in Toronto.
