= Nice to Luv You =

Single by 54-40

from the album Dear Dear
- Released: May 9, 1992
- Genre: Rock
- Length: 4:22
- Label: Columbia
- Songwriter(s): Phil Comparelli, Matt Johnson, Brad Merritt, Neil Osborne
- Producer(s): Don Smith

54-40 singles chronology
"Baby, Have Some Faith" (1989)	"Nice to Luv You" (1992)	"She La" (1992)

"Nice to Luv You" is the first single by Canadian rock group 54-40 from the band's 1992 album, Dear Dear.

== Charts ==
Year	Peak Chart Position	
Year	CAN	CAN Content (Cancon)
1992	30	4
