= Love You All =

Single by 54-40

from the album Trusted by Millions
- Released: May 6, 1996
- Recorded: November–December, 1995
- Studio: Mushroom Studios
- Genre: Rock
- Length: 4:28
- Songwriter(s): Phil Comparelli, Matt Johnson, Brad Merritt, Neil Osborne
- Producer(s): 54-40, Steven Drake

54-40 singles chronology
"Radio Luv Song" (1995)	"Love You All" (1996)	"Lies to Me" (1996)

"Love You All" is a song by Canadian rock group 54-40. It was released as the lead single from the band's seventh studio album, Trusted by Millions. The song was featured on the compilation album Hit Zone 2.

== Charts ==
Chart (1996)	Peak position
Canadian RPM Top Singles	20
Canadian RPM Alternative	7
