= Casual Viewin' =

Studio album by 54-40
- Released: August 22, 2000
- Genre: Alternative rock
- Length: 60:09
- Labels: Columbia, Sony Music Entertainment
- Producers: Neil Osborne, Matt Johnson

54-40 chronology
| Heavy Mellow (1999) | Casual Viewin' (2000) | Casual Viewin' USA (2001) |

Casual Viewin' is a 2000 album by Canadian alternative rock band 54-40. The title refers to a lyric from the Genesis song "Broadway Melody of 1974", which reads: "Marshall McLuhan, casual viewin', head buried in the sand." 54-40 commented in interviews at the time of the album's release that they were influenced by McLuhan's work when making the album, and that they adopted the Genesis lyric as a result.

The album was supported with a national tour, starting in early 2001.

The album was a Juno Award nominee for Best Rock Album at the Juno Awards of 2001.

== Track listing ==
1. "Casual Viewin'" – 4:43
2. "Unbend" – 3:49
3. "Blue Sky" – 4:05
4. "Sunday Girl" – 4:39
5. "Roll Up Rule" – 4:23
6. "She's a Jones" – 4:24
7. "It's Alright" – 3:45
8. "Watching You" – 4:44
9. "Say My Name" – 4:40
10. "Speak What You Feel" – 5:10
11. "Someone's Mind" – 3:28
12. "You the One" – 4:22
13. "Big You Up" – 3:57
14. "Castles" – 3:54
