= She La =

Single by 54-40

from the album Dear Dear
- Released: 1992
- Genre: Rock
- Length: 4:10
- Label: Columbia
- Songwriter(s): Phil Comparelli, Matt Johnson, Brad Merritt, Neil Osborne
- Producer(s): Don Smith

54-40 singles chronology
"Nice to Luv You" (1992)	"She La" (1992)	"Music Man" (1992)

"She La" is a song by Canadian rock group 54-40, released as the second single from the band's 1992 album, Dear Dear. The song peaked at No. 38 on the RPM Canadian Singles Chart.

== Track listing ==
1. She La
2. You Don't Get Away (That Easy)
3. Book

== Music video ==
The music video for "She La" was directed by Curtis Wehrfritz. The video won the award for "Best Video" at the 1992 MuchMusic Video Awards. The video was also nominated for "Best Video" at the 1993 Juno Awards.
