= Ocean Pearl =

Single by 54-40

from the album Smilin' Buddha Cabaret
- Released: 1994
- Genre: Rock
- Length: 3:25
- Label: Reprise
- Songwriter(s): Phil Comparelli, Matt Johnson, Brad Merritt, Neil Osborne
- Producer(s): 54-40, Don Smith

54-40 singles chronology
"Assoholic" (1994)	"Ocean Pearl" (1994)	"Radio Luv Song" (1995)

"Ocean Pearl" is a song by Canadian rock group 54-40. The song was released as the third single from the band's 1994 album, Smilin' Buddha Cabaret. The song was very successful in the band's native Canada, peaking at No. 22 on the RPM Top Singles chart. It is considered to be one of the band's signature songs.
