= Lies to Me =

Single by 54-40

from the album Trusted by Millions
- Released: 1996
- Recorded: November–December, 1995; Mushroom Studios
- Genre: Alternative rock
- Length: 3:20
- Songwriter(s): Phil Comparelli, Matt Johnson, Brad Merritt, Neil Osborne
- Producer(s): 54-40, Steven Drake

54-40 singles chronology
"Love You All" (1996)	"Lies to Me" (1996)	"Crossing a Canyon" (1996)

"Lies to Me" is the second single by Canadian rock group 54-40 from the band's seventh studio album, Trusted by Millions.

== Charts ==
Chart (1996)	Peak position
Canadian RPM Top Singles	19
Canadian RPM Alternative	5
