= Since When (song) =

Single by 54-40

from the album Since When
- Released: 1998
- Genre: Rock
- Length: 4:14
- Label: Columbia
- Songwriter(s): Phil Comparelli, Matt Johnson, Brad Merritt, Neil Osborne

54-40 singles chronology
"I Love Candy" (1997)	"Since When" (1998)	"Lost and Lazy" (1998)

"Since When" is a song by Canadian rock band 54-40. The song is the first single and title track of the band's eighth studio album, Since When. The song is the highest-charting single in the band's history, peaking at No. 11 on the RPM singles chart in Canada. The song won the award for "Best Song" at the West Coast Music Awards, with the song's music video winning the award for "Best Video".

== Charts ==
Chart (1998)	Peak position
Canadian RPM Singles Chart	11
Canadian RPM Alternative 30	2
