= I Go Blind =

Single by 54-40

from the album 54-40
- Released: 1986
- Genre: Alternative rock
- Length: 2:46
- Label: Reprise
- Songwriters: Neil Osborne; Phil Comparelli; Brad Merritt; Darryl Neudorf
- Producers: 54-40; Dave Ogilvie

54-40 singles chronology
"Baby Ran" (1986)	"I Go Blind" (1986)	"One Day in Your Life" (1987)

"I Go Blind" is a song by Canadian alternative rock group 54-40. The song was released in Canada as the second single from the band's 1986 self-titled album, 54-40. It has since become one of the band's most popular songs.

== Hootie & the Blowfish cover ==
The song was recorded by American band Hootie & the Blowfish and originally released as a B-side on the band's "Hold My Hand" single. The cover was later released on the soundtrack of the TV series Friends. The cover became a radio hit in 1996, peaking at No. 2 on the Adult Top 40 chart and at No. 22 on Billboard's Adult Contemporary chart. The Hootie version also charted on Canada's RPM Singles Chart, peaking at No. 13.

The song was featured on the band's compilation albums Scattered, Smothered and Covered (2000) and The Best of Hootie & the Blowfish: 1993–2003 (2003).

=== Weekly charts ===
Chart (1996–1997)	Peak position
Canada Top Singles (RPM)	13
US Adult Contemporary (Billboard)	22
US Adult Pop Airplay (Billboard)	2
US Pop Airplay (Billboard)	17
US Radio Songs (Billboard)	13

=== Year-end charts ===
Chart (1997)	Position
US Adult Top 40 (Billboard)	11
