= 2026 United States Senate special election in Ohio =

- November 3, 2026

Nominee	Sherrod Brown	Jon Husted
Party	Democratic	Republican
Popular vote	2,323,001	2,090,390
Percentage	50.09%	45.07%
- Brown: 40–50% 50–60% 60–70% 70–80% Husted: 40–50% 50–60% 60–70% 70–80%
U.S. senator before election
Jon Husted (Note: JD Vance was elected Vice President of the United States in the 2024 presidential election. He resigned his Senate seat on January 10, 2025. Governor Mike DeWine appointed Lieutenant Governor Jon Husted as an interim successor.)
Republican
Elected U.S. senator
Sherrod Brown
Democratic

The 2026 United States Senate special election in Ohio was held on November 3, 2026, to elect a member of the United States Senate to represent the state of Ohio. Democratic former senator Sherrod Brown defeated Republican appointee Jon Husted. He will complete the term won in 2022 by JD Vance, who resigned in 2025 to become vice president.

Seeking to keep the seat after his appointment, Husted ran unopposed for the Republican nomination. Brown, who represented Ohio in the Senate for three terms until his defeat in 2024, won the Democratic nomination against minimal opposition.

With Brown's victory in the general election, he became the first person to be elected back to the Senate after previously being defeated for re-election since Slade Gorton in 1988.

This was one of eight seats Democrats flipped in a state carried by Donald Trump in the 2024 presidential election.

== Background ==
After voting for Democratic presidential candidate Barack Obama in both 2008 and 2012, Ohio had trended increasingly Republican in subsequent years and has been considered a moderate to strong red state at the federal and state level. Entering the 2026 race, Republicans controlled all statewide offices, held supermajorities in both chambers of the state legislature, and held both Senate seats. Republicans also had a majority of the state's House delegation, with ten seats compared to five for Democrats.

Republican nominee Donald Trump won Ohio in 2016 and 2020 (Note: This year Joe Biden defeated Trump nationally, breaking Ohio's bellwether status in presidential elections. Before Biden, the last president elected without Ohio, John F. Kennedy, won nationally in 1960 while Richard Nixon won Ohio by 7.56 percentage points.) by 8 percentage points, and in 2024 increased his margin to 11 percentage points. (Note: Trump thus became only the third presidential candidate, after Franklin D. Roosevelt and Nixon, to win Ohio three times.) Additionally, Republican JD Vance, who became the Vice President of the United States after Trump was re-elected in 2024, defeated Democrat Tim Ryan in the 2022 U.S. Senate election by slightly over 6 points, while Republican Bernie Moreno defeated then-incumbent Sherrod Brown in the 2024 U.S. Senate election by slightly over 3.5 points.

== Interim appointment ==
According to Ohio law, if a U.S. Senate seat becomes vacant, the governor appoints a replacement who serves until December 15 following the next regularly scheduled statewide election that occurs more than 180 days after the vacancy. A special election to fill the remainder of the term is then held concurrently with that regular state election, which in this case would be the one on November 3, 2026. Governor Mike DeWine chose then-Lieutenant Governor Jon Husted to replace Vance in the Senate.

=== Appointee ===
- Jon Husted, lieutenant governor of Ohio (2019–2025)

=== Considered but not appointed ===
- Matt Dolan, former state senator from the 24th district (2017–2024) and candidate for U.S. Senate in 2022 and 2024
- Frank LaRose, Ohio secretary of state (2019–present) and candidate for U.S. Senate in 2024
- Vivek Ramaswamy, former CEO of Roivant Sciences (2014–2023) and candidate for president in 2024
- Jane Timken, former chair of the Ohio Republican Party (2017–2021) and candidate for U.S. Senate in 2022

=== Declined to be considered ===
- Mike DeWine, governor of Ohio (2019–present) and former U.S. senator (1995–2007)
- Dave Yost, Ohio attorney general (2019–2026) (ran for governor, later withdrew)

== Republican primary ==
=== Candidates ===
==== Nominee ====
- Jon Husted, incumbent U.S. senator (2025–present)

=== Endorsements ===
Jon Husted

Executive branch officials

- Donald Trump, president of the United States (2017–2021, 2025–present)

U.S. senators

- Cynthia Lummis, Wyoming (2021–present)
- Bernie Moreno, Ohio (2025–present)
- Tim Scott, South Carolina (2013–present)

U.S. representatives

- Jim Jordan, OH-04 (2007–present)
- Bob Latta, OH-05 (2007–present)
- David Taylor, OH-02 (2025–present)

Statewide officials

- Keith Faber, auditor of state of Ohio (2019–present)
- Frank LaRose, secretary of state of Ohio (2019–present)
- Robert Sprague, treasurer of Ohio (2019–present)
- Dave Yost, attorney general of Ohio (2019–2026)

State legislators

- Ohio Senate Republican Caucus
- More than half of the Ohio House of Representatives (including Speaker Matt Huffman and members such as Kellie Deeter, Gayle Manning, and D. J. Swearingen)

Local officials

- 75 Ohio county sheriffs
- Hocking County commissioners

Individuals

- Vivek Ramaswamy, founder of Roivant Sciences and 2026 gubernatorial nominee

Labor unions

- Associated Builders and Contractors of Ohio
- Cleveland Building and Construction Trades Council
- Fraternal Order of Police of Ohio
- International Brotherhood of Boilermakers, Local 85, Local 105, and Local 744
- International Union of Operating Engineers Locals 18 & 66
- National Border Patrol Council
- Northwest Ohio Building & Construction Trades Council

Organizations

- AIPAC
- ClearPath Foundation
- National Federation of Independent Business
- Ohio Cattlemen's Association
- Ohio Chamber of Commerce
- Ohio Right to Life

Party chapters

- Columbiana County Republican Party
- Pickaway County Republican Party
- Pike County Republican Party
- Warren County Republican Party

Political parties

- Ohio Republican Party

=== Fundraising ===
Campaign finance reports as of April 18, 2026
Candidate	Raised	Spent	Cash on hand
Jon Husted (R)	$10,257,823	$2,017,868	$8,239,954
Source: Federal Election Commission

=== Results ===
Republican primary
Party	Candidate	Votes	%
Republican	Jon Husted (incumbent)	736,413	100.0
Total votes		736,413	100.0

== Democratic primary ==
=== Candidates ===
==== Nominee ====
- Sherrod Brown, former U.S. senator (2007–2025)

==== Eliminated in primary ====
- Ron Kincaid, IT professional and Special Olympics coach

==== Withdrawn ====
- Lynnea Lau, research integrity executive
- Fred Ode, venture capital executive
- Dakota Rose, community activist
- Chris Volpe, tech entrepreneur

==== Declined ====
- Shontel Brown, U.S. representative from Ohio's 11th congressional district (2021–present) (running for re-election)
- Greg Landsman, U.S. representative from Ohio's 1st congressional district (2023–present) (running for re-election)
- Tim Ryan, former U.S. representative from Ohio's 13th congressional district (2003–2023), nominee for U.S. Senate in 2022, and candidate for president in 2020
- Emilia Sykes, U.S. representative from Ohio's 13th congressional district (2023–present) (running for re-election)
- Casey Weinstein, state senator from the 28th district (2025–present)

=== Endorsements ===
Sherrod Brown

Political parties

- Ohio Democratic Party

Labor unions

- Actors' Equity Association
- American Federation of Government Employees
- Central Midwest Regional Council of Carpenters
- Communications Workers of America, District 4
- International Brotherhood of Electrical Workers
- International Federation of Professional and Technical Engineers
- International Union of Bricklayers and Allied Craftworkers, Local 23
- International Union of Painters and Allied Trades (Note: IUPAT International issued the endorsement with the support of IUPAT District Council 6 and IUPAT District Council 53.)
- Ohio AFL-CIO
- Ohio Federation of Teachers
- Ohio State Association of Plumbers and Pipefitters
- Retail, Wholesale and Department Store Union, Local 390
- United Association
- United Auto Workers
- United Food and Commercial Workers, Locals 75, 880, and 1059
- United Steelworkers

Organizations

- End Citizens United
- Giffords
- Human Rights Campaign
- Jewish Democratic Council of America
- Joint Action Committee for Political Affairs
- League of Conservation Voters
- MoveOn
- Planned Parenthood Action Fund
- Population Connection
- Reproductive Freedom for All

=== Fundraising ===
Italics indicate a withdrawn candidate.

Campaign finance reports as of April 18, 2026
Candidate	Raised	Spent	Cash on hand
Sherrod Brown (D)	$24,471,408	$7,956,946	$16,514,461
Ron Kincaid (D)	$41,804	$42,980	$0
Chris Volpe (D)	$4,337	$4,168	$168
Fred Ode (D)	$5,001,938	$4,970,194	$31,744
Source: Federal Election Commission

=== Results ===
Results by county Brown: 70–80%; 80–90%; 90–100%

Democratic primary
Party	Candidate	Votes	%
Democratic	Sherrod Brown	712,106	89.4
Democratic	Ron Kincaid	84,405	10.6
Total votes		796,511	100.0

== Libertarian primary ==
Former Libertarian National Committee chair William Redpath ran as a Libertarian. Health care consultant Jeffrey Kanter was disqualified from the Libertarian primary due to a protest by Ohio Libertarian Kristen Wichers, who demonstrated that Kanter submitted hundreds of invalid signatures with his candidate petition.

=== Candidates ===
==== Nominee ====
- Bill Redpath, former Libertarian National Committee chair and nominee for 2022 United States Senate election in Illinois

Disqualified

- Jeffrey Kanter, healthcare consultant

=== Results ===
Libertarian primary
Party	Candidate	Votes	%
Libertarian	Bill Redpath	4,996	100.0
Total votes		4,996	100.0

== Other third-party and independent candidates ==
Greg Levy, a veteran and community organiser, announced his candidacy in October 2025. A member of the Party for Socialism and Liberation (PSL), he ran on a promise of "Ohio for the workers, not the billionaires". He filed with the Federal Election Commission as an independent candidate. Levy was one of two PSL candidates standing in the 2026 U.S. Senate elections, the other being Joe Tache in Massachusetts.

== General election ==
Data centers became a major issue in the campaign, and a poll from Bowling Green State University showed 71% of Ohioans support a temporary ban on new construction of data centers. Brown criticized Husted for his support of data centers in the past. As lieutenant governor from 2019 to 2025, Husted backed millions of dollars in tax breaks for data center construction projects in Ohio. Husted defended data centers, saying they bring new jobs and money to rural areas. Husted described data centers as a "local issue", and Brown said that the approval of data centers should be decided on the local level.

A September 2026 poll conducted by Bowling Green State University found that 25% of likely Ohio voters incorrectly believed Sherrod Brown was the incumbent U.S. senator from the state, despite him having lost re-election in 2024.

At a campaign rally for Husted on October 12, 2026, President Trump drew media attention by commenting on Husted's physique, saying, "I started examining his body, because I didn't know he was a great athlete. And I looked and I watched up and down. I looked at his ass. And then I looked at his hands. Look at his hands. He's got these, like, claws." Trump repeated the remarks at subsequent campaign appearances, later describing Husted's buttocks as "like a pile of muscle."

The election was the subject of widespread election interference by Russia, with a goal of favoring Jon Husted. It was also one of the most expensive elections in 2026. Outside groups spent over $200 million in support of Husted and $97 million in support of Brown.

=== Predictions ===
Source	Ranking	As of
ABC News	Tossup	November 3, 2026
CBS News	Tossup	October 30, 2026
The Cook Political Report	Tossup	November 2, 2026
Decision Desk HQ	Tossup	November 3, 2026
The Economist (Note: The Economist's prediction model uses unconventional terminology. For the purpose of equivalency, their "Very Likely" ratings are formatted as a "Likely" rating while "Likely" ratings are formatted as a "Lean" rating.)	Tossup	November 3, 2026
FiftyPlusOne	Lean D (flip)	November 3, 2026
Fox News	Lean D (flip)	November 1, 2026
Inside Elections	Tilt D (flip)	October 29, 2026
MS NOW	Tossup	October 29, 2026
NBC News	Tossup	November 3, 2026
RealClearPolitics	Tossup	November 2, 2026
Sabato's Crystal Ball	Lean D (flip)	November 2, 2026
Silver Bulletin	Lean D (flip)	November 3, 2026
Split Ticket	Lean D (flip)	November 2, 2026

=== Post-primary endorsements ===
Jon Husted (R)

Executive branch officials

- George W. Bush, former president of the United States (2001–2009)
- JD Vance, vice president of the United States (2025–present)

U.S. senators

- John Cornyn, Texas (2002–present)

Individuals

- Jon Gruden, former NFL coach

Organizations

- Americans for Prosperity Action
- Log Cabin Republicans
- National Right to Life Committee
- Steak 'n Shake
- U.S. Chamber of Commerce
Sherrod Brown (D)

Executive branch officials

- Barack Obama, former president of the United States (2009–2017)

U.S. senators

- Angela Alsobrooks, Maryland (2025–present)

Individuals

- John Legend, singer

Labor unions

- National Education Association
- Ohio Association of Professional Fire Fighters
- Ohio Conference of Teamsters
- Ohio Patrolmen's Benevolent Association
- United Mine Workers of America COMPAC

Organizations

- American Association of University Professors

Newspapers

- Akron Beacon Journal
- The Columbus Dispatch
Declined to endorse

Statewide officials

- John Kasich, former governor of Ohio (2011–2019) (Republican)

=== Fundraising ===
Campaign finance reports as of October 14, 2026
Candidate	Raised	Spent	Cash on hand
Jon Husted (R)	$19,894,786	$15,655,689	$4,239,097
Sherrod Brown (D)	$68,409,200	$63,956,397	$4,452,803
William Redpath (L)	$55,256	$47,000	$8,255
Greg Levy (I)	$132,712	$107,925	$26,916
Source: Federal Election Commission

=== Polling ===
Aggregate polls

Source of poll aggregation	Dates administered	Dates updated	Jon Husted (R)	Sherrod Brown (D)	Other/ Undecided (Note: Calculated by taking the difference of 100% and all other candidates combined.)	Margin
270toWin	October 16 – November 1, 2026	November 3, 2026	46.8%	48.7%	4.5%	Brown +1.9%
Decision Desk HQ	through November 1, 2026	November 3, 2026	46.2%	48.5%	5.3%	Brown +2.3%
FiftyPlusOne	through November 1, 2026	November 3, 2026	45.4%	48.3%	6.3%	Brown +2.9%
RealClearPolitics	October 15 – November 1, 2026	November 2, 2026	45.7%	48.5%	5.8%	Brown +2.8%
Silver Bulletin	through November 1, 2026	November 3, 2026	45.4%	48.4%	6.2%	Brown +3.0%
Average			45.9%	48.5%	5.6%	Brown +2.6%

Poll source	Date(s) administered	Sample size (Note: Key: A – all adults RV – registered voters LV – likely voters V – unclear)	Margin of error	Jon Husted (R)	Sherrod Brown (D)	Other	Undecided
Emerson College (Note: Poll sponsored by Poll Vault, a Substack newsletter authored by Sean Trende.)	October 31 – November 1, 2026	930 (LV)	± 3.2%	48%	46%	6% (Note: Bill Redpath (L) with 4%; Greg Levy (I) with 2%)	—
Trafalgar Group (R)	October 31 – November 1, 2026	1,092 (LV)	± 2.9%	45%	47%	4% (Note: Greg Levy (I) with 3%; Bill Redpath (L) with 1%)	4%
HarrisX	October 30 – November 1, 2026	496 (LV)	± 4.4%	45%	47%	4% (Note: "Another candidate" with 4%)	5%
Research Co.	October 30 – November 1, 2026	450 (LV)	± 4.6%	44%	45%	2% (Note: "Some other candidate" with 2%)	9%
AtlasIntel	October 28 – November 1, 2026	1,801 (LV)	± 2.0%	44%	51%	4% (Note: "Other" with 3%; "Would not vote" with 1%)	1%
Survey 160	October 27 – November 1, 2026	1,122 (LV)	± 5.4%	46% (Note: With voters who lean towards a given candidate)	50%	4%	1%
Survey 160	October 27 – November 1, 2026	1,122 (LV)	± 5.4%	45%	49%	3%	3%
Survey 160	October 27 – November 1, 2026	1,159 (RV)	± 5.4%	45%	50%	4%	2%
Survey 160	October 27 – November 1, 2026	1,159 (RV)	± 5.4%	44%	49%	3%	4%
New York Times/Siena University	October 26 – November 1, 2026	717 (LV)	± 4.4%	44%	49%	0%	7%
Rasmussen Reports (R)	October 27–31, 2026	1,119 (LV)	± 3.0%	46%	46%	5% (Note: William B. Redpath (L) with 3%; Greg Levy (I) with 2%)	3%
ActiVote	October 18–31, 2026	400 (LV)	± 4.9%	50%	50%	—	—
InsiderAdvantage (R)	October 29–30, 2026	1,200 (LV)	± 2.8%	47%	49%	3%	1%
YouGov	October 26–29, 2026	2,090 (LV)	± 2.8%	48%	50%	2% (Note: "Someone else" with 3%)	1%
Suffolk University	October 21–26, 2026	500 (LV)	± 4.4%	44%	47%	5% (Note: Bill Redpath (L) with 2%; Greg Levy (I) with 2%; "Refused" with 2%; "Write-in" with 0%)	4%
Concord Public Opinion Partners (D) (Note: Poll sponsored by Democrats for Education Reform)	October 22–24, 2026	496 (LV)	± 4.5%	42%	46%	8% (Note: "Someone else" with 8%)	4%
RedBox Research (D) (Note: Poll sponsored by A Fight Worth Having, a Democratic-aligned super PAC.)	October 20–23, 2026	2,998 (LV)	± 4.6%	44%	47%	4% (Note: Bill Redpath (L) with 1%; Greg Levy (I) with 1%; "Someone else" with 1%; "Prefer not to answer" with 1%; "Did not vote in this race" with 0%)	4%
Echelon Insights (R) (Note: Poll conducted for NetChoice)	October 16–23, 2026	508 (LV)	± 5.2%	47%	47%	3% (Note: Greg Levy (I) with 2%; Bill Redpath (L) with 1%)	3%
InsiderAdvantage (R)	October 21–22, 2026	1,200 (LV)	± 2.8%	44%	47%	3% (Note: Greg Levy (I) with 2%; Bill Redpath (L) with 1%)	6%
Verasight/VoteHub	October 1–20, 2026	531 (LV)	± 4.2%	44%	48%	2% (Note: Greg Levy (I) with 1%; Bill Redpath (L) with 1%)	6%
Verasight/VoteHub	October 1–20, 2026	531 (LV)	± 4.2%	41%	45%	4% (Note: Greg Levy (I) with 2%; Bill Redpath (L) with 2%)	—
Beacon Research (D)/ Shaw & Co. Research (R) (Note: Poll conducted for Fox News)	October 15–19, 2026	2,005 (RV)	± 2.0%	46%	53%	—	2%
Beacon Research (D)/ Shaw & Co. Research (R)	October 15–19, 2026	1,592 (LV)	± 2.0%	47%	52%	—	2%
Marist University	October 15–18, 2026	— (LV)	± 4.5%	44%	48%	2%	4%
Marist University	October 15–18, 2026	1,176 (RV)	± 3.9%	42%	51%	3%	4%
ActiVote (Note: May or may not be reliable because ActiVote uses a app to conduct the poll.)	September 26 – October 18, 2026	400 (LV)	± 4.9%	50%	50%	—	—
Rasmussen Reports (R)	October 12–14, 2026	901 (LV)	± 3.0%	49%	47%	2% (Note: Levy (I) with 1%; Redpath (L) with 1%)	2%
GS Strategy Group (R)/ New River Strategies (D) (Note: Poll sponsored by The Cook Political Report.)	October 9–13, 2026	959 (LV)	—	43%	49%	7% (Note: Levy (I) with 4%; Redpath (L) with 3%)	1%
Bowling Green State University/YouGov	September 29 – October 9, 2026	1,000 (LV)	± 4.0%	42%	48%	10% (Note: Levy (I) with 5%; Redpath (L) with 3%; "Someone else" with 2%)	—
co/efficient (R)	October 5–6, 2026	925 (LV)	± 3.5%	46% (Note: Top two candidates only)	45%	–	9%
co/efficient (R)	October 5–6, 2026	925 (LV)	± 3.5%	44%	43%	4% (Note: Greg Levy (I) with 3%; William Redpath (L) with 1%)	9%
SSRS (Note: Poll conducted for CNN)	September 29 – October 5, 2026	760 (LV)	± 4.5%	43%	49%	7% (Note: "Neither" with 5%; "Other" with 2%)	1%
New York Times/Siena University	September 22 – October 1, 2026	616 (LV)	± 4.5%	46%	49%	—	5%
YouGov	September 18–30, 2026	3,780 (LV)	± 2.5%	45%	49%	2%	4%
InsiderAdvantage (R)	September 28–29, 2026	1,200 (LV)	± 2.8%	43%	44%	6% (Note: William Redpath (L) with 4%; Greg Levy (I) with 2%)	7%
Big Data Poll (R) (Note: Poll sponsored by the Public Polling Project)	September 26–27, 2026	680 (LV)	± 4.0%	43%	46%	—	—
Big Data Poll (R)	September 26–27, 2026	680 (LV)	± 4.0%	41%	46%	8% (Note: "Someone else" with 8%)	6%
Big Data Poll (R)	September 26–27, 2026	735 (RV)	± 4.0%	41%	45%	—	—
Big Data Poll (R)	September 26–27, 2026	735 (RV)	± 4.0%	40%	44%	8%	8%
Marist University	September 24–27, 2026	1,298 (RV)	± 3.8%	43%	51%	1%	4%
Suffolk University (Note: Poll sponsored by USA Today)	September 23–27, 2026	500 (LV)	± 4.4%	44%	47%	3% (Note: Bill Redpath (L) with 2%; Greg Levy (I) with 1%)	6%
Rasmussen Reports (R)	September 22–23, 2026	1,115 (LV)	± 3.0%	43%	46%	5% (Note: Bill Redpath (L) with 3%; Greg Levy (I) with 2%)	7%
Quantus Insights (R)	September 21–23, 2026	695 (LV)	± 4.2%	47%	47%	4% (Note: Greg Levy (I) with 2%; Bill Redpath (L) with 1%)	2%
Quantus Insights (R)	September 21–23, 2026	695 (LV)	± 4.2%	45%	46%	4% (Note: Greg Levy (I) with 2%; Bill Redpath (L) with 1%)	6%
Trafalgar Group (R)	September 14–16, 2026	1,085 (LV)	± 2.9%	42%	45%	6%	6%
Bowling Green State University/YouGov	September 1–10, 2026	1,000 (LV)	± 4.0%	45%	48%	7% (Note: Greg Levy (I) with 3%; William Redpath (L) and "Someone else" with 2%)	—
InsiderAdvantage (R)	September 8–9, 2026	1,200 (LV)	± 2.8%	42%	47%	3% (Note: "Another candidate" with 3%)	8%
Concord Public Opinion Partners (D) (Note: Poll sponsored by Democrats for Education Reform)	August 29–31, 2026	504 (LV)	± 4.4%	40%	50%	4% (Note: "Someone else" with 4%)	7%
Abacus Data	August 26–28, 2026	306 (LV)	—	46%	52%	3%	—
Abacus Data	August 26–28, 2026	500 (RV)	± 4.4%	43%	53%	5% (Note: "Another candidate" with 5%)	—
Beacon Research (D)/ Shaw & Co. Research (R)	August 6–10, 2026	1,008 (RV)	± 3.0%	45%	53%	—	2%
Tulchin Research (D) (Note: Poll conducted for John Kulewicz, Democratic candidate for Attorney General)	July 29 – August 4, 2026	600 (LV)	± 4.0%	43%	47%	4% (Note: William Redpath (L) and Greg Levy (I) with 2%)	6%
New York Times/Siena University	June 15–28, 2026	601 (LV)	± 4.7%	50%	47%	—	3%
Fabrizio Ward (R)/ Impact Research (D) (Note: Poll conducted for AARP)	June 14–16, 2026	800 (LV)	± 3.5%	45%	48%	1% (Note: "Someone else" with 1%)	7%
Tulchin Research (D)	June 2–4, 2026	600 (LV)	± 4.0%	42%	46%	4% (Note: William Redpath (L) with 4%)	7%
Beacon Research (D)/ Shaw & Co. Research (R)	May 28 – June 1, 2026	1,015 (RV)	± 3.0%	45%	53%	—	2%
	May 5, 2026	Primary elections are held					
Bowling Green State University/YouGov	April 7–14, 2026	1,000 (RV)	± 4.5%	50%	47%	3%	—
Echelon Insights (R) (Note: Poll commissioned by NetChoice)	April 3–9, 2026	413 (LV)	± 5.8%	51%	45%	—	4%
Quantus Insights (R)	March 13–14, 2026	784 (LV)	± 3.8%	46%	44%	4% (Note: "Some other candidate" with 4%)	6%
OnMessage Public Strategies (R) (Note: Poll sponsored by the Insurance Watchdog Coalition)	March 3–8, 2026	600 (LV)	± 4.0%	45%	47%	—	8%
EMC Research (D) (Note: Polling commissioned by Ohio Environmental Council, an environmental organization)	February 10–22, 2026	1,343 (LV)	± 2.7%	47%	51%	—	2%
Emerson College	December 6–8, 2025	850 (RV)	± 3.3%	49%	46%	—	5%
Bowling Green State University/YouGov	October 2–14, 2025	800 (RV)	± 4.5%	48%	49%	3%	—
Hart Research (D) (Note: Poll sponsored by the Ohio Federation of Teachers, which supports Brown)	September 19–22, 2025	800 (LV)	± 3.5%	45%	48%	—	7%
Emerson College	August 18–19, 2025	1,000 (RV)	± 3%	50%	44%	—	7%
Bowling Green State University/YouGov	April 18–24, 2025	800 (RV)	± 4.1%	49%	46%	5% (Note: "Someone else" with 5%)	—
Bowling Green State University/YouGov	February 14–21, 2025	800 (RV)	± 4.0%	47%	41%	—	12%

Hypothetical polling

Jon Husted vs. Tim Ryan

Poll source	Date(s) administered	Sample size	Margin of error	Jon Husted (R)	Tim Ryan (D)	Other	Undecided
Bowling Green State University/YouGov	April 18–24, 2025	800 (RV)	± 4.1%	50%	44%	6% (Note: "Someone else" with 6%)	—
Bowling Green State University/YouGov	February 14–21, 2025	800 (RV)	± 4.0%	45%	38%	—	17%

== Results ==
2026 United States Senate special election in Ohio
Party	Candidate	Votes	%	±%
Democratic	Sherrod Brown	2,323,001	50.09	+3.18
Republican	Jon Husted (incumbent)	2,090,390	45.07	−7.98
Libertarian	Bill Redpath	129,435	2.79	N/A
Independent	Greg Levy	94,857	2.05	N/A
Write-in				
Total votes		4,637,683	100.0	
Democratic gain from Republican				

Counties that flipped from Republican to Democratic

- Delaware (largest municipality: Delaware)
- Erie (largest municipality: Sandusky)
- Lake (largest municipality: Mentor)
- Mahoning (largest municipality: Youngstown)
- Portage (largest municipality: Kent)
- Trumbull (largest municipality: Warren)
- Wood (largest municipality: Bowling Green)

== Analysis ==
=== Exit poll ===
2026 United States Senate special election in Ohio (CNN)
Demographic subgroup	Brown	Husted	% of total vote
Ideology
Liberals	93	3	24
Moderates	64	29	38
Conservatives	10	86	38
Party
Democrats	96	2	31
Republicans	7	90	39
Independents	57	32	31
Donald Trump job approval
Approve	3	93	41
Disapprove	85	10	57
2024 presidential vote
Kamala Harris	96	1	43
Donald Trump	10	86	49
Another candidate	46	18	2
Did not vote	71	16	4
Gender
Men	45	51	48
Women	54	40	52
Income
$100,000 or more	52	45	37
$50,000-$99,999	46	49	34
Less than $50,000	53	40	29
Race/ethnicity
White	46	50	85
Latino	62	32	2
Black	88	7	8
White born-again or evangelical Christian?
Yes	19	76	27
No	62	33	73
Race by gender
White men	42	55	41
White women	49	45	43
Black men	85	9	3
Black women	91	5	5
All other voters	59	31	8
Age
18–29 years old	69	25	10
30–44 years old	61	32	20
45–64 years old	48	47	35
65 and older	41	56	36
Area type
Urban	70	27	16
Suburban	56	39	45
Rural	35	60	39
Education
College graduate	59	37	42
No college degree	44	51	58
Education by race
White college graduates	56	40	36
Non-white college graduates	77	16	6
Whites without college	38	57	49
Non-whites without college	73	21	9
Education by gender and race
White women with college degrees	62	35	19
White women without college degrees	38	54	24
White men with college degrees	49	47	17
White men without college degrees	36	60	24
Voters of color	75	19	15
Educational attainment
Advanced degree	65	32	18
Bachelor's degree	55	40	24
Associate's degree	45	49	12
Some college	50	44	20
Never attended college	38	57	24

== See also ==
- 2026 Ohio elections

== Notes ==
Partisan clients
