= 2026 United States House of Representatives elections in Ohio =

- November 3, 2026

All 15 Ohio seats to the United States House of Representatives
	Majority party	Minority party
Party	Democratic	Republican
Last election	5	10
Seats won	8	7
Seat change	▲3	▼3
Popular vote	2,318,450	2,178,153
Percentage	50.95%	47.87%
Swing	▲7.52%	▼8.70%

Democratic hold Democratic gain
Republican hold
Democratic
40–50%
50–60%
60–70%
70–80%
80–90%
Republican
50–60%
60–70%
70–80%
80–90%

The 2026 United States House of Representatives elections in Ohio were held on November 3, 2026, to elect the fifteen U.S. representatives from the state of Ohio, one from each of the state's congressional districts. The elections coincided with other elections to the House of Representatives, a special election to the United States Senate, and various state and local elections. The primary elections took place on May 5, 2026.

This marked the first time since 2008 that Democrats won the popular vote and majority of seats in Ohio's U.S. House races.

== Redistricting ==
Map of Ohio's congressional districts as passed by the Ohio Redistricting Commission on October 31, 2025. This will be used for the 2026 House elections. Interactive map version

Due to constitutional requirements, Ohio needed to redraw its congressional map in time for the 2026 election, as the current map was only valid for two cycles. Republicans initially planned for a map that would have resulted in a 13 Republican to two Democrat representation in the state, netting the party three seats. In October 2025, Republicans and Democrats on the state's redistricting commission reached a deal that resulted in a map that made Ohio's 1st and 9th congressional district more Republican-friendly. Democrats protected the Akron-area 13th congressional district, which was redrawn to be slightly more friendly towards Democrats. The redrawn maps were expected to increase Republican chances to flip OH-1 and OH-9, which Republican nominee Donald Trump would have won in the 2024 presidential election by three and eleven points, respectively, however Democrats still won them both in the 2026 elections.

== Statewide polling ==
=== Statewide congressional polls ===
Poll source	Date(s) administered	Sample size (Note: Key: A – all adults RV – registered voters LV – likely voters V – unclear)	Margin of error	Democratic	Republican	Other	Undecided
Marist University	October 15–18, 2026	(LV)	± 4.5%	49%	47%	1% (Note: "Another party's candidate" with 1%; "No response" with >1%)	3%
Marist University	October 15–18, 2026	1,176 (RV)	± 3.9%	51%	46%	2% (Note: "Another party's candidate" with 1%; "No response" with 1%)	1%
Marist University	September 24–27, 2026	1,298 (RV)	± 3.8%	50%	47%	1% (Note: "Another party's candidate" with 1%; "No response" with >1%)	2%

== District 1 ==
2026 Ohio's 1st congressional district election
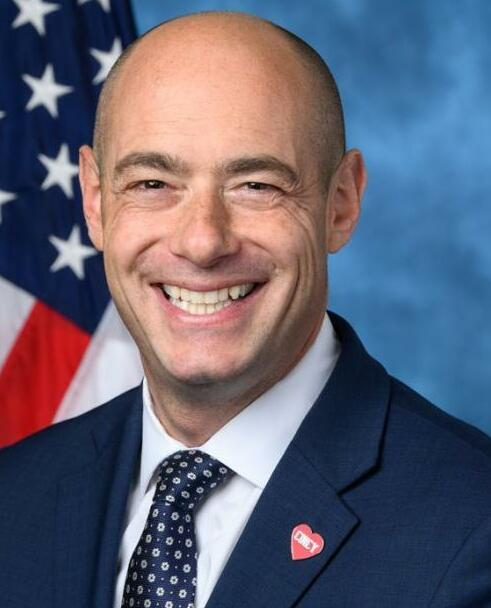

Nominee	Greg Landsman	Eric Conroy
Party	Democratic	Republican
Popular vote	176,453	139,343
Percentage	54.4%	42.9%
U.S. Representative before election
Greg Landsman
Democratic
Elected U.S. Representative
Greg Landsman
Democratic

Ohio's 1st congressional district boundary from the 2026 elections Interactive map version

The 1st district is based in the city of Cincinnati, stretching northward to Warren County and Clinton County after successful redistricting efforts. The incumbent is Democrat Greg Landsman, who was re-elected with 54.6% of the vote in 2024.

=== Democratic primary ===
==== Nominee ====
- Greg Landsman, incumbent U.S. representative

==== Eliminated in primary ====
- Damon Lynch IV, activist

==== Endorsements ====
Greg Landsman

Labor unions

- American Federation of Government Employees

Organizations

- AIPAC
- Democratic Majority for Israel
- End Citizens United
- Joint Action Committee for Political Affairs
- Planned Parenthood Action Fund
- Reproductive Freedom for All
Damon Lynch IV

Organizations

- Track AIPAC

==== Fundraising ====
Campaign finance reports as of December 31, 2025
Candidate	Raised	Spent	Cash on hand
Greg Landsman (D)	$1,828,892	$511,063	$1,497,943
Source: Federal Election Commission

==== Results ====
Democratic primary results
Party	Candidate	Votes	%
Democratic	Greg Landsman (incumbent)	36,984	67.9
Democratic	Damon Lynch IV	17,483	32.1
Total votes		54,467	100.0

=== Republican primary ===
==== Nominee ====
- Eric Conroy, U.S. Air Force veteran and former CIA officer

==== Eliminated in primary ====
- Holly Adams, sales person
- Rosemary Oglesby-Henry, nonprofit CEO

==== Withdrawn ====
- Steven Erbeck, dentist (remained on ballot)

==== Endorsements ====
Eric Conroy

Executive branch officials

- Donald Trump, president of the United States (2017–2021, 2025–present)
- JD Vance, vice president of the United States (2025–present)

U.S. senators

- Jon Husted, Ohio (2025–present)
- Cynthia Lummis, Wyoming (2021–present)
- Bernie Moreno, Ohio (2025–present)

U.S. representatives

- Steve Chabot, former OH-01 (1995–2009, 2011–2023)
- Warren Davidson, OH-08 (2016–present)
- Tom Emmer, House majority whip (2023–present) from MN-06 (2015–present)
- Richard Hudson, NC-09 (2013–present)
- Mike Johnson, speaker of the House (2023–present) from LA-04 (2017–present)
- Jim Jordan, OH-04 (2007–present)
- Lisa McClain, MI-09 (2021–present)
- Steve Scalise, House majority leader (2023–present) from LA-01 (2008–present)
- David Taylor, OH-02 (2025–present)

Organizations

- NRCC MAGA Majority

==== Fundraising ====
Campaign finance reports as of March 31, 2026
Candidate	Raised	Spent	Cash on hand
Holly Adams (R)	$408,835	$221,450	$187,385
Eric Conroy (R)	$823,988	$450,011	$373,977
Steven Erbeck (R)	$619,144	$439,509	$179,635
Rosemary Oglesby-Henry (R)	$44,065	$42,350	$1,715
Source: Federal Election Commission

==== Results ====
Republican primary results
Party	Candidate	Votes	%
Republican	Eric Conroy	25,603	71.9
Republican	Holly Adams	7,020	19.7
Republican	Rosemary Oglesby-Henry	2,994	8.4
Total votes		35,617	100.0

=== Libertarian primary ===
==== Replacement nominee ====
- Nathan Weise, software engineer

==== Withdrew after nomination ====
- John Hancock, engineering technician

==== Eliminated in primary ====
- Jason Stoops, property owner (write-in)

==== Fundraising ====
Campaign finance reports as of December 31, 2025
Candidate	Raised	Spent	Cash on hand
John Hancock (L)	$1,316	$0	$1,316
Source: Federal Election Commission

==== Results ====
Libertarian primary results
Party	Candidate	Votes	%
Libertarian	John Hancock	535	91.3
Libertarian	Jason Stoops (write-in)	51	8.7
Total votes		586	100.0

=== General election ===
==== Predictions ====
Source	Ranking	As of
Decision Desk HQ	Likely D	September 25, 2026
The Cook Political Report	Likely D	October 16, 2026
Inside Elections	Lean D	October 29, 2026
Silver Bulletin	Likely D	November 3, 2026
Sabato's Crystal Ball	Likely D	October 20, 2026

==== Post-primary endorsements ====
Greg Landsman (D)

Executive branch officials

- Pete Buttigieg, former secretary of transportation (2021–2025)

Labor unions

- Ohio AFL-CIO
- Ohio Conference of Teamsters

Organizations

- Giffords
- Jewish Democratic Council of America
- League of Conservation Voters

==== Fundraising ====
Campaign finance reports as of October 14, 2026
Candidate	Raised	Spent	Cash on hand
Greg Landsman (D)	$5,662,206	$5,339,370	$502,952
Eric Conroy (R)	$2,372,637	$2,079,240	$293,397
Nathan Weise (L)	$0	$0	$0
Source: Federal Election Commission

==== Polling ====
Poll source	Date(s) administered	Sample size	Margin of error	Greg Landsman (D)	Eric Conroy (R)	Other	Undecided
RedBox Research (D) (Note: Poll sponsored by A Fight Worth Having)	October 20-23, 2026	821 (LV)	± 4.3%	48%	39%	8% (Note: Nathan Weise (L) with 3%; "Prefer not to answer" with 2%; "Someone else" with 2%; "Did not vote in this race" with 1%)	5%
Quantus Insights	October 19–21, 2026	561 (LV)	± 4.4%	47%	42%	7% (Note: "Would not vote in this race" with 4%; "Someone else" with 2%; Nathan Weise (L) with 1%)	5%
Quantus Insights	October 19–21, 2026	561 (LV)	± 4.4%	47% (Note: With voters who lean towards a given candidate)	44%	7% (Note: "Would not vote in this race" with 4%; "Someone else" with 2%; Nathan Weise (L) with 1%)	2%
Torchlight Strategies (R) (Note: Poll sponsored by Conroy's campaign)	September 29 – October 2, 2026	400 (LV)	± 4.8%	46%	44%	5% (Note: Nathan Weise with 5%)	5%
Quantus Insights	August 21–24, 2026	509 (LV)	± 4.6%	47%	43%	1% (Note: "Someone else" with 1%)	9%
Quantus Insights	August 21–24, 2026	509 (LV)	± 4.6%	48%	45%	2% (Note: "Someone else" with 2%)	5%

Hypothetical polling

Generic Democrat vs. generic Republican

Poll source	Date(s) administered	Sample size	Margin of error	Generic Democrat	Generic Republican	Undecided
Torchlight Strategies	September 29 – October 2, 2026	400 (LV)	± 4.8%	45%	45%	10%

==== Results ====
2026 Ohio's 1st congressional district election
Party	Candidate	Votes	%
Democratic	Greg Landsman (incumbent)	176,453	54.4%
Republican	Eric Conroy	139,343	42.9%
Libertarian	Nathan Weise	8,675	2.7%
Total votes		324,471	100%
Democratic hold			

== District 2 ==
2026 Ohio's 2nd congressional district election
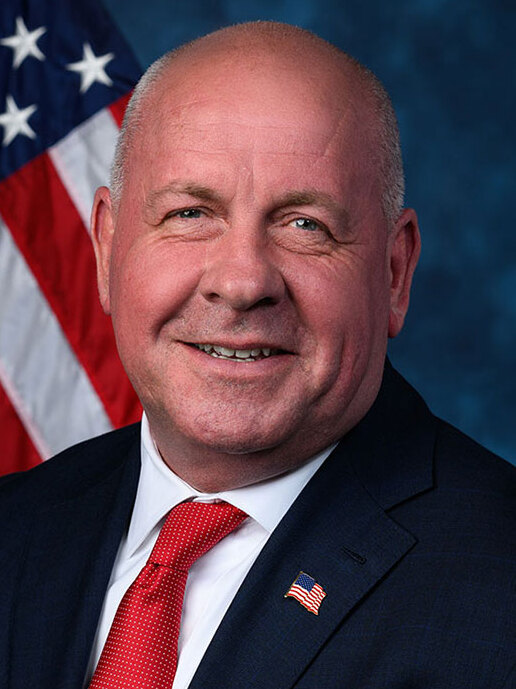

Nominee	David Taylor	Jennifer Mazzuckelli
Party	Republican	Democratic
Popular vote	175,411	97,638
Percentage	64.2%	35.8%
U.S. Representative before election
David Taylor
Republican
Elected U.S. Representative
David Taylor
Republican

Ohio's 2nd congressional district boundary from the 2026 elections Interactive map version

The new 2nd district takes in the eastern Cincinnati suburbs, including Amelia, and stretches eastward along the Ohio River, taking in Athens and Marietta. The incumbent is Republican David Taylor, who was elected with 73.50% of the vote in 2024.

=== Republican primary ===
==== Nominee ====
- David Taylor, incumbent U.S. representative

==== Eliminated in primary ====
- Bob Carr

==== Endorsements ====
David Taylor

Executive branch officials

- Donald Trump, 45th and 47th president of the United States (2017–2021, 2025–present)

Organizations

- Ohio Right to Life

==== Fundraising ====
Campaign finance reports as of December 31, 2025
Candidate	Raised	Spent	Cash on hand
David Taylor (R)	$639,826	$357,430	$410,203
Source: Federal Election Commission

==== Results ====
Republican primary results
Party	Candidate	Votes	%
Republican	David Taylor (incumbent)	51,885	75.0
Republican	Bob Carr	17,321	25.0
Total votes		69,206	100.0

=== Democratic primary ===
==== Nominee ====
- Jennifer Mazzuckelli, homemaker and candidate for Clermont County commissioner in 2024

==== Eliminated in primary ====
- Todd Wilson, educator and administrator

==== Results ====
Democratic primary results
Party	Candidate	Votes	%
Democratic	Jennifer Mazzuckelli	15,381	53.3
Democratic	Todd Wilson	13,484	46.7
Total votes		28,865	100.0

=== Libertarian primary ===
==== Filed paperwork ====
- Kenneth Jacob Dietz

=== General election ===
==== Predictions ====
Source	Ranking	As of
Decision Desk HQ	Safe R	July 14, 2026
The Cook Political Report	Solid R	November 2, 2025
Inside Elections	Solid R	October 31, 2025
Silver Bulletin	Solid R	November 3, 2026
Sabato's Crystal Ball	Safe R	April 10, 2025

==== Post-primary endorsements ====
Jennifer Mazzuckelli (D)

Labor unions

- Ohio AFL-CIO
David Taylor (R)

Organizations

- U.S. Chamber of Commerce

==== Fundraising ====
Campaign finance reports as of June 30, 2026
Candidate	Raised	Spent	Cash on hand
David Taylor (R)	$1,095,247	$780,078	$442,977
Jennifer Mazzuckelli (D)	$1,065	$845	$219
Source: Federal Election Commission

==== Results ====
2026 Ohio's 2nd congressional district election
Party	Candidate	Votes	%
Republican	David Taylor (incumbent)	175,411	64.2%
Democratic	Jennifer Mazzuckelli	97,638	35.8%
Total votes		273,049	100%
Republican hold			

== District 3 ==
2026 Ohio's 3rd congressional district election
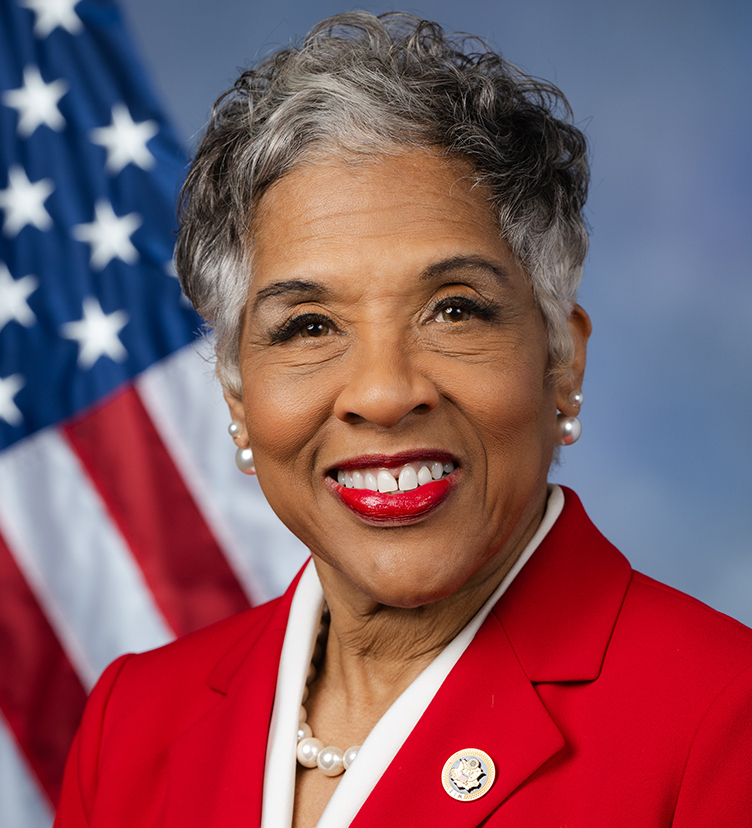

Nominee	Joyce Beatty	Cleophus Dulaney
Party	Democratic	Republican
Popular vote	231,925	68,407
Percentage	77.2%	22.8%
U.S. Representative before election
Joyce Beatty
Democratic
Elected U.S. Representative
Joyce Beatty
Democratic

Ohio's 3rd congressional district boundary from the 2026 elections Interactive map version

The 3rd district is located entirely within the borders of Franklin County, taking in inner Columbus, Bexley, and Whitehall, as well as Franklin County's share of Reynoldsburg. The incumbent is Democrat Joyce Beatty, who was re-elected with 70.70% of the vote in 2024.

=== Democratic primary ===
==== Nominee ====
- Joyce Beatty, incumbent U.S. representative

==== Eliminated in primary ====
- Joe Gerard, engineer

==== Endorsements ====
Joyce Beatty

Labor unions

- American Federation of Government Employees

Organizations

- AIPAC
- Democratic Majority for Israel
- National Women's Political Caucus
- Planned Parenthood Action Fund

==== Fundraising ====
Campaign finance reports as of December 31, 2025
Candidate	Raised	Spent	Cash on hand
Joyce Beatty (D)	$702,305	$695,492	$2,719,386
Source: Federal Election Commission

==== Results ====
Democratic primary results
Party	Candidate	Votes	%
Democratic	Joyce Beatty (incumbent)	62,851	79.3
Democratic	Joe Gerard	16,381	20.7
Total votes		79,232	100.0

=== Republican primary ===
==== Nominee ====
- Cleophus Dulaney, candidate for this district in 2020

==== Results ====
Republican primary results
Party	Candidate	Votes	%
Republican	Cleophus Dulaney	15,779	100.0
Total votes		15,779	100.0

=== Independents ===
==== Filed paperwork ====
- Michelle Bird

=== General election ===
==== Post-primary endorsements ====
Joyce Beatty (D)

Labor unions

- Ohio AFL-CIO
- Ohio Conference of Teamsters

Organizations

- Elect Democratic Women

==== Predictions ====
Source	Ranking	As of
Decision Desk HQ	Safe D	July 14, 2026
The Cook Political Report	Solid D	November 2, 2025
Inside Elections	Solid D	October 31, 2025
Silver Bulletin	Solid D	November 3, 2026
Sabato's Crystal Ball	Safe D	April 10, 2025

==== Fundraising ====
Campaign finance reports as of June 30, 2026
Candidate	Raised	Spent	Cash on hand
Joyce Beatty (D)	$1,201,451	$1,137,203	$2,776,821
Cleophus Dulaney (R)	$0	$0	$0
Source: Federal Election Commission

==== Results ====
2026 Ohio's 3rd congressional district election
Party	Candidate	Votes	%
Democratic	Joyce Beatty (incumbent)	231,925	77.2%
Republican	Cleophus Dulaney	68,407	22.8%
Total votes		300,332	100%
Democratic hold			

== District 4 ==
2026 Ohio's 4th congressional district election
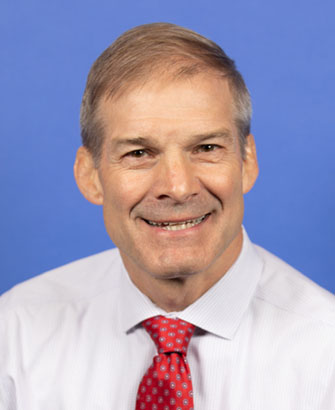

Nominee	Jim Jordan	Joshua Kolasinski
Party	Republican	Democratic
Popular vote	197,084	95,497
Percentage	64.5%	31.3%
U.S. Representative before election
Jim Jordan
Republican
Elected U.S. Representative
Jim Jordan
Republican

Ohio's 4th congressional district boundary from the 2026 elections Interactive map version

The 4th district sprawls from the Columbus exurbs, including Marion and Lima into north-central Ohio, taking in Mansfield. The incumbent is Republican Jim Jordan, who was re-elected with 68.5% of the vote in 2024.

=== Republican primary ===
==== Nominee ====
- Jim Jordan, incumbent U.S. representative

==== Endorsements ====
Jim Jordan

Executive branch officials

- Donald Trump, 45th and 47th president of the United States (2017–2021, 2025–present)

Organizations

- Freedom Caucus Fund

==== Fundraising ====
Campaign finance reports as of December 31, 2025
Candidate	Raised	Spent	Cash on hand
Jim Jordan (R)	$2,662,420	$3,589,503	$6,559,797
Source: Federal Election Commission

==== Results ====
Republican primary results
Party	Candidate	Votes	%
Republican	Jim Jordan (incumbent)	75,210	100.0
Total votes		75,210	100.0

=== Democratic primary ===
==== Nominee ====
- Joshua Kolasinski, small business owner

==== Results ====
Democratic primary results
Party	Candidate	Votes	%
Democratic	Joshua Kolasinski	26,406	100.0
Total votes		26,406	100.0

=== Independents ===
==== Declared ====
- Tracey Tackett, assistant mayor of Springfield

==== Not on ballot ====
- Tamie Wilson, businesswoman and Democratic nominee for this district in 2022 and 2024

=== General election ===
==== Predictions ====
Source	Ranking	As of
Decision Desk HQ	Safe R	July 14, 2026
The Cook Political Report	Solid R	November 2, 2025
Inside Elections	Solid R	October 31, 2025
Silver Bulletin	Solid R	November 3, 2026
Sabato's Crystal Ball	Safe R	April 10, 2025

==== Post-primary endorsements ====
Jim Jordan (R)

Organizations

- U.S. Chamber of Commerce
Tracey Tackett (I)

State legislators

- Rhine McLin, former Mayor of Dayton (2002–2010), former member of the Ohio Senate (1995–2001) and former member of the Ohio House of Representatives (1989–1994) (Democrat)
- David Hartley, former member of the Ohio House of Representatives (1973–1998)

Political parties

- Forward Party

Labor unions

- United Auto Workers Ohio Region 2B

==== Fundraising ====
Italics indicate a disqualified candidate

Campaign finance reports as of June 30, 2026
Candidate	Raised	Spent	Cash on hand
Jim Jordan (R)	$4,774,322	$6,230,901	$6,030,300
Joshua Kolasinski (D)	$12,868	$12,403	$464
Tamie Wilson (I)	$22,050	$0	$520,820
Source: Federal Election Commission

==== Results ====
2026 Ohio's 4th congressional district election
Party	Candidate	Votes	%
Republican	Jim Jordan (incumbent)	197,084	64.49%
Democratic	Joshua Kolasinski	95,497	31.25%
Independent	Tracey Tackett	13,005	4.26%
Total votes		305,586	100.0%
Republican hold			

== District 5 ==
2026 Ohio's 5th congressional district election
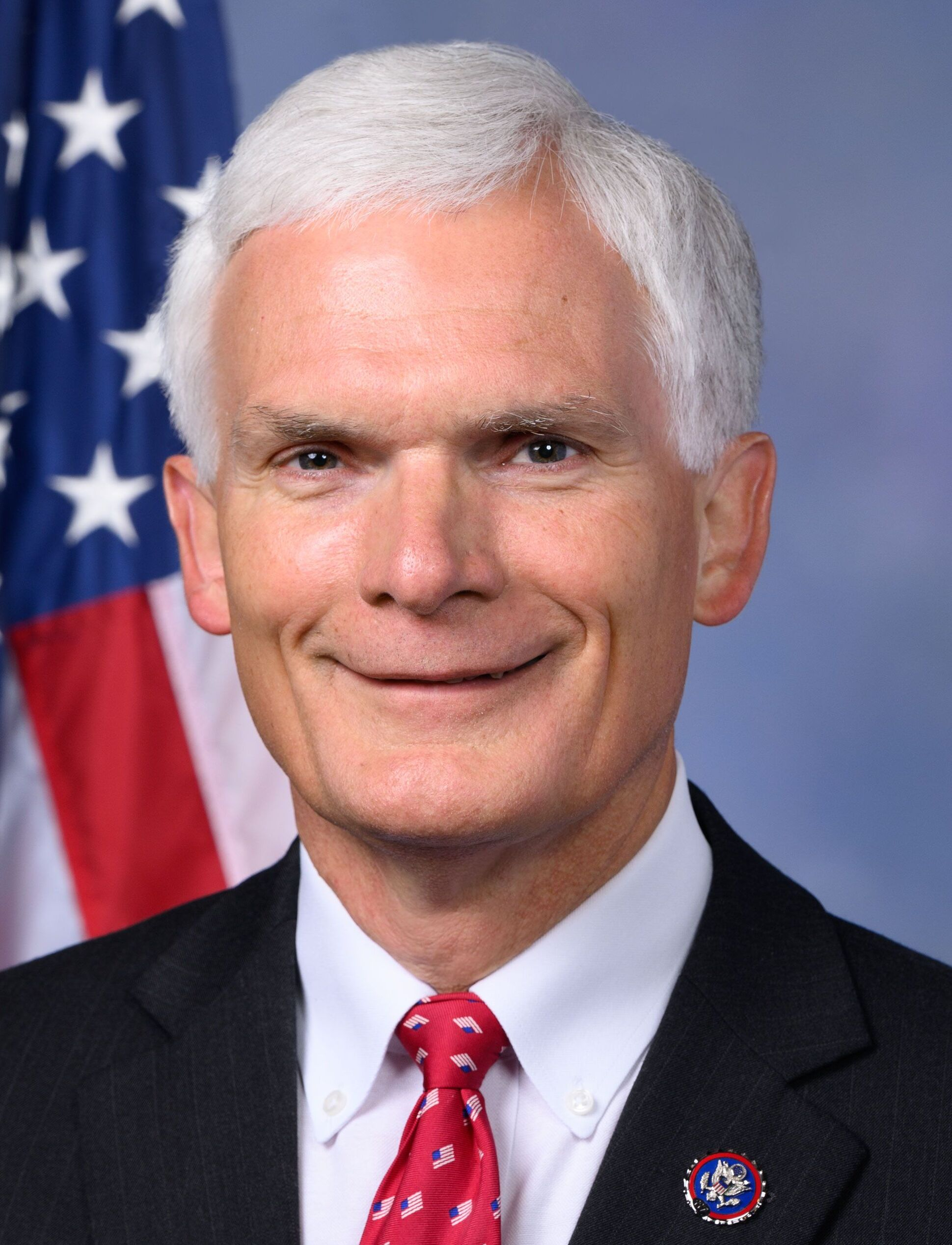

Nominee	Bob Latta	Brian Shaver
Party	Republican	Democratic
Popular vote	163,382	128,142
Percentage	54.3%	42.6%
U.S. Representative before election
Bob Latta
Republican
Elected U.S. Representative
Bob Latta
Republican

Ohio's 5th congressional district boundary from the 2026 elections Interactive map version

The 5th district encompasses the lower portion of Northwestern Ohio and the middle shore of Lake Erie, taking in Findlay, Lorain, Oberlin, and Bowling Green. The incumbent is Republican Bob Latta, who was re-elected with 67.50% of the vote in 2024.

=== Republican primary ===
==== Nominee ====
- Bob Latta, incumbent U.S. representative

==== Endorsements ====
Bob Latta

Executive branch officials

- Donald Trump, 45th and 47th president of the United States (2017–2021, 2025–present)

==== Fundraising ====
Campaign finance reports as of December 31, 2025
Candidate	Raised	Spent	Cash on hand
Bob Latta (R)	$950,120	$524,489	$1,022,426
Source: Federal Election Commission

==== Results ====
Republican primary results
Party	Candidate	Votes	%
Republican	Bob Latta (incumbent)	58,056	100.0
Total votes		58,056	100.0

=== Democratic primary ===
==== Nominee ====
- Brian Shaver, president of Fostoria City Council

==== Eliminated in primary ====
- Daniel Burket, small business owner
- Martin Heberling III, educator and candidate for this district in 2022
- Scott Tabor, sheet metal worker

==== Fundraising ====
Campaign finance reports as of December 31, 2025
Candidate	Raised	Spent	Cash on hand
Daniel Burket (D)	$664	$23	$640
Source: Federal Election Commission

==== Results ====
Democratic primary results
Party	Candidate	Votes	%
Democratic	Brian Shaver	11,914	28.7
Democratic	Martin Heberling III	10,706	25.8
Democratic	Daniel Burket	10,145	24.4
Democratic	Scott Tabor	8,759	21.1
Total votes		41,524	100.0

=== Libertarian primary ===
==== Nominee ====
- Michael J. Veloff (write-in)

==== Endorsements ====
Michael J. Veloff

Political parties

- United States Pirate Party

==== Results ====
Libertarian primary results
Party	Candidate	Votes	%
Libertarian	Michael J. Veloff (write-in)	25	100.0
Total votes		25	100.0

=== Independents ===
==== Filed paperwork ====
- Dalton Franklin

=== General election ===
==== Predictions ====
Source	Ranking	As of
Decision Desk HQ	Safe R	July 14, 2026
The Cook Political Report	Solid R	November 2, 2025
Inside Elections	Solid R	October 31, 2025
Silver Bulletin	Solid R	November 3, 2026
Sabato's Crystal Ball	Safe R	April 10, 2025

==== Post-primary endorsements ====
Bob Latta (R)

Organizations

- U.S. Chamber of Commerce

==== Fundraising ====
Campaign finance reports as of June 30, 2026
Candidate	Raised	Spent	Cash on hand
Bob Latta (R)	$1,461,647	$1,038,449	$1,019,992
Brian Shaver (D)	$11,664	$7,258	$8,741
Source: Federal Election Commission

==== Results ====
2026 Ohio's 5th congressional district election
Party	Candidate	Votes	%
Republican	Bob Latta (incumbent)	163,382	54.3%
Democratic	Brian Shaver	128,142	42.6%
Libertarian	Michael Veloff	9,577	3.2%
Total votes		301,101	100%
Republican hold			

== District 6 ==
2026 Ohio's 6th congressional district election
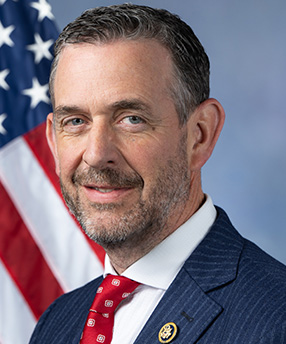

Nominee	Michael Rulli	Elizabeth Kirtley
Party	Republican	Democratic
Popular vote	163,675	107,310
Percentage	60.4%	39.6%
U.S. Representative before election
Michael Rulli
Republican
Elected U.S. Representative
Michael Rulli
Republican

Ohio's 6th congressional district boundary from the 2026 elections Interactive map version

The 6th district encompasses parts of Appalachian Ohio and the Mahoning Valley, including Youngstown, Steubenville, and Massillon. The incumbent is Republican Michael Rulli, who was re-elected with 66.7% of the vote in 2024.

=== Republican primary ===
==== Nominee ====
- Michael Rulli, incumbent U.S. representative

==== Eliminated in primary ====
- Jullie Kelley, pastor and town board candidate in 2023

==== Endorsements ====
Michael Rulli

Executive branch officials

- Donald Trump, 45th and 47th president of the United States (2017–2021, 2025–present)

==== Fundraising ====
Campaign finance reports as of December 31, 2025
Candidate	Raised	Spent	Cash on hand
Michael Rulli (R)	$726,044	$486,871	$309,810
Source: Federal Election Commission

==== Results ====
Republican primary results
Party	Candidate	Votes	%
Republican	Michael Rulli (incumbent)	47,868	76.2
Republican	Jullie Kelley	14,945	23.8
Total votes		62,813	100.0

=== Democratic primary ===
==== Nominee ====
- Elizabeth Kirtley, freelance writer

==== Eliminated in primary ====
- Sean Connolly, tattoo shop owner
- Charles DiPalma, nominee for Ohio's 96th House of Representatives district in 2022
- Brent Hanni, fiscal officer for the Mahoning County clerk of courts
- Christopher Lafont, manager (write-in)
- Malcolm Ritchie, retired locomotive engineer
- Adrian Vitus, public policy specialist

==== Withdrawn ====
- Michael Kripchak, businessman and nominee for this district in 2024 (running for state senate)

==== Endorsements ====
Adrian Vitus

Executive branch officials

- Ted Strickland, former governor of Ohio (2007–2011)

U.S. representatives

- Tim Ryan, OH-13 (2013–2023) and nominee for U.S. Senate in 2022

Political parties

- Working Families Party
Malcolm Ritchie

Political action committees

- Center for Freethought Equality PAC
Sean Connolly

Political organizations

- Mahoning Valley Democratic Socialists of America

==== Fundraising ====
Italics indicate a withdrawn candidate.

Campaign finance reports as of December 31, 2025
Candidate	Raised	Spent	Cash on hand
Michael Kripchak (D)	$1,700	$4,854	$2,840
Malcolm Ritchie (D)	$8,669	$7,835	$834
Source: Federal Election Commission

==== Results ====
Democratic primary results
Party	Candidate	Votes	%
Democratic	Elizabeth Kirtley	12,318	31.5
Democratic	Adrian Vitus	8,602	22.0
Democratic	Sean Connolly	8,053	20.6
Democratic	Brent Hanni	3,765	9.6
Democratic	Malcolm Ritchie	3,520	9.0
Democratic	Charles DiPalma	2,797	7.2
Democratic	Christopher Lafont (write-in)	12	0.03
Total votes		39,067	100.0

=== General election ===
==== Post-primary endorsements ====
Michael Rulli (R)

Labor unions

- Ohio Conference of Teamsters

Organizations

- U.S. Chamber of Commerce

==== Predictions ====
Source	Ranking	As of
Decision Desk HQ	Safe R	July 14, 2026
The Cook Political Report	Solid R	November 2, 2025
Inside Elections	Solid R	October 31, 2025
Silver Bulletin	Solid R	November 3, 2026
Sabato's Crystal Ball	Safe R	April 10, 2025

==== Fundraising ====
Campaign finance reports as of September 30, 2026
Candidate	Raised	Spent	Cash on hand
Michael Rulli (R)	$1,403,352	$1,012,512	$461,477
Elizabeth Kirtley (D)	$11,431	$7,058	$4,373
Source: Federal Election Commission

==== Results ====
2026 Ohio's 6th congressional district election
Party	Candidate	Votes	%
Republican	Michael Rulli (incumbent)	163,675	60.4%
Democratic	Elizabeth Kirtley	107,310	39.6%
Total votes		270,985	100%
Republican hold			

== District 7 ==
2026 Ohio's 7th congressional district election

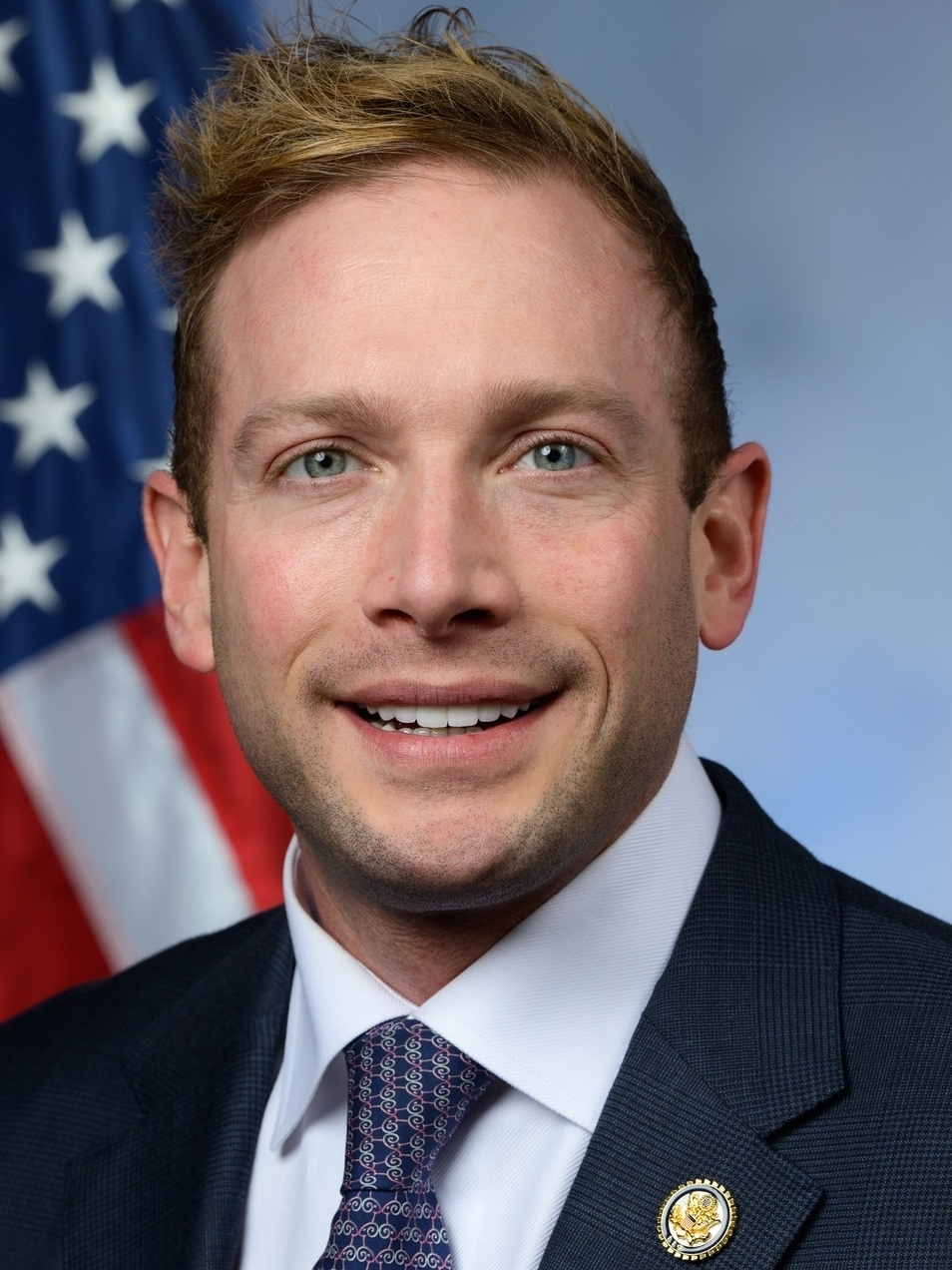
Nominee	Brian Poindexter	Max Miller
Party	Democratic	Republican
Popular vote	180,614	148,177
Percentage	54.9%	45.1%
U.S. Representative before election
Max Miller
Republican
Elected U.S. Representative
Brian Poindexter
Democratic

Ohio's 7th congressional district boundary from the 2026 elections Interactive map version

The 7th district stretches from exurban Cleveland to rural areas in north central Ohio, including Medina, Ashland, and Wooster. The incumbent is Republican Max Miller, who was re-elected with 51.10% of the vote in 2024.

=== Republican primary ===
==== Nominee ====
- Max Miller, incumbent U.S. representative (2023–present)

==== Withdrawn ====
- Jonah Schulz, author

==== Endorsements ====
Max Miller

Executive branch officials

- Donald Trump, president of the United States (2017–2021, 2025–present)

Organizations

- Log Cabin Republicans
- Republican Jewish Coalition

==== Fundraising ====
Italics indicate a withdrawn candidate.

Campaign finance reports as of June 30, 2026
Candidate	Raised	Spent	Cash on hand
Max Miller (R)	$2,142,561	$937,959	$1,379,131
Jonah Schulz (R)	$15,510	$15,510	$0
Source: Federal Election Commission

==== Results ====
Republican primary results
Party	Candidate	Votes	%
Republican	Max Miller (incumbent)	50,345	100.0
Total votes		50,345	100.0

=== Democratic primary ===
==== Nominee ====
- Brian Poindexter, ironworker and Brook Park city councilman

==== Eliminated in primary ====
- John Butchko, retired United Methodist Church pastor
- Ann Marie Donegan, former mayor of Olmsted Falls
- Michael Eisner, attorney
- Ed FitzGerald, former Cuyahoga County executive (2011–2015) and nominee for governor in 2014
- Keith Mundy, nominee for the 5th district in 2024, and the 16th district in 2016
- Laura Rodriguez-Carbone, community advocate
- Scott Schulz, Bay Village Board of Education member

==== Endorsements ====
Michael Eisner

Organizations

- Vote Common Good

Newspapers

- The Plain Dealer
Brian Poindexter

U.S. senators

- Bernie Sanders, Vermont (2007–present) (Independent)

U.S. representatives

- Greg Casar, TX-35 (2023–present)
- Chris Deluzio, PA-17 (2023–present)
- Maxwell Frost, FL-10 (2023–present)
- Val Hoyle, OR-04 (2023–present)
- Pramila Jayapal, WA-07 (2017–present)
- Ro Khanna, CA-17 (2017–present)
- Tim Ryan, former OH-13 (2013–2023)

State legislators

- Nickie Antonio, minority leader of the Ohio Senate (2023–present) from the 23rd district (2019–present)
- Sean Brennan, state representative from the 14th district (2023-present)

Labor unions

- American Federation of Government Employees
- North Shore AFL-CIO
- United Auto Workers

Organizations

- Congressional Progressive Caucus
- End Citizens United
- Our Revolution

Political parties

- Working Families Party
Laura Rodriguez-Carbone

Organizations

- Center for Freethought Equality PAC

==== Fundraising ====
Campaign finance reports as of June 30, 2026
Candidate	Raised	Spent	Cash on hand
Brian Poindexter (D)	$603,155	$290,865	$312,290
Michael Eisner (D)	$69,930	$69,930	$0
Ed FitzGerald (D)	$281,271	$295,882	$0
Scott Schulz (D)	$30,866	$31,735	$0
Source: Federal Election Commission

==== Results ====
Democratic primary results
Party	Candidate	Votes	%
Democratic	Brian Poindexter	23,167	37.0
Democratic	Ed FitzGerald	13,505	21.6
Democratic	Laura Rodriguez-Carbone	7,719	12.3
Democratic	Michael Eisner	7,361	11.8
Democratic	Ann Marie Donegan	6,562	10.5
Democratic	Scott Schulz	2,698	4.3
Democratic	John Butchko	907	1.5
Democratic	Keith Mundy	697	1.1
Total votes		62,616	100.0

=== Libertarian primary ===
==== Eliminated in primary ====
- Brian Duvall-Gambino, motivational speaker and life coach (write-in)

==== Results ====
Libertarian primary results
Party	Candidate	Votes	%
Libertarian	Brian Duvall-Gambino (write-in)	23	100.0
Total votes		23	100.0

=== Independents ===
==== Write-ins ====
- Thahbia Asad
- Andrey Martinichin, nurse

=== General election ===
==== Campaign ====
In late July 2026, Miller began to face calls from state and national Republicans to drop out of the race following national news reports of abuse allegations by his ex-wife. The allegations, which he denies, include scalding his wife with hot water, holding a gun to her head, pushing her and hitting her head against a wall, and breaking the collarbone and bruising the shoulder of their two-year-old daughter. Following the allegations, Miller sued his ex-wife for defamation. On August 8, 2026 at 4pm EDT, Miller remained in the race. According to Ohio state law, this means the Republican Party can no longer replace him as the candidate on the general election ballot.

==== Predictions ====
Source	Ranking	As of
The Cook Political Report	Tossup	August 10, 2026
Decision Desk HQ	Tossup	July 14, 2026
Inside Elections	Tilt D (flip)	October 29, 2026
Silver Bulletin	Likely D (flip)	November 3, 2026
Sabato's Crystal Ball	Lean D (flip)	November 2, 2026

==== Post-primary endorsements ====
Max Miller (R)

U.S. representatives

- Lisa McClain, MI-09 (2021–present)

Individuals

- Vivek Ramaswamy, founder of Roivant Sciences and 2026 gubernatorial nominee

Labor unions

- International Union of Operating Engineers Local 18
- Ohio Conference of Teamsters
Brian Poindexter (D)

Executive branch officials

- Pete Buttigieg, former secretary of transportation (2021–2025)

U.S. representatives

- Adam Gray, CA-13 (2025–present)
- Pat Ryan, NY-18 (2023–present)
- Dennis Kucinich, OH-10 (1997-2013) (Independent; elected as a Democrat)

Labor unions

- AFSCME
- American Federation of Teachers
- Ohio AFL-CIO
- Ohio Federation of Teachers
- Ohio State Building and Construction Trades Council
- United Steelworkers

Organizations

- Blue Dog PAC
- DCCC Red to Blue
- J Street
- Jewish Democratic Council of America
- Progressive Democrats of America
- Reproductive Freedom for All
Declined to endorse

U.S. senators

- Jim Banks, Indiana (2025–present) (Republican)
- Katie Britt, Alabama (2023–present) (Republican)
- Shelley Moore Capito, West Virginia (2015–present) (Republican)
- Jon Husted, Ohio (2025–present) (Republican)
- Roger Marshall, Kansas (2021–present) (Republican)
- Bernie Moreno, Ohio (2025–present) (Republican)
- Tim Sheehy, Montana (2025–present) (Republican)

U.S. representatives

- Jim Renacci, former OH-16 (2011–2019) (Republican)

Statewide officials

- Mike DeWine, governor of Ohio (2019–present) (Republican)

==== Fundraising ====
Campaign finance reports as of October 14, 2026
Candidate	Raised	Spent	Cash on hand
Max Miller (R)	$3,324,942	$3,363,842	$135,629
Brian Poindexter (D)	$3,720,342	$2,926,666	$793,675
Source: Federal Election Commission

==== Polling ====
Poll source	Date(s) administered	Sample size	Margin of error	Max Miller (R)	Brian Poindexter (D)	Other	Undecided
RedBox Research (D)	October 20-23, 2026	875 (LV)	± 4.1%	42%	46%	6% (Note: "Someone else" with 4%; "Prefer not to answer" with 1%; "Did not vote in this race" with 1%)	6%
Bedrock Polling (D) (Note: Poll sponsored by International Association of Bridge, Structural, Ornamental and Reinforcing Iron Workers which supports Poindexter and The Next 50)	August 7–10, 2026	866 (LV)	± 3.7%	35%	43%	6% (Note: "Someone else" with 6%)	16%
co/efficient (R)	August 5–6, 2026	615 (LV)	± 4.0%	33%	47%	—	20%
Tavern Research (D)	August 4–5, 2026	635 (LV)	± 4.8%	46%	54%	—	—
co/efficient (R)	July 29–30, 2026	— (LV)	± 3.8%	39%	44%	—	16%
	July 28, 2026	Miller abuse allegations reported in national news					
GBAO (D) (Note: Poll sponsored by Poindexter's campaign)	June 16–20, 2026	500 (LV)	± 3.5%	44%	43%	—	13%

Hypothetical polling

Brian Poindexter vs. generic Republican vs. generic Libertarian

Poll source	Date(s) administered	Sample size	Margin of error	Generic Republican	Brian Poindexter	Generic Libertarian	Undecided
Bedrock Polling (D)	August 7–10, 2026	866 (LV)	± 3.7%	44%	39%	1%	15%

Generic Republican vs. generic Democrat vs. generic Libertarian

Poll source	Date(s) administered	Sample size	Margin of error	Generic Republican	Generic Democrat	Generic Libertarian	Undecided
Bedrock Polling (D)	August 7–10, 2026	866 (LV)	± 3.7%	44%	43%	2%	11%

Generic Republican vs. generic Democrat

Poll source	Date(s) administered	Sample size	Margin of error	Generic Republican	Generic Democrat	Undecided
Tavern Research (D)	August 4–5, 2026	635 (LV)	± 4.8%	50%	50%	—

==== Results ====
2026 Ohio's 7th congressional district election
Party	Candidate	Votes	%
Democratic	Brian Poindexter	180,614	54.9%
Republican	Max Miller (incumbent)	148,177	45.1%
Total votes		148,177	100%
Democratic gain from Republican			

== District 8 ==
2026 Ohio's 8th congressional district election
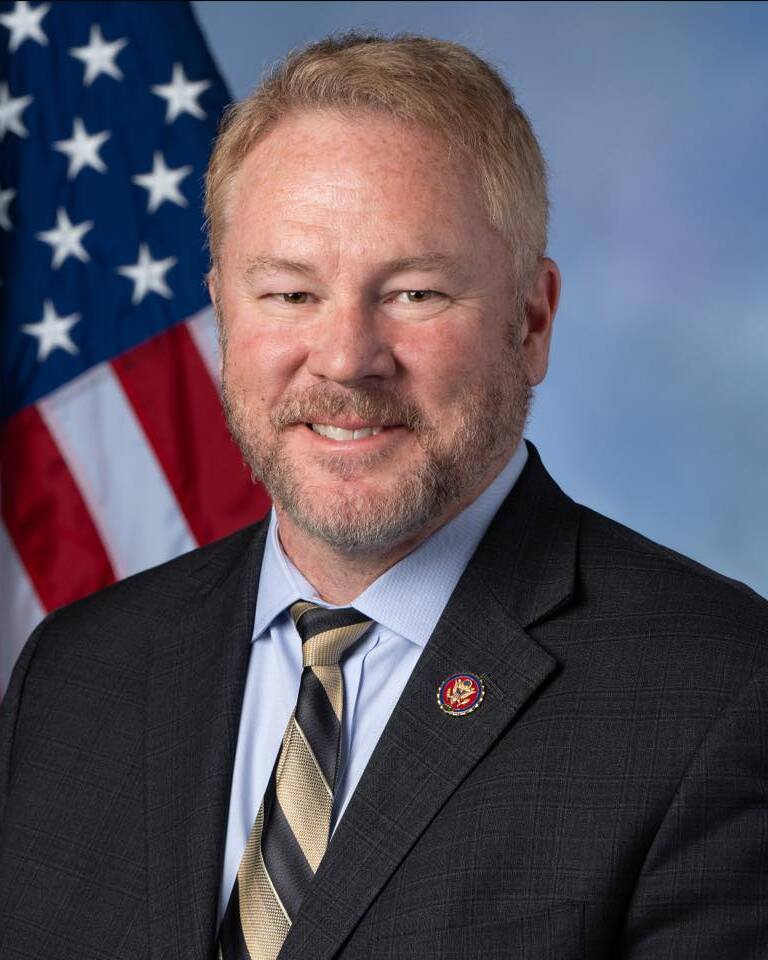

Nominee	Warren Davidson	Vanessa Enoch
Party	Republican	Democratic
Popular vote	168,689	154,828
Percentage	52.1%	47.9%
U.S. Representative before election
Warren Davidson
Republican
Elected U.S. Representative
Warren Davidson
Republican

Ohio's 8th congressional district boundary from the 2026 elections Interactive map version

The 8th district takes in the northern and western suburbs of Cincinnati, including most of Butler County. The incumbent is Republican Warren Davidson, who was re-elected with 62.8% of the vote in 2024.

=== Republican primary ===
==== Nominee ====
- Warren Davidson, incumbent U.S. representative

==== Endorsements ====
Warren Davidson

Executive branch officials

- Donald Trump, 45th and 47th president of the United States (2017–2021, 2025–present)

==== Fundraising ====
Campaign finance reports as of December 31, 2025
Candidate	Raised	Spent	Cash on hand
Warren Davidson (R)	$416,340	$322,622	$488,418
Source: Federal Election Commission

==== Results ====
Republican primary results
Party	Candidate	Votes	%
Republican	Warren Davidson (incumbent)	52,629	100.0
Total votes		52,629	100.0

=== Democratic primary ===
==== Nominee ====
- Vanessa Enoch, perennial candidate

==== Eliminated in primary ====
- Madaris Grant, businessman

==== Fundraising ====
Campaign finance reports as of December 31, 2025
Candidate	Raised	Spent	Cash on hand
Madaris Grant (D)	$16,327	$13,355	$2,972
Source: Federal Election Commission

==== Results ====
Democratic primary results
Party	Candidate	Votes	%
Democratic	Vanessa Enoch	32,336	74.5
Democratic	Madaris Grant	11,091	25.5
Total votes		43,427	100.0

=== General election ===
==== Predictions ====
Source	Ranking	As of
Decision Desk HQ	Likely R	July 14, 2026
The Cook Political Report	Solid R	November 2, 2025
Inside Elections	Solid R	October 31, 2025
Silver Bulletin	Solid R	November 3, 2026
Sabato's Crystal Ball	Safe R	April 10, 2025

==== Post-primary endorsements ====
Vanessa Enoch (D)

Political parties

- Working Families Party

Labor unions

- Ohio AFL-CIO

==== Fundraising ====
Campaign finance reports as of September 30, 2026
Candidate	Raised	Spent	Cash on hand
Warren Davidson (R)	$751,313	$713,886	$432,128
Vanessa Enoch (D)	$0	$0	$0
Source: Federal Election Commission

==== Results ====
2026 Ohio's 8th congressional district election
Party	Candidate	Votes	%
Republican	Warren Davidson (incumbent)	168,689	52.1%
Democratic	Vanessa Enoch	154,828	47.9%
Total votes		323,517	100%
Republican hold			

== District 9 ==
2026 Ohio's 9th congressional district election
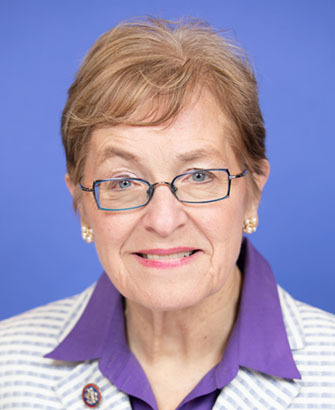

Nominee	Marcy Kaptur	Derek Merrin
Party	Democratic	Republican
Popular vote	159,306	142,830
Percentage	52.7%	47.3%
U.S. Representative before election
Marcy Kaptur
Democratic
Elected U.S. Representative
Marcy Kaptur
Democratic

Ohio's 9th congressional district boundary from the 2026 elections Interactive map version

The 9th district is based in Northwest Ohio, including Toledo and the western Lake Erie coast. The incumbent is Democrat Marcy Kaptur, who was reelected with 48.3% of the vote in 2024. The district was redrawn in 2025 in an effort to flip the district to the Republican Party. Despite this, Kaptur sought and won re-election with a larger margin compared to 2024.

=== Democratic primary ===
==== Nominee ====
- Marcy Kaptur, incumbent U.S. representative

==== Endorsements ====
Marcy Kaptur

Labor unions

- American Federation of Government Employees

Organizations

- Elect Democratic Women
- End Citizens United
- J Street
- Jewish Democratic Council of America
- Joint Action Committee for Political Affairs
- League of Conservation Voters Action Fund
- Planned Parenthood Action Fund
- Population Connection

==== Fundraising ====
Campaign finance reports as of March 31, 2026
Candidate	Raised	Spent	Cash on hand
Marcy Kaptur (D)	$3,385,266	$741,277	$3,092,916
Source: Federal Election Commission

==== Results ====
Democratic primary results
Party	Candidate	Votes	%
Democratic	Marcy Kaptur (incumbent)	45,827	100.0
Total votes		45,827	100.0

=== Republican primary ===
==== Nominee ====
- Derek Merrin, former state representative (2016–2025) and nominee for this district in 2024

==== Eliminated in primary ====
- Anthony Campbell, healthcare executive
- Alea Nadeem, lieutenant colonel in the Air National Guard
- Madison Sheahan, deputy director of U.S. Immigration and Customs Enforcement (2025–2026)
- Josh Williams, state representative (2023–present)

==== Declined ====
- Rob McColley, president of the Ohio Senate (2025–present) from the 1st district (2017–present) (running for lieutenant governor with Vivek Ramaswamy)
- Craig Riedel, former state representative and candidate for this district in 2022 and 2024 (running for state senate)

==== Withdrawn ====
- Wayne Kinsel, brewery owner

=== Endorsements ===
Derek Merrin

Executive branch officials

- Donald Trump, president of the United States (2017–2021, 2025–present)
Alea Nadeem

U.S. senators

- John Boozman, Arkansas (2011–present)
- Mike Crapo, Idaho (1999–present)

U.S. representatives

- Zach Nunn, IA-03 (2023–present)
Madison Sheahan

Statewide officials

- Jeff Landry, governor of Louisiana (2024–present)

Organizations

- Maggie's List
Josh Williams

Statewide officials

- Frank LaRose, Ohio secretary of state (2019–present)

State legislators

- Marilyn John, House majority leader (2025–present) from the 76th district (2023–present)

==== Fundraising ====
Italics indicate a withdrawn candidate.

Campaign finance reports as of March 31, 2026
Candidate	Raised	Spent	Cash on hand
Wayne Kinsel (R)	$90,564	$57,544	$33,020
Derek Merrin (R)	$757,425	$645,144	$188,933
Alea Nadeem (R)	$690,049	$581,088	$108,961
Josh Williams (R)	$851,766	$715,980	$135,786
Madison Sheahan (R)	$157,829	$90,335	$67,494
Source: Federal Election Commission

==== Polling ====
Poll source	Date(s) administered	Sample size	Margin of error	Derek Merrin	Alea Nadeem	Madison Sheahan	Josh Williams	Undecided
J.L. Partners (R)	April 11–16, 2026	600 (LV)	± 4.1%	33%	4%	10%	14%	39%

==== Results ====
Republican primary results
Party	Candidate	Votes	%
Republican	Derek Merrin	25,092	44.1
Republican	Josh Williams	14,419	25.3
Republican	Madison Sheahan	11,501	20.2
Republican	Alea Nadeem	3,109	5.5
Republican	Anthony Campbell	2,800	4.9
Total votes		56,921	100.00

=== Libertarian primary ===
==== Not on Ballot ====
- Matthew Althaus, manufacturing manager

==== Eliminated in primary ====
- David Gedert, small-business owner

==== Results ====
Libertarian primary results
Party	Candidate	Votes	%
Libertarian	Matthew Althaus	535	59.3
Libertarian	David Gedert	368	40.7
Total votes		903	100.0

=== General election ===
==== Predictions ====
Source	Ranking	As of
Decision Desk HQ	Likely D	November 3, 2026
The Cook Political Report	Lean D	October 30, 2026
Inside Elections	Tilt D	October 29, 2026
Silver Bulletin	Lean D	November 3, 2026
Sabato's Crystal Ball	Lean D	November 2, 2026

==== Post-primary endorsements ====
Marcy Kaptur (D)

Labor unions

- Ohio AFL-CIO
- Ohio Conference of Teamsters
Derek Merrin (R)

Organizations

- NRCC MAGA Majority
- U.S. Chamber of Commerce

==== Fundraising ====
Campaign finance reports as of October 14, 2026
Candidate	Raised	Spent	Cash on hand
Marcy Kaptur (D)	$5,910,481	$5,661,900	$697,508
Derek Merrin (R)	$2,217,821	$1,845,006	$449,466
Matthew Althaus (L)	$0	$0	$0
Source: Federal Election Commission

==== Polling ====
Poll source	Date(s) administered	Sample size	Margin of error	Marcy Kaptur (D)	Derek Merrin (R)	Other	Undecided
RedBox Research (D)	October 20-23, 2026	858 (LV)	± 4.5%	49%	43%	4% (Note: "Prefer not to answer" with 2%; "Someone else" with 2%)	3%
DCCC Analytics Department	September 22–23, 2026	481 (LV)	± 4.5%	48%	48%	–	4%
McLaughlin & Associates (R) (Note: Poll sponsored by the NRCC)	April 18–20, 2026	400 (LV)	± 4.9%	43%	47%	3% (Note: David Gedert (L) with 3%)	7%

==== Results ====
2026 Ohio's 9th congressional district election
Party	Candidate	Votes	%
Democratic	Marcy Kaptur (incumbent)	159,306	52.7%
Republican	Derek Merrin	142,830	47.3%
Total votes		302,136	100%
Democratic hold			

== District 10 ==
2026 Ohio's 10th congressional district election

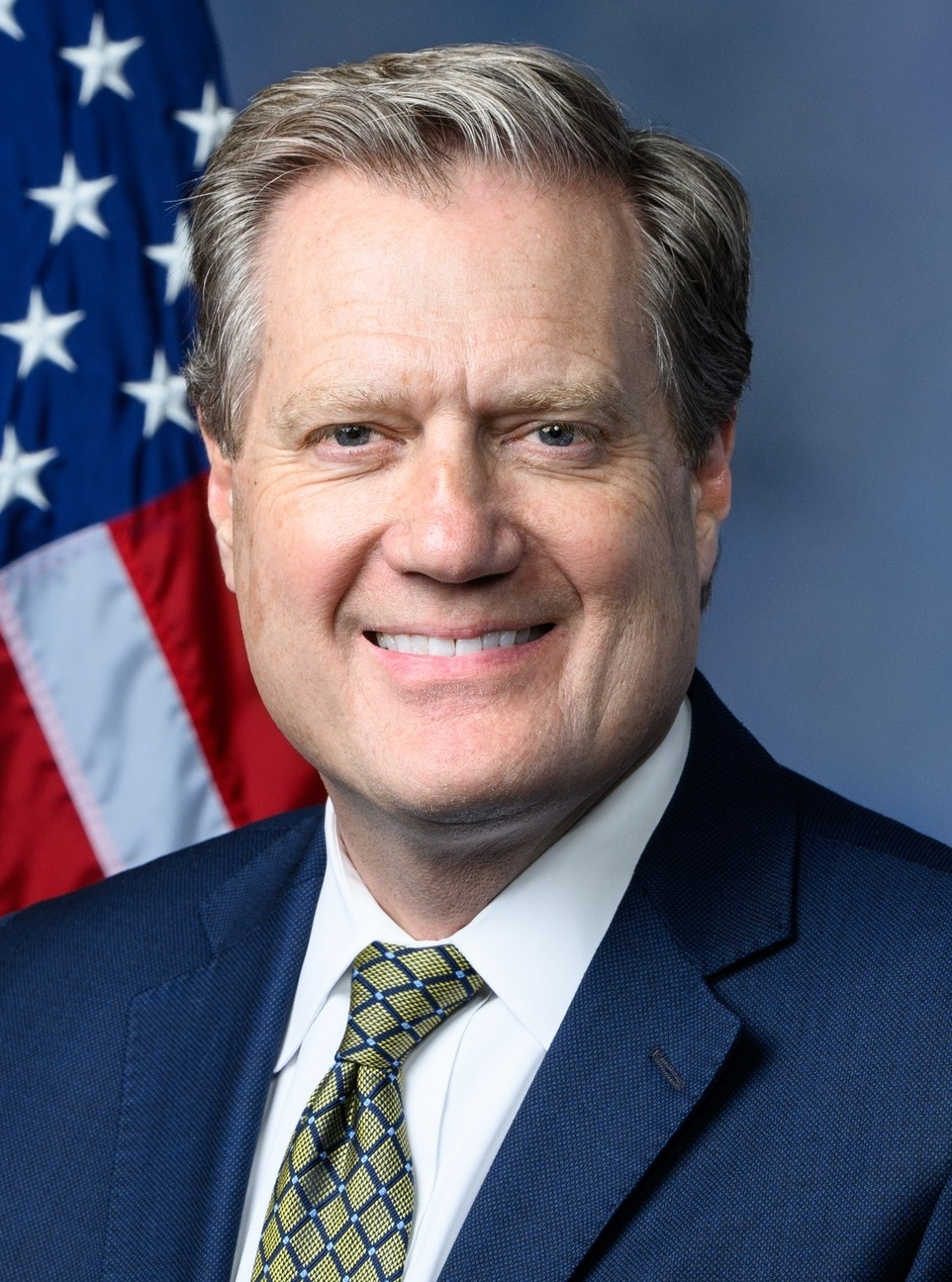
Nominee	Kristina Knickerbocker	Mike Turner
Party	Democratic	Republican
Popular vote	149,024	144,086
Percentage	49.3%	47.7%
U.S. Representative before election
Mike Turner
Republican
Elected U.S. Representative
Kristina Knickerbocker
Democratic

Ohio's 10th congressional district boundary from the 2026 elections Interactive map version

The new 10th district encompasses the Dayton metro area, including Dayton and the surrounding suburbs, as well as Middletown. The incumbent is Republican Mike Turner, who was re-elected with 57.6% of the vote in 2024.

=== Republican primary ===
==== Nominee ====
- Mike Turner, incumbent U.S. representative

==== Endorsements ====
Mike Turner

Executive branch officials

- Donald Trump, 45th and 47th president of the United States (2017–2021, 2025–present)

Labor unions

- American Federation of Government Employees

Organizations

- Log Cabin Republicans

==== Fundraising ====
Campaign finance reports as of March 31, 2026
Candidate	Raised	Spent	Cash on hand
Mike Turner (R)	$755,118	$627,509	$558,033
Source: Federal Election Commission

==== Results ====
Republican primary results
Party	Candidate	Votes	%
Republican	Mike Turner (incumbent)	44,286	100.0
Total votes		44,286	100.0

=== Democratic primary ===
==== Nominee ====
- Kristina Knickerbocker, U.S. Air Force veteran

==== Eliminated in primary ====
- Janice Beckett, attorney
- David Esrati, nominee for this seat in 2022, candidate for this district in 2012 and 2024, and candidate for the 3rd district in 2010
- Manuel Foggie, attorney
- Jan Kinner, consultant
- Tony Pombo, candidate for this district in 2024

==== Endorsements ====
Kristina Knickerbocker

Organizations

- EMILYs List
- End Citizens United

==== Fundraising ====
Campaign finance reports as of March 31, 2026
Candidate	Raised	Spent	Cash on hand
Tony Pombo (D)	$157,718 (Note: $125,000 of this total was self-funded by Pombo.)	$16,186	$143,167
Kristina Knickerbocker (D)	$115,579 (Note: $7,000 of this total was self-funded by Knickerbocker.)	$83,659	$31,920
Janice Beckett (D)	$13,641 (Note: $3,000 of this total was self-funded by Beckett.)	$8,941	$4,669
Jan Kinner (D)	$11,360 (Note: $10,815 of this total was self-funded by Kinner.)	$9,851	$1,509
David Esrati (D)	$0	$0	$0
Source: Federal Election Commission

==== Results ====
Democratic primary results
Party	Candidate	Votes	%
Democratic	Kristina Knickerbocker	14,824	32.7
Democratic	Janice Beckett	11,766	25.9
Democratic	David Esrati	5,829	12.8
Democratic	Jan Kinner	5,601	12.3
Democratic	Tony Pombo	3,754	8.3
Democratic	Manuel Foggie	3,606	8.0
Total votes		45,380	100.0

=== Libertarian primary ===
==== Nominee ====
- Thomas McMasters, former mayor of Huber Heights and independent candidate for this district in 2016

==== Results ====
Libertarian primary results
Party	Candidate	Votes	%
Libertarian	Thomas McMasters	809	100.0
Total votes		809	100.0

=== General election ===
==== Predictions ====
Source	Ranking	As of
Decision Desk HQ	Likely R	July 14, 2026
The Cook Political Report	Lean R	October 16, 2026
Inside Elections	Lean R	October 29, 2026
Silver Bulletin	Lean R	November 3, 2026
Sabato's Crystal Ball	Lean R	October 27, 2026

==== Post-primary endorsements ====
Kristina Knickerbocker (D)

U.S. senators

- Mark Kelly, Arizona (2020–present)

U.S. representatives

- Greg Stanton, AZ-04 (2019–present)

Labor unions

- Ohio AFL-CIO

Organizations

- Elect Democratic Women
- Leaders We Deserve
- NewDem Action Fund
- Reproductive Freedom for All
Mike Turner (R)

Labor unions

- Ohio Conference of Teamsters

Organizations

- U.S. Chamber of Commerce

==== Fundraising ====
Campaign finance reports as of October 14, 2026
Candidate	Raised	Spent	Cash on hand
Mike Turner (R)	$1,315,094	$1,420,269	$325,250
Kristina Knickerbocker (D)	$1,015,878	$882,433	$133,445
Thomas McMasters (L)	$22,086	$22,086	$0
Source: Federal Election Commission

==== Polling ====
Poll source	Date(s) administered	Sample size	Margin of error	Mike Turner (R)	Kristina Knickerbocker (D)	Thomas McMasters (L)	Undecided
DCCC (D) (Note: Poll sponsored by House Majority PAC, which is focused on electing Democrats to the U.S. House of Representatives)	October 12–13, 2026	535 (LV)	± 4.2%	44%	47%	4%	5%
Global Strategy Group (D) (Note: Poll sponsored by Knickerbocker's campaign)	July 20–23, 2026	700 (LV)	± 4.0%	49%	42%	—	9%
Global Strategy Group (D)	July 20–23, 2026	700 (LV)	± 4.0%	45%	40%	4%	11%
FM3 Research (D)	July 6–12, 2026	535 (LV)	—	48%	41%	—	11%

Hypothetical polling

Generic Republican vs. generic Democrat

Poll source	Date(s) administered	Sample size	Margin of error	Generic Republican	Generic Democrat	Undecided
FM3 Research (D)	July 6–12, 2026	535 (LV)	—	47%	48%	5%

==== Results ====
2026 Ohio's 10th congressional district election
Party	Candidate	Votes	%
Democratic	Kristina Knickerbocker	149,024	49.3%
Republican	Mike Turner (incumbent)	144,086	47.7%
Libertarian	Thomas McMasters	8,906	2.9%
Total votes		302,016	100%
Democratic gain from Republican			

== District 11 ==
2026 Ohio's 11th congressional district election
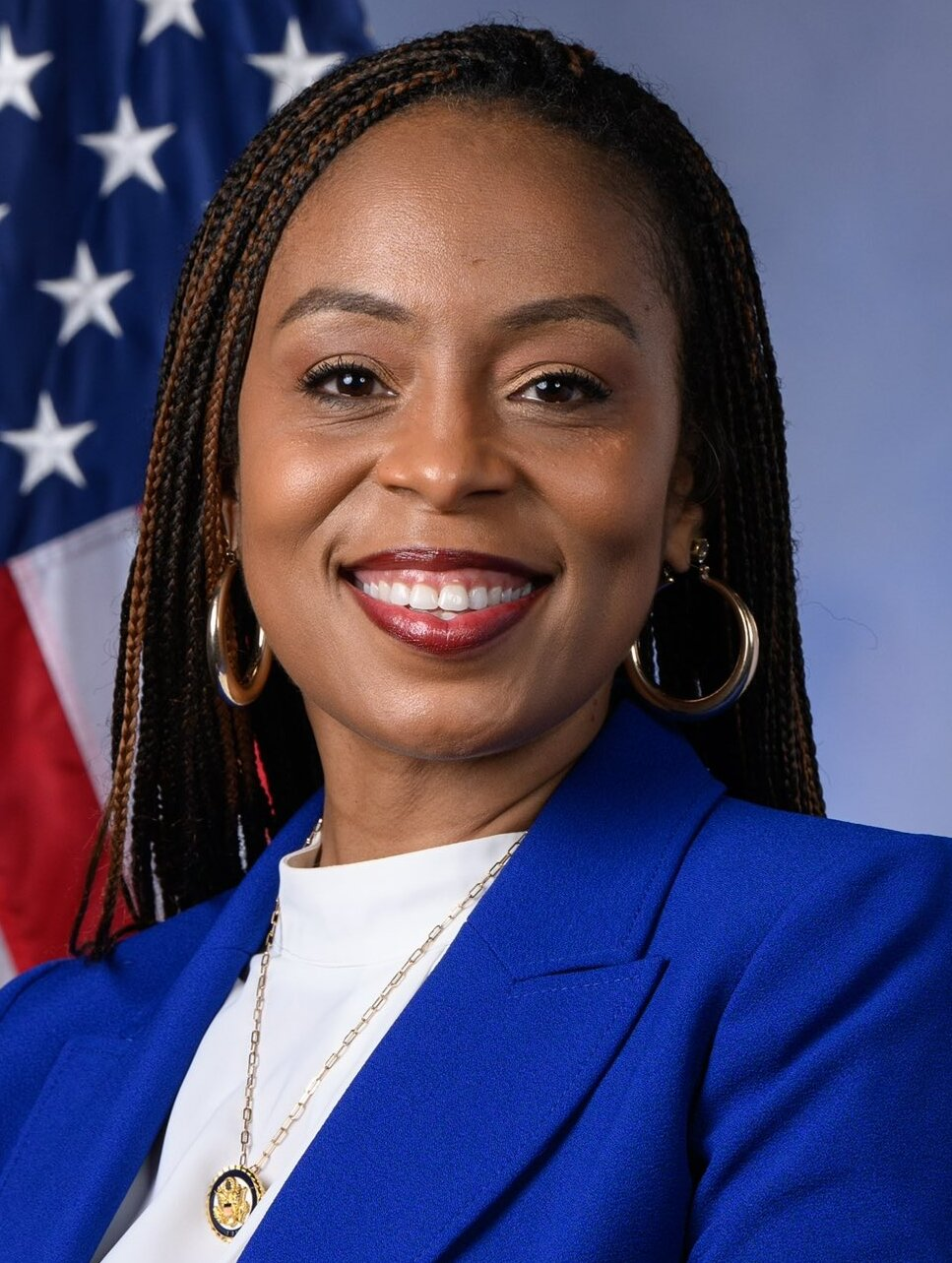

Nominee	Shontel Brown	Mike Kirchner
Party	Democratic	Republican
Popular vote	219,971	43,373
Percentage	83.5%	16.5%
U.S. Representative before election
Shontel Brown
Democratic
Elected U.S. Representative
Shontel Brown
Democratic

Ohio's 11th congressional district boundary from the 2026 elections Interactive map version

The 11th district takes in Cleveland and its inner suburbs, including Euclid, Cleveland Heights, and Warrensville Heights. The incumbent is Democrat Shontel Brown, who was re-elected with 78.3% of the vote in 2024.

=== Democratic primary ===
==== Nominee ====
- Shontel Brown, incumbent U.S. representative

==== Eliminated in primary ====
- Sean Freeman, analyst
- Ardelia Holmes, educator

==== Endorsements ====
Shontel Brown

Labor unions

- American Federation of Government Employees

Organizations

- AIPAC
- Democratic Majority for Israel
- National Women's Political Caucus
- Planned Parenthood Action Fund

==== Fundraising ====
Campaign finance reports as of December 31, 2025
Candidate	Raised	Spent	Cash on hand
Shontel Brown (D)	$672,084	$439,230	$1,088,668
Source: Federal Election Commission

==== Results ====
Democratic primary results
Party	Candidate	Votes	%
Democratic	Shontel Brown (incumbent)	70,357	85.5
Democratic	Ardelia Holmes	6,529	7.9
Democratic	Sean Freeman	5,421	6.6
Total votes		82,307	100.0

=== Republican primary ===
==== Nominee ====
- Mike Kirchner, retired consulting actuary

==== Eliminated in primary ====
- James Hemphill, general contractor and candidate for this district in 2022 and 2024

==== Results ====
Republican primary results
Party	Candidate	Votes	%
Republican	Mike Kirchner	6,949	65.6
Republican	James Hemphill	3,648	34.4
Total votes		10,597	100.0

=== General election ===
==== Post-primary endorsements ====
Shontel Brown (D)

Labor unions

- Ohio AFL-CIO
- Ohio Conference of Teamsters

Organizations

- Elect Democratic Women
- Giffords

==== Predictions ====
Source	Ranking	As of
Decision Desk HQ	Safe D	July 14, 2026
The Cook Political Report	Solid D	November 2, 2025
Inside Elections	Solid D	October 31, 2025
Silver Bulletin	Solid D	November 3, 2026
Sabato's Crystal Ball	Safe D	April 10, 2025

==== Fundraising ====
Campaign finance reports as of April 15, 2026
Candidate	Raised	Spent	Cash on hand
Shontel Brown (D)	$863,501	$692,383	$1,026,932
Mike Krichner (R)	$0	$0	$0
Source: Federal Election Commission

==== Results ====
2026 Ohio's 11th congressional district election
Party	Candidate	Votes	%
Democratic	Shontel Brown (incumbent)	219,971	83.5%
Republican	Mike Krichner	43,373	16.5%
Total votes		263,344	100%
Democratic hold			

== District 12 ==
2026 Ohio's 12th congressional district election
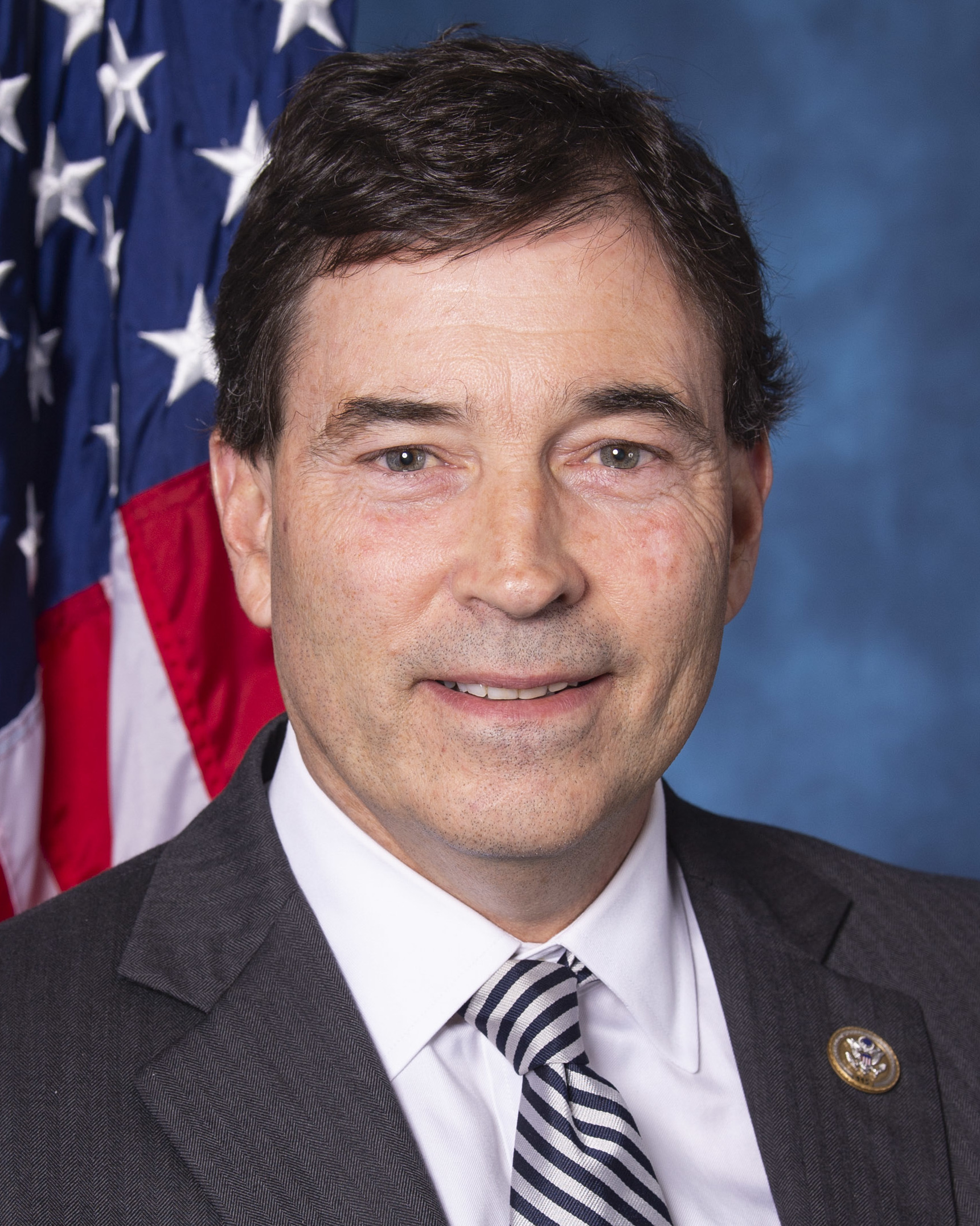

Nominee	Troy Balderson	Jerrad Christian
Party	Republican	Democratic
Popular vote	191,926	131,211
Percentage	59.4%	40.6%
U.S. Representative before election
Troy Balderson
Republican
Elected U.S. Representative
Troy Balderson
Republican

Ohio's 12th congressional district boundary from the 2026 elections Interactive map version

The 12th district encompasses area of Ohio east of the Columbus metro area, taking in Newark, Zanesville, and Mount Vernon. The incumbent is Republican Troy Balderson, who was re-elected with 68.6% of the vote in 2024.

=== Republican primary ===
==== Nominee ====
- Troy Balderson, incumbent U.S. representative

==== Endorsements ====
Troy Balderson

Executive branch officials

- Donald Trump, 45th and 47th president of the United States (2017–2021, 2025–present)

==== Fundraising ====
Campaign finance reports as of December 31, 2025
Candidate	Raised	Spent	Cash on hand
Troy Balderson (R)	$1,041,656	$500,413	$1,547,668
Source: Federal Election Commission

==== Results ====
Republican primary results
Party	Candidate	Votes	%
Republican	Troy Balderson (incumbent)	64,907	100.0
Total votes		64,907	100.0

=== Democratic primary ===
==== Nominee ====
- Jerrad Christian, IT specialist and nominee for this district in 2024

==== Eliminated in primary ====
- Daniel Crawford, community activist
- Jason Reynard, bartender

==== Endorsements ====
Jerrad Christian

Organizations

- Track AIPAC

==== Fundraising ====
Campaign finance reports as of December 31, 2025
Candidate	Raised	Spent	Cash on hand
Jerrad Christian (D)	$15,359	$7,401	$11,715
Source: Federal Election Commission

==== Results ====
Democratic primary results
Party	Candidate	Votes	%
Democratic	Jerrad Christian	15,961	46.4
Democratic	Daniel Crawford	11,546	33.6
Democratic	Jason Reynard	6,899	20.0
Total votes		34,406	100.0

=== General election ===
==== Predictions ====
Source	Ranking	As of
Decision Desk HQ	Safe R	July 14, 2026
The Cook Political Report	Solid R	November 2, 2025
Inside Elections	Solid R	October 31, 2025
Sabato's Crystal Ball	Safe R	April 10, 2025

==== Post-primary endorsements ====
Jerrad Christian (D)

Labor unions

- Ohio AFL-CIO

==== Fundraising ====
Campaign finance reports as of July 15, 2026
Candidate	Raised	Spent	Cash on hand
Troy Balderson (R)	$1,743,281	$767,354	$1,982,352
Jerrad Christian (D)	$84,378	$69,210	$18,925
Source: Federal Election Commission

==== Results ====
2026 Ohio's 12th congressional district election
Party	Candidate	Votes	%
Republican	Troy Balderson (incumbent)	191,926	59.4%
Democratic	Jerrad Christian	131,211	40.6%
Total votes		323,137	100%
Republican hold			

== District 13 ==
2026 Ohio's 13th congressional district election
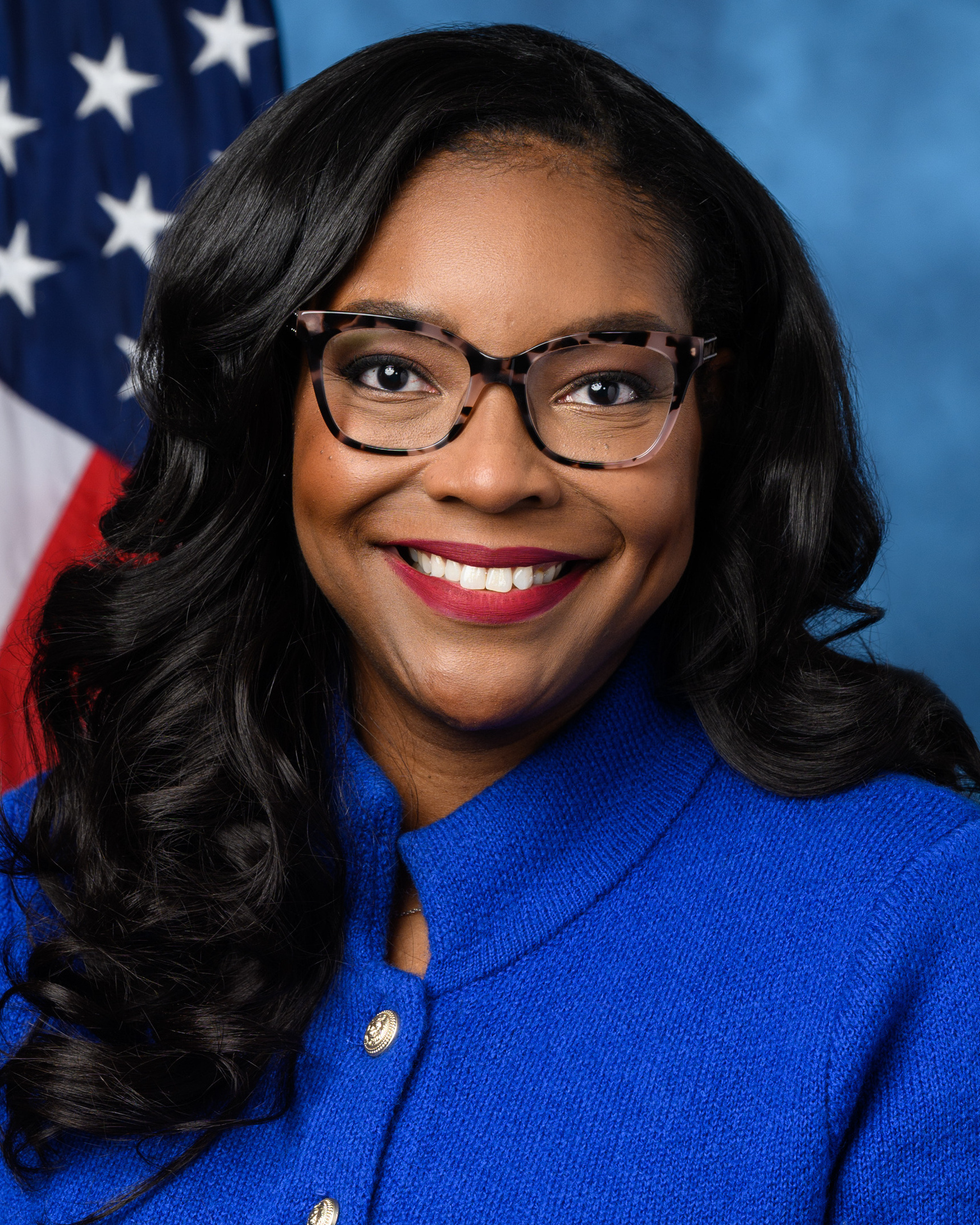

Nominee	Emilia Sykes	Carey Coleman
Party	Democratic	Republican
Popular vote	190,593	122,078
Percentage	60%	38.4%
U.S. Representative before election
Emilia Sykes
Democratic
Elected U.S. Representative
Emilia Sykes
Democratic

Ohio's 13th congressional district boundary from the 2026 elections Interactive map version

The 13th district includes most of the Akron-Canton population corridor, taking in all of Summit County and parts of Portage and Stark counties. The incumbent is Democrat Emilia Sykes, who was re-elected with 51.1% of the vote in 2024.

=== Democratic primary ===
==== Nominee ====
- Emilia Sykes, incumbent U.S. representative

==== Endorsements ====
Emilia Sykes

Labor unions

- American Federation of Government Employees

Organizations

- AIPAC
- Council for a Livable World
- Democratic Majority for Israel
- Elect Democratic Women
- EMILY's List
- End Citizens United
- Giffords
- J Street
- Jewish Democratic Council of America
- Joint Action Committee for Political Affairs
- National Women's Political Caucus
- Planned Parenthood Action Fund
- Reproductive Freedom for All

==== Fundraising ====
Campaign finance reports as of December 31, 2025
Candidate	Raised	Spent	Cash on hand
Emilia Sykes (D)	$1,840,007	$663,098	$1,299,587
Source: Federal Election Commission

==== Results ====
Democratic primary results
Party	Candidate	Votes	%
Democratic	Emilia Sykes (incumbent)	62,768	100.0
Total votes		62,768	100.0

=== Republican primary ===
==== Nominee ====
- Carey Coleman, radio host

==== Eliminated in primary ====
- Margaret Briem, businesswoman and Summit county council candidate in 2022
- Sanjin Drakovac, physician
- Neil Patel, businessman
- Kevin Siembida, mayor of Leetonia (2016–present)

==== Withdrawn ====
- Jeremy Caudill, Springfield Township trustee
- Kevin Coughlin, former state senator and nominee for this district in 2024

==== Endorsements ====
Carey Coleman

Party chapters

- Summit County GOP
Kevin Siembida

U.S. representatives

- John McGuire, VA-05 (2025–present)
Kevin Coughlin (Withdrawn)

U.S. senators

- Jon Husted, Ohio (2025–present)
- Bernie Moreno, Ohio (2025–present)

U.S. representatives

- Troy Balderson, OH-12 (2018–present)
- Mike Carey, OH-15 (2021–present)
- Warren Davidson, OH-08 (2016–present)
- Jim Jordan, OH-04 (2007–present)
- Dave Joyce, OH-14 (2013–present)
- Bob Latta, OH-05 (2007–present)
- Max Miller, OH-07 (2023–present)
- Michael Rulli, OH-06 (2018–present)
- Dave Taylor, OH-02 (2025–present)
- Mike Turner, OH-10 (2003–present)

==== Fundraising ====
Italics indicate a withdrawn candidate

Campaign finance reports as of December 31, 2025
Candidate	Raised	Spent	Cash on hand
Margaret Briem (R)	$2,939	$1,630	$1,308
Kevin Coughlin (R)	$561,363	$333,565	$284,416
Source: Federal Election Commission

==== Results ====
Republican primary results
Party	Candidate	Votes	%
Republican	Carey Coleman	20,322	47.3
Republican	Kevin Siembida	8,062	18.7
Republican	Margaret Briem	7,274	16.9
Republican	Neil Patel	6,238	14.5
Republican	Sanjin Drakovac	1,105	2.6
Total votes		43,001	100.0

=== Independents ===
==== Filed paperwork ====
- Sandeep Dixit, software architect

==== Fundraising ====
Campaign finance reports as of December 31, 2025
Candidate	Raised	Spent	Cash on hand
Sandeep Dixit (I)	$26,801	$19,521	$7,279
Source: Federal Election Commission

=== General election ===
==== Predictions ====
Source	Ranking	As of
Decision Desk HQ	Likely D	July 14, 2026
The Cook Political Report	Likely D	April 7, 2026
Inside Elections	Solid D	March 12, 2026
Sabato's Crystal Ball	Likely D	March 26, 2026

==== Post-primary endorsements ====
Emilia Sykes (D)

U.S. senators

- Angela Alsobrooks, Maryland (2025–present)

Labor unions

- Ohio AFL-CIO
- Ohio Conference of Teamsters

==== Fundraising ====
Campaign finance reports as of September 30, 2026
Candidate	Raised	Spent	Cash on hand
Emilia Sykes (D)	$3,866,658	$2,886,813	$1,102,523
Carey Coleman (R)	$166,731	$106,047	$60,684
Source: Federal Election Commission

==== Results ====
2026 Ohio's 13th congressional district election
Party	Candidate	Votes	%
Democratic	Emilia Sykes (incumbent)	190,593	60.0%
Republican	Carey Coleman	122,078	38.4%
Independent	Sandeep Dixit	5,104	1.6%
Total votes		317,775	100%
Democratic hold			

== District 14 ==
2026 Ohio's 14th congressional district election
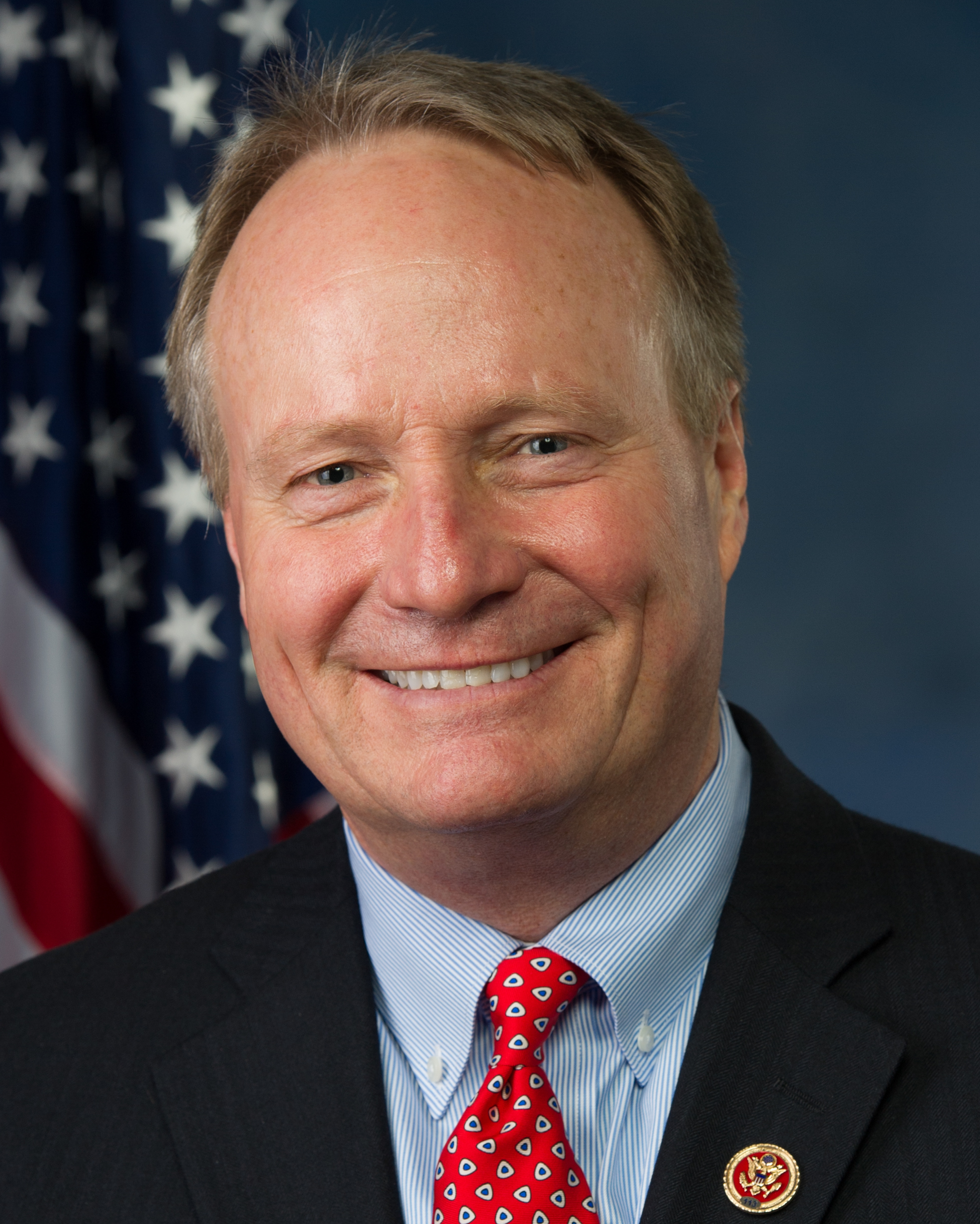

Nominee	David Joyce	Maria Jukic
Party	Republican	Democratic
Popular vote	179,467	146,651
Percentage	55%	45%
U.S. Representative before election
David Joyce
Republican
Elected U.S. Representative
David Joyce
Republican

Ohio's 14th congressional district boundary from the 2026 elections Interactive map version

The 14th district is located in Northeast Ohio, taking in the eastern suburbs and exurbs of Cleveland, Ohio. The incumbent is Republican David Joyce, who was re-elected with 63.4% of the vote in 2024.

=== Republican primary ===
==== Nominee ====
- David Joyce, incumbent U.S. representative

==== Eliminated in primary ====
- Nicole Frenchko, former Trumbull County commissioner

==== Withdrawn ====
- Mark Zetzer, field technician and nominee for the 11th district in 2014

==== Endorsements ====
David Joyce

Executive branch officials

- Donald Trump, 45th and 47th president of the United States (2017–2021, 2025–present)

Organizations

- Log Cabin Republicans

==== Fundraising ====
Campaign finance reports as of December 31, 2025
Candidate	Raised	Spent	Cash on hand
David Joyce (R)	$767,292	$249,183	$3,260,984
Source: Federal Election Commission

==== Results ====
Republican primary results
Party	Candidate	Votes	%
Republican	David Joyce (incumbent)	49,119	70.3
Republican	Nicole Frenchko	20,744	29.7
Total votes		69,863	100.0

=== Democratic primary ===
==== Nominee ====
- Maria Jukic, former Euclid City Council member

==== Eliminated in primary ====
- Bill O'Neill, former justice of the Ohio Supreme Court (2013–2018), nominee for this district in 2008 and 2010, and candidate for governor in 2018
- Carl Setzer, restaurateur

==== Results ====
Democratic primary results
Party	Candidate	Votes	%
Democratic	Maria Jukic	25,119	50.8
Democratic	Bill O'Neill	17,726	35.8
Democratic	Carl Setzer	6,651	13.4
Total votes		49,496	100.0

=== General election ===
==== Post-primary endorsements ====
David Joyce (R)

Labor unions

- American Federation of Government Employees
- Ohio Conference of Teamsters

Organizations

- U.S. Chamber of Commerce

==== Predictions ====
Source	Ranking	As of
Decision Desk HQ	Safe R	July 14, 2026
The Cook Political Report	Solid R	November 2, 2025
Inside Elections	Solid R	October 31, 2025
Sabato's Crystal Ball	Safe R	April 10, 2025

==== Fundraising ====
Campaign finance reports as of April 15, 2026
Candidate	Raised	Spent	Cash on hand
David Joyce (R)	$1,097,010	$924,621	$2,916,264
Maria Jukic (D)	$21,056	$13,979	$7,076
Source: Federal Election Commission

==== Results ====
2026 Ohio's 14th congressional district election
Party	Candidate	Votes	%
Republican	David Joyce (incumbent)	179,467	55.0%
Democratic	Maria Jukic	146,651	45.0%
Total votes		326,118	100%
Republican hold			

== District 15 ==
2026 Ohio's 15th congressional district election

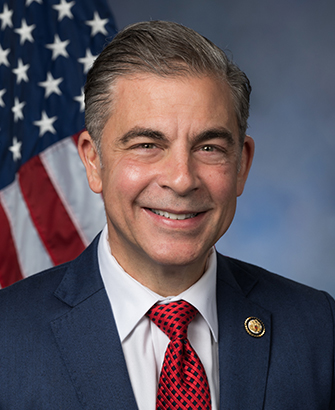
Nominee	Don Leonard	Mike Carey
Party	Democratic	Republican
Popular vote	149,287	130,225
Percentage	51.9%	45.3%
U.S. Representative before election
Mike Carey
Republican
Elected U.S. Representative
Don Leonard
Democratic

Ohio's 15th congressional district boundary from the 2026 elections Interactive map version

The 15th district encompasses the southwestern Columbus metro area, taking in the western, southern, and some northern suburbs of Columbus, including Dublin, Hilliard, and Grove City. The incumbent is Republican Mike Carey, who was re-elected with 56.5% of the vote in 2024.

Democratic challenger Don Leonard defeated Carey in what was considered an upset victory.

=== Republican primary ===
==== Nominee ====
- Mike Carey, incumbent U.S. representative

==== Eliminated in primary ====
- Samuel Ronan, candidate for the 1st district in 2018

==== Endorsements ====
Mike Carey

Executive branch officials

- Donald Trump, president of the United States (2017–2021, 2025–present)

Organizations

- Log Cabin Republicans

Political parties

- Pickaway County Republican Party

==== Fundraising ====
Campaign finance reports as of March 31, 2026
Candidate	Raised	Spent	Cash on hand
Mike Carey (R)	$2,509,555	$1,127,899	$1,542,951
Source: Federal Election Commission

==== Results ====
Republican primary results
Party	Candidate	Votes	%
Republican	Mike Carey (incumbent)	39,446	100.0
Total votes		39,446	100.0

=== Democratic primary ===
==== Nominee ====
- Don Leonard, educator

==== Eliminated in primary ====
- Adam Miller, former state representative from the 6th district (2017–2025) and nominee for this district in 1998 and 2024

==== Endorsements ====
Don Leonard

Organizations

- CAIR Action
Adam Miller

Statewide officials

- Ted Strickland, former governor of Ohio (2007–2011)

Labor unions

- American Federation of Government Employees

Organizations

- Population Connection
Declined to endorse

Political parties

- Franklin County Democratic Party
- Ohio Democratic Party

==== Fundraising ====
Campaign finance reports as of March 31, 2026
Candidate	Raised	Spent	Cash on hand
Don Leonard (D)	$261,394	$114,946	$146,448
Adam Miller (D)	$779,132	$367,790	$414,955
Source: Federal Election Commission

==== Results ====
Democratic primary results
Party	Candidate	Votes	%
Democratic	Don Leonard	23,798	52.9
Democratic	Adam Miller	21,179	47.1
Total votes		44,977	100.0

=== Libertarian primary ===
==== Nominee ====
- Brennan Barrington, engineer

==== Results ====
Libertarian primary results
Party	Candidate	Votes	%
Libertarian	Brennan Barrington	489	100.0
Total votes		489	100.0

=== General election ===
==== Post-primary endorsements ====
Mike Carey (R)

Labor unions

- Ohio Conference of Teamsters

Organizations

- U.S. Chamber of Commerce
Don Leonard (D)

Labor Unions

- American Federation of Government Employees

Organizations

- End Citizens United
- Reproductive Freedom for All
- Track AIPAC

==== Predictions ====
Source	Ranking	As of
Decision Desk HQ	Likely R	July 14, 2026
The Cook Political Report	Lean R	October 16, 2026
Inside Elections	Lean R	October 29, 2026
Silver Bulletin	Lean R	November 3, 2026
Sabato's Crystal Ball	Lean R	October 27, 2026
The Economist	Lean R	April 24, 2026

==== Fundraising ====
Campaign finance reports as of June 30, 2026
Candidate	Raised	Spent	Cash on hand
Mike Carey (R)	$3,299,678	$1,404,260	$2,056,712
Don Leonard (D)	$606,657	$354,255	$252,401
Brennan Barrington (L)	$0	$0	$0
Source: Federal Election Commission

==== Polling ====
Poll source	Date(s) administered	Sample size	Margin of error	Mike Carey (R)	Don Leonard (D)	Brennan Barrington (L)	Undecided
Hart Research (D)	October 9–12, 2026	503 (LV)	–	45%	48%	–	7%
Hart Research (D)	September 22–24, 2026	500 (LV)	–	45%	46%	–	9%
Hart Research (D) (Note: Poll sponsored by Leonard's campaign.)	August 6–9, 2026	401 (LV)	± 4.9%	41%	37%	10%	12%
Hart Research (D)	June 23–25, 2026	550 (LV)	–	45%	40%	3%	12%

Hypothetical polling

Generic Republican vs. generic Democrat

Poll source	Date(s) administered	Sample size	Margin of error	Generic Republican	Generic Democrat	Undecided
Hart Research (D)	June 23–25, 2026	550 (LV)	–	44%	47%	9%

==== Results ====
2026 Ohio's 15th congressional district election
Party	Candidate	Votes	%
Democratic	Don Leonard	149,287	51.9%
Republican	Mike Carey (incumbent)	130,225	45.3%
Libertarian	Brennan Barrington	8,135	2.8%
Total votes		287,647	100%
Democratic gain from Republican			

== See also ==
- 2026 Ohio elections

== Notes ==
Partisan clients
