= Caleb Stidham =

American politician

Member of the Ohio House of Representatives from the 89th district
- Incumbent
- Assumed office November 10, 2026
- Preceded by: D. J. Swearingen

Personal details
- Party: Republican
- Website: Official website

Caleb Stidham is an American politician who is the member for the 89th district of the Ohio House of Representatives, sworn into office on November 10, 2026. He was elected in the 2026 election. He was Erie County Treasurer and chairman of the Erie County Republican Party. After his election in 2026 Stidham was appointed to fill the vacancy left by the resignation of his predecessor D. J. Swearingen.
