= Steve Kraus =

American politician

Member of the Ohio House of Representatives from the 89th district
- In office January 5, 2015 – July 27, 2015
- Preceded by: Chris Redfern
- Succeeded by: Steve Arndt

Personal details
- Born: July 28, 1959 (age 66) Bowling Green, Ohio, U.S.
- Party: Republican
- Education: Air University; Troy University (BS)

Steven W. Kraus (born July 28, 1959) is an American politician who served in the Ohio House of Representatives representing the 89th district from January 5, 2015, until his felony conviction seven months later.

== Biography ==
Steven W. Kraus attended the Community College of the Air Force of Air University before receiving his bachelor's in engineering from Troy University.

Kraus' election was also significant due to his defeat of Chris Redfern, a long-serving state representative and the Chairman of the Ohio Democratic Party at the time. After winning election, but prior to his swearing in, Kraus was indicted on felony charges of burglary, breaking and entering, and theft. Kraus was convicted of a fifth-degree felony on July 27, 2015, and, according to the Ohio Revised Code, immediately relinquished his seat as a result of his conviction.

Kraus wrote a book published in February 2018, Checkmate: One Man's Fight Against Political Corruption.

On December 19, 2023, Kraus filed his declaration of candidacy for Ohio House with the Erie County, Ohio board of elections to run for state representative and an objection was filed shortly after due to his felony conviction, which, by then had been sealed.

On January 29, 2024, the Ohio Supreme Court unanimously ruled Kraus could run and hold office again as an Ohio House member after Erie County election officials placed Kraus' name on the March 19, 2024 primary-election ballot because his theft conviction was irrelevant because the law only disqualifies him from certain kinds of public office, mainly office that grants him "substantial management or control" over state property.

== Bibliography ==
- Checkmate: One Man's Fight Against Political Corruption by Steve Kraus (2018) ISBN 0-692-06872-4
