= Steve Arndt =

Republican representative

Member of the Ohio House of Representatives from the 89th District
- In office September 30, 2015 – July 31, 2019
- Preceded by: Steve Kraus
- Succeeded by: Douglas Swearingen, Jr.

Personal details
- Born: April 28, 1954 (age 72) Port Clinton, Ohio
- Party: Republican

Steven Arndt (born April 28, 1954) is a former Republican representative for the 89th district of the Ohio House of Representatives. Arndt has run for various public offices since the 1970s. When Steve Kraus was convicted of a felony and forced to resign from office, Arndt was selected by the Ohio House Republican Caucus to replace him. He took office on September 30, 2015. Subsequently, Arndt was reelected in 2016.

== Political stances ==
=== Women's healthcare funding ===
One of Arndt's first votes in the state legislature was on HB 294, which aimed to defund Planned Parenthood. He voted in favor of the bill, as did nearly every Republican in the chamber. In response to the vote, Minority Leader Fred Strahorn said, "Planned Parenthood provides low-cost preventative care to tens of thousands of women in Ohio. Defunding these effective and cost-efficient programs will put women and families in our underserved communities at risk."

=== Public works projects ===
Arndt voted in favor of "legislation to ban local hiring standards and restrict project labor agreements (PLAs) for public works projects." Debate around the issue at the time focused on the likelihood that the legislation would push jobs out of Ohio. "The Ohio Contractors Association and other backers of a ban say such quotas often make it harder for contractors to hire the best people... [Opponents of the bill] say the rules help keep money in the local economy and ensure that tax money goes to Ohio workers." In the end, the bill passed by just a 5 votes, making it one of the most closely contested proposals of the year.

=== Gun control ===
On November 17, 2015, Arndt voted in favor of "legislation that would allow concealed handguns to be taken into day-care centers, public buildings, airports outside security checkpoints, and publicly accessible areas of police stations... House Bill 48 passed 63-25 over vocal Democratic objections that no opponents of the bill were allowed to give floor speeches before House Speaker Cliff Rosenberger, a Clinton County Republican, called for a vote. Even without the speeches, though, there was little doubt that the measure would pass the GOP-dominated House once it was called to the floor."
