= Don Leonard (politician) =

American politician

Member-elect of the U.S. House of Representatives from Ohio's 15th district
- Assuming office January 3, 2027
- Succeeding: Mike Carey

Personal details
- Born: Don Ralph Leonard; 1977 or 1978 (age 48–49)
- Party: Democratic
- Children: 1
- Education: University of Massachusetts, Lowell (BA, MA); Cornell University (MA, PhD)

Don Ralph Leonard (born 1977 or 1978) is an American political scientist and politician. A member of the Democratic Party, he is the representative-elect for Ohio's 15th congressional district in the United States House of Representatives, being elected in the 2026 election.

== Early life and career ==
Leonard grew up in Alaska. He was raised by a single mother; his family struggled with poverty and homelessness.

He graduated from the University of Massachusetts, Lowell with a bachelor's in political science in 2002 and a master's in regional economic and social development in 2004. He spent two years with the Peace Corps in Bolivia from 2004 to 2006. Following his volunteer service, Leonard earned master's and doctoral degrees in government from Cornell University in 2011 and 2014 respectively, focusing on Latin American comparative politics and international relations.

Leonard held postdoctoral fellowships at Princeton University from 2013 to 2014 and Tulane University from 2014 to 2016. He joined Ohio State University in 2016 as a professional practice assistant professor of city and regional planning. He resigned in January 2026 to campaign for Congress full-time.

== U.S. House of Representatives ==
Leonard was the Democratic nominee in the 2026 15th congressional district election. His campaign emphasized the affordability of child care, health care, housing, and aging.

On March 28, 2026, Leonard was arrested while participating in a No Kings protest in Grove City, Ohio. Police cited him for violating a noise ordinance after he used a megaphone and charged him with obstructing official business after he refused an instruction to move toward police vehicles. In an October interview with WOSU-FM, Leonard said the charges had subsequently been dropped.

In the May 5 Democratic primary, Leonard defeated former state Representative Adam Miller with 52.9 percent of the vote. Leonard faced Republican incumbent Mike Carey and Libertarian Brennan Barrington in the November 3 general election. The Associated Press projected Leonard's victory that evening. The Cook Political Report had rated the race as leaning Republican before the election.

== Political positions ==
Leonard's political views have been categorized as progressive. He supports a "Medicare for all who want it" public health insurance option and universal child care.

Leonard criticized data center development for imposing higher electricity costs and environmental risks on local communities. He described the facilities as "the mascot for predatory capitalism," connecting opposition to their expansion with broader concerns about corporate power and economic insecurity.

In March 2026, Leonard supported ending U.S. weapons exports to Israel and reassessing Israel–United States relations. He characterized Israel's military operations in Gaza as genocidal and pledged not to accept donations from AIPAC.

== Personal life ==
Leonard lives in the Westgate neighborhood in Columbus, Ohio with his wife and daughter.

U.S. House of Representatives
Preceded by Mike Carey	Member of the U.S. House of Representatives from Ohio's 15th congressional district Taking office 2027	Elect
