= D. J. Swearingen =

American politician (born 1987)

D.J. Swearingen

Member of the Ohio House of Representatives from the 89th district
- In office August 1, 2019 – October 4, 2026
- Preceded by: Steve Arndt
- Succeeded by: Caleb Stidham

Personal details
- Born: April 27, 1987 (age 39)
- Party: Republican
- Education: Bowling Green State University (BA); University of Dayton (JD)

Douglas "D.J." Swearingen Jr. (born April 27, 1987) is an American politician who served in the Ohio House of Representatives representing the 89th district from 2019 to 2026. A Republican, Swearingen represented the counties of Ottawa and Erie.

== Biography ==
A graduate of Bowling Green State University, Swearingen went on to earn his Juris Doctor degree from the University of Dayton School of Law. A practicing attorney, Swearingen focused on real estate and business matters. Previously, Swearingen served as Chair of the Erie County Republican Party.

In 2019, Representative Steve Arndt announced his retirement and his desire to resign prior to the expiration of his term. As a result, Swearingen was chosen by Ohio House Republicans to succeed Arndt. He was sworn into office on August 1, 2019.

In the 135th General Assembly, Swearingen introduced a bill to mandate E-Verify usage by all corporations in Ohio. This bill was passed by the Ohio House but died in the Ohio Senate’s General Government Committee. Swearingen reintroduced a similar bill in the 136th General Assembly which limited mandatory E-Verify usage to construction contractors.

In the 136th General Assembly, Swearingen introduced a resolution to impeach Hamilton County Judge Ted Berry for inflammatory comments following the assassination of Charlie Kirk.

Swearingen resigned from the Ohio House of Representatives in October 2026, after being appointed to a position in the United States Department of Justice.

=== Committee assignments ===
As of June 2026, Swearingen serves on the following committees in the Ohio House.

- Judiciary (vice chair)
- Arts, Athletics, and Tourism
- Community Revitalization
- Public Insurance and Pensions
- Redistricting

== Links ==
- Representative D.J. Swearingen (official site)
