= Ohio Conference of Teamsters =

- Abbreviation: OCT
- Founded: 1946
- Type: Trade union conference
- Headquarters: Akron, Ohio United States
- Location: Ohio
- President: Patrick J. Darrow
- Parent organization: International Brotherhood of Teamsters

The Ohio Conference of Teamsters is a statewide organization that unites various local unions affiliated with the International Brotherhood of Teamsters in Ohio.

== History ==
The Ohio Conference of Teamsters was founded in 1946 as a regional body within the International Brotherhood of Teamsters. In 1952 when William Presser became president, the Ohio Conference of Teamsters saw rapid growth in membership from about 23,000 to over 100,000 by 1981. During the 1970s and 1980s under Jackie Presser's leadership who succeeded his father in major roles including the conference presidency, the Ohio Conference of Teamsters faced intense federal investigations into financial irregularities and executive pay.

== Structure and leadership ==
The Ohio Conference of Teamsters serves as a coordinating entity for its affiliated local unions across Ohio in sectors like transportation, construction, and manufacturing. Current leadership features Patrick J. Darrow as president, who also holds positions in related Teamsters entities and community boards, directing the conference for approximately 50,000 workers in the state. The structure includes trustees and representatives from various locals, such as those in Toledo and Cleveland.

== Activities ==
The Ohio Conference of Teamsters engages in a variety of activities to support its member locals, including organizing new workers into the union, assisting with contract negotiations, and providing training programs. During labor disputes, the conference coordinates support for strikes. Additionally, the organization manages or oversees benefit funds, including health and welfare programs that offer medical, dental, and vision coverage to eligible members.

== Political involvement ==
The Ohio Conference of Teamsters has a long history of political engagement, often endorsing candidates who support pro-labor policies. In the 2026 gubernatorial race, the conference endorsed Republican candidate Vivek Ramaswamy, marking a departure from its traditional support for Democratic candidates.

== See also ==
- International Brotherhood of Teamsters
- Labor unions in the United States
