= David Taylor (Ohio politician) =

American politician (born 1969)

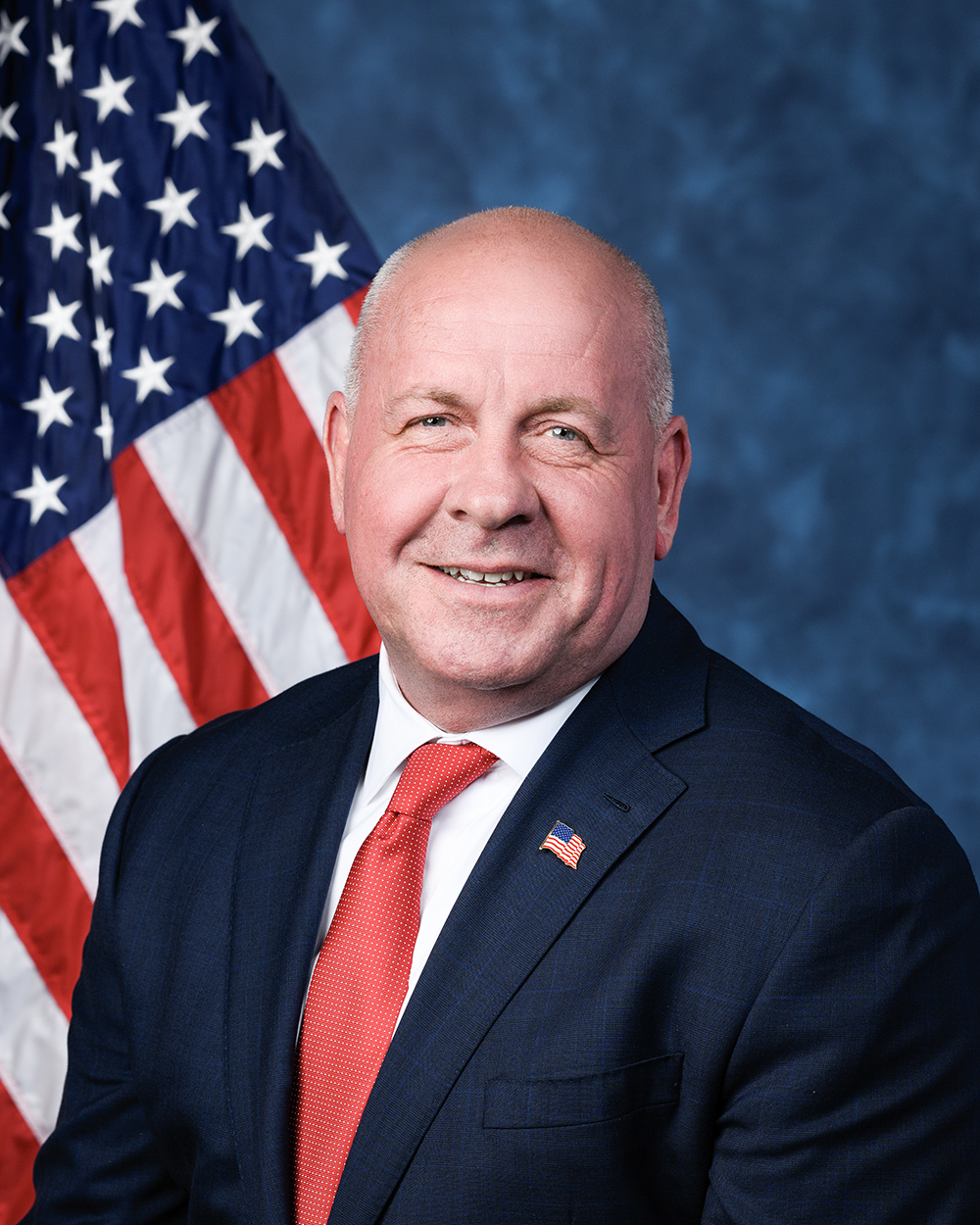
- Official portrait, 2024

Member of the U.S. House of Representatives from Ohio's 2nd district
- Incumbent
- Assumed office January 3, 2025
- Preceded by: Brad Wenstrup

Personal details
- Born: David James Taylor; November 16, 1969 (age 56) Ohio, U.S.
- Party: Republican
- Spouse: Charity Taylor (m. 1997)
- Children: 3
- Education: Miami University (BA); University of Dayton (JD)
- Website: House website Campaign website

David James Taylor (born November 16, 1969) is an American politician and business owner serving as the U.S. representative for Ohio's 2nd congressional district since 2025.

== Early life and career ==
Taylor was born in Ohio and graduated from Amelia High School in Amelia, Ohio. He earned a Bachelor of Arts degree from Miami University in 1992 and a Juris Doctor from the University of Dayton School of Law in 1996. At Miami, Taylor was a member of the Delta Upsilon fraternity. He worked as a part-time assistant prosecutor for Clermont County before taking over as the owner of his family's concrete business, Sardinia Ready Mix, in Brown County.

== U.S. House of Representatives ==
=== Elections ===
==== 2024 ====
Following incumbent representative Brad Wenstrup's announcement that he would not seek re-election to the United States House of Representatives for Ohio's 2nd congressional district in the 2024 United States House of Representatives elections, Taylor announced his candidacy. He won the Republican Party nomination and defeated Democratic nominee Samantha Meadows in the November general election.

=== Tenure ===
Taylor was sworn in to the 119th United States Congress on January 3, 2025.

==== Swastika incident ====
On October 15, 2025, a social media post garnered attention for depicting a staffer for Taylor, Angelo Elia, on a Zoom call from Taylor's suite in the Cannon House Office Building with an American flag altered to include a swastika visible in the background. Taylor's office reported that on October 14, the flag had been discovered in the suite. Taylor stated that his office and the United States Capitol Police immediately began a coordinated investigation of the incident. Taylor released a statement a day after the report, concluding his "full scale investigation" by stating "no employee of this office would knowingly display such a despicable image, and the flag in question was taken down immediately upon the discovery of the obscured symbol it bore." According to Taylor and two other Republican sources, multiple other GOP offices also received the mailed flag as early as January. Staffers from other offices stated the swastika was clearly visible to the naked eye, and that they had disposed of the flags upon receiving them, disputing Taylor's claim the swastika was an "optical illusion."

=== Committee assignments ===
For the 119th Congress:

- Committee on Agriculture
  - Subcommittee on Commodity Markets, Digital Assets, and Rural Development
- Committee on Transportation and Infrastructure
  - Subcommittee on Highways and Transit
  - Subcommittee on Railroads, Pipelines, and Hazardous Materials
  - Subcommittee on Water Resources and Environment (Vice Chair)

=== Caucus memberships ===
- Republican Study Committee

== Personal life ==
Taylor and his wife, Charity, reside in Clermont County with their three daughters.

== Electoral history ==
Ohio's 2nd Congressional District Republican primary results (2024)
Party	Candidate	Votes	%
Republican	David Taylor	26,247	25.5
Republican	Tim O'Hara	22,626	22.0
Republican	Larry Kidd	19,583	19.0
Republican	Shane Wilkin	9,932	9.6
Republican	Ron Hood	9,020	8.8
Republican	Phil Heimlich	5,080	4.9
Republican	Tom Hwang	3,202	3.1
Republican	Kim Georgeton	2,311	2.2
Republican	Charles Tassell	1,737	1.7
Republican	Niraj Antani	1,700	1.7
Republican	Derek Myers	1,565	1.5
Total votes		103,003	100.0

Ohio's 2nd congressional district (2024)
Party	Candidate	Votes	%
Republican	David Taylor	262,843	73.5
Democratic	Samantha Meadows	94,751	26.5
Total votes		357,954	100.0
Republican hold			

U.S. House of Representatives
Preceded by Brad Wenstrup	Member of the U.S. House of Representatives from Ohio's 2nd congressional district 2025–present	Incumbent
U.S. order of precedence (ceremonial)
Preceded by Suhas Subramanyam	United States representatives by seniority 419th	Succeeded by Derek Tran
