= 2026 Ohio gubernatorial election =

- November 3, 2026
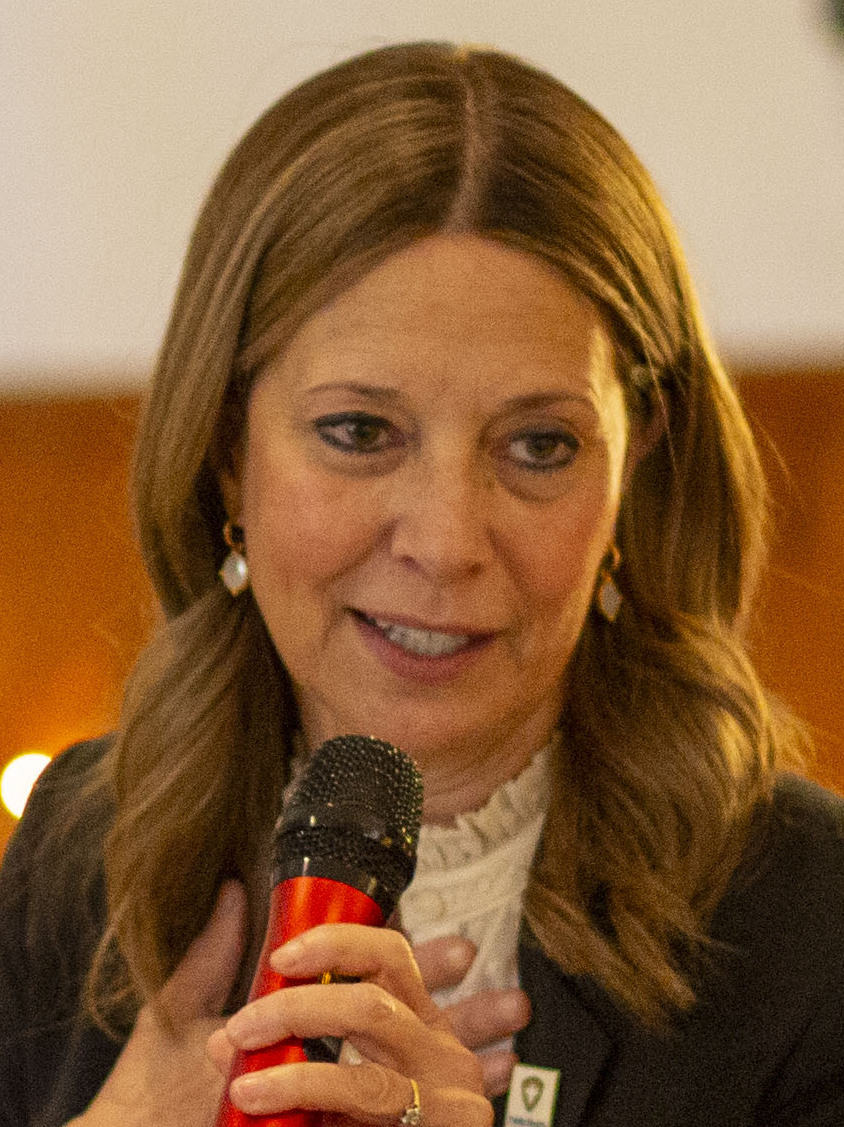

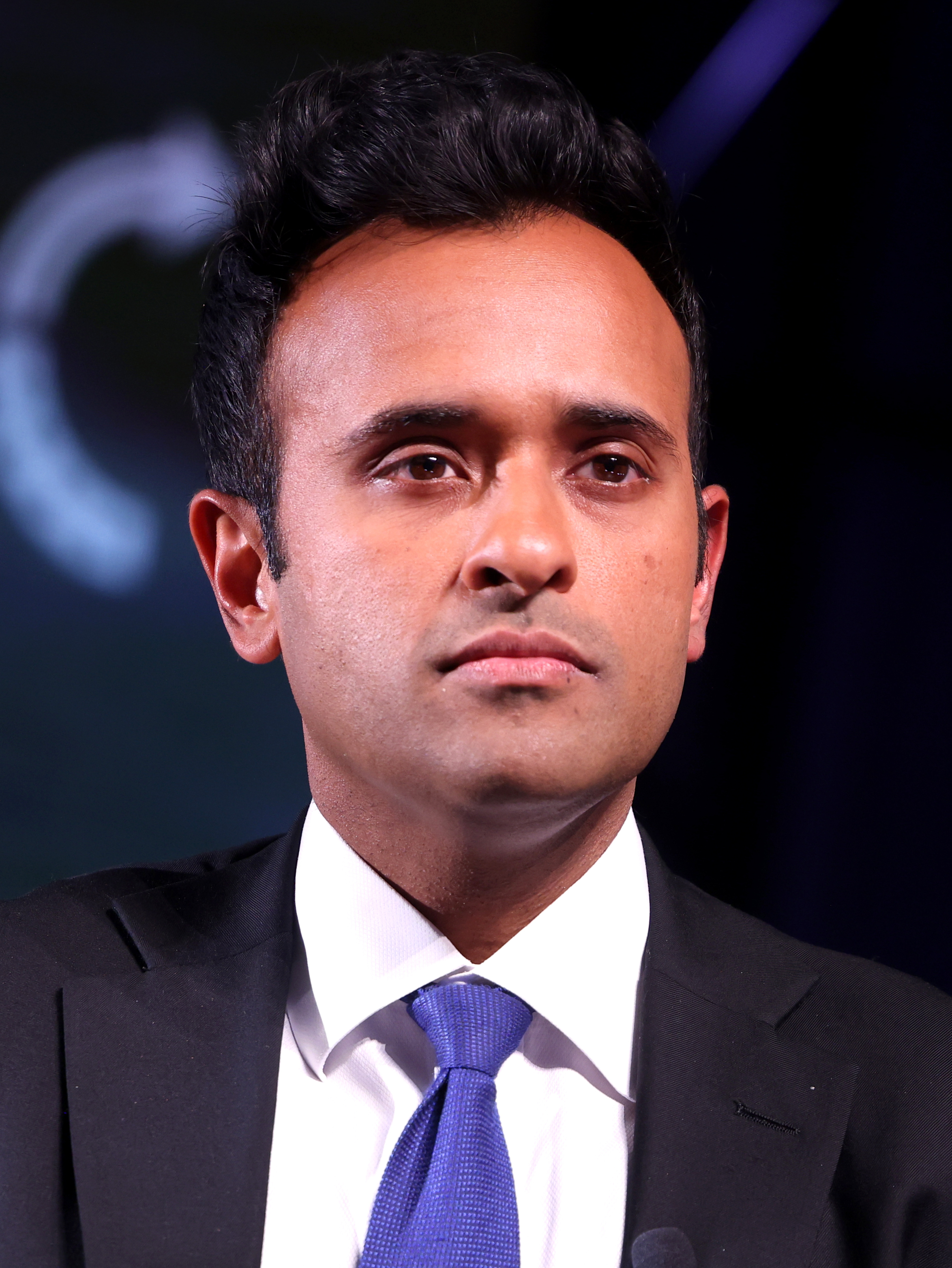
Nominee	Amy Acton	Vivek Ramaswamy
Party	Democratic	Republican
Running mate	David Pepper	Rob McColley
Popular vote	2,427,432	2,051,557
Percentage	52.41%	44.29%
- Acton: 40–50% 50–60% 60–70% 70–80% Ramaswamy: 40–50% 50–60% 60–70% 70–80%
Governor before election
Mike DeWine
Republican
Elected Governor
Amy Acton
Democratic

The 2026 Ohio gubernatorial election was held on November 3, 2026, to elect the governor of Ohio. Former state health director Amy Acton defeated Republican entrepreneur Vivek Ramaswamy. Republican incumbent governor Mike DeWine was ineligible to seek a third consecutive term.

Primary elections were held on May 5, with Ramaswamy defeating minimal opposition for the Republican nomination and Acton running unopposed for the Democratic nomination. Acton will be Ohio's first elected female (Note: Nancy Hollister served as governor, albeit for only 11 days, following George Voinovich's resignation to take his seat in the U.S. Senate.) and first Jewish governor. If he had been elected, Ramaswamy would have become the first Indian American governor of Ohio and the first Hindu governor in the United States. (Note: Bobby Jindal was born Hindu but converted to Christianity as a teenager.)

The campaign was described as "ugly" and heavily reliant on negative campaigning. Ramaswamy directly attacked Acton's background, questioning her mental fitness for office by making claims that the childhood abuse she faced was exaggerated. Ramaswamy also faced harsh criticism for his false attack ads featuring Acton's estranged mother. Acton, meanwhile, labeled Ramaswamy an "out-of-touch plutocrat" and "con artist."

Polls throughout most of the campaign indicated a competitive race, with Acton holding a small advantage. However, following the release of the widely condemned ad of Acton's mother, Ramaswamy fell behind further in the polls, causing many news organizations to predict a Democratic flip. These predictions were proven correct, as Acton won the election by a comfortable eight-point margin. This is the first time Democrats have won a gubernatorial election in Ohio since 2006. Acton will be inaugurated on January 11, 2027.

== Republican primary ==
=== Candidates ===
==== Nominee ====
- Vivek Ramaswamy, founder of Roivant Sciences and candidate for president in 2024
  - Running mate: Rob McColley, president of the Ohio Senate (2025–present) from the 1st district (2017–present)

==== Eliminated in primary ====
- Casey Putsch, automotive entrepreneur
  - Running mate: Kim Georgeton, Warren County central committee member

==== Disqualified ====
- Heather Hill, business owner, and former president of the Morgan County School Board
  - Running mate: Stuart Moats, business owner and reality TV star

==== Not on ballot ====
- Renea Turner
  - Running mate: Jalen Turner

==== Withdrawn ====
- Matt Mayer, former director of the Buckeye Institute
- Robert Sprague, Ohio state treasurer (2019–present) (endorsed Ramaswamy, ran for secretary of state)
- Dave Yost, Ohio attorney general (2019–2026) and former Ohio state auditor (2011–2019)

==== Declined ====
- Warren Davidson, U.S. representative from Ohio's 8th congressional district (2016–present) (endorsed Ramaswamy, ran successfully for re-election)
- Jon Husted, U.S. senator (2025–present), former lieutenant governor (2019–2025), and candidate for governor in 2018 (endorsed Ramaswamy, ran for U.S. Senate)
- Frank LaRose, Ohio secretary of state (2019–present) and candidate for U.S. Senate in 2024 (endorsed Ramaswamy, ran successfully for state auditor)
- Jim Tressel, lieutenant governor of Ohio (2025–present)

=== Endorsements ===
Casey Putsch

Organizations

- Anti-Zionist America PAC
Vivek Ramaswamy

Executive branch officials

- Elon Musk, former senior advisor to the president (2025) (Independent)
- Donald Trump, president of the United States (2017–2021, 2025–present)
- JD Vance, vice president of the United States (2025–present)

U.S. senators

- Marsha Blackburn, Tennessee (2019–present)
- Jon Husted, Ohio (2025–present)
- Mike Lee, Utah (2011–present)
- Cynthia Lummis, Wyoming (2021–present)
- Bernie Moreno, Ohio (2025–present)
- Rob Portman, former Ohio (2011–2023)
- Rick Scott, Florida (2019–present)

U.S. representatives

- Warren Davidson, OH-08 (2016–present)
- Jim Jordan, OH-04 (2007–present)
- Greg Lopez, former CO-04 (2024–2025) (Independent) (Note: Lopez was a Republican throughout his tenure in Congress and at the time of his endorsement. He left the party in 2026.)
- Max Miller, OH-07 (2023–present)
- Michael Rulli, OH-06 (2024–present)
- David Taylor, OH-02 (2025–present)
- Brad Wenstrup, former OH-02 (2013–2025)

Statewide officials

- Mike DeWine, governor of Ohio (2019–present) (previously declined to endorse)
- Patrick F. Fischer, justice of the Ohio Supreme Court (2017–present)
- Frank LaRose, secretary of state of Ohio (2019–present)
- Robert Sprague, state treasurer of Ohio (2019–present)
- Bob Taft, former governor of Ohio (1999–2007)

State legislators

- Theresa Gavarone, majority leader of the Ohio Senate (2025–present) from the 2nd district (2019–present)
- Matt Huffman, speaker of the Ohio House of Representatives (2025–present) from the 78th district (2025–present)
- Rob McColley, president of the Ohio senate (2025–present) from the 1st district (2017–present)
- Bill Reineke, president pro tempore of the Ohio Senate (2025–present) from the 26th district (2021–present)
- 12 other current state senators (Note: Andrew Brenner, state senator from the 19th district (2019–present); Brian Chavez, state senator from the 30th district (2023–present); Jerry Cirino, state senator from the 18th district (2021–present); Steve Huffman, state senator from the 5th district (2019–present); Terry Johnson, state senator from the 14th district (2019–present); George Lang, state senator from the 4th district (2021–present); Susan Manchester, state senator from the 12th district (2025–present); Sandra O'Brien, state senator from the 32nd district (2021–present); Michele Reynolds, state senator from the 3rd district (2023–present); Kristina Roegner, state senator from the 27th district (2019–present); Jane Timken, state senator from the 29th district (2025–present); Shane Wilkin, state senator from the 17th district (2023–present))
- 7 other current state representatives (Note: Rodney Creech, state representative from the 40th district (2023–present); Kellie Deeter, state representative from the 54th district (2024–present); Ron Ferguson, state representative from the 96th district (2021–present); Tex Fischer, state representative from the 59th district (2024–present); Adam Mathews, state representative from the 56th district (2023–present); Nick Santucci, state representative from the 64th district (2023–present); Josh Williams, state representative from the 44th district (2023–present))

Local officials

- 65 Ohio county sheriffs
- Matt Miller, mayor of Ashland, Ohio
- Christopher Smitherman, former vice mayor of Cincinnati (2018–2022) (Independent)

Party branches

- Columbiana County Republican Party
- Pickaway County Republican Party
- Warren County Republican Party

Party officials

- Alex Triantafilou, chairman of the Ohio Republican Party (2023–present)

Individuals

- Steve Hilton, former Fox News host and candidate in the 2026 California gubernatorial election
- Charlie Kirk, co-founder of Turning Point USA (deceased)
- Anthony Muñoz, former professional football player
- Jake Paul, professional boxer and YouTuber
- Donald Trump Jr., businessman and son of president Donald Trump

Political parties

- Ohio Republican Party

Organizations

- Armenian National Committee of America
- Buckeye Firearms Association
- Construction Employers Association
- NRA Political Victory Fund
- Ohio Chamber of Commerce
- Ohio Real Estate Investors Association
- Ohio Right to Life
- Right to Life Action Coalition of Ohio
- Veterans for America First

Labor unions

- Central Midwest Regional Council of Carpenters
- Cleveland Building and Construction Trades Council
- International Union of Operating Engineers Local 18
- Ohio Conference of Teamsters
- Ohio Laborers' District Council
- Ohio State Association of Plumbers and Pipefitters
Dave Yost (withdrawn)

Statewide officials

- Ken Blackwell, former Ohio secretary of state (1999–2007)

Local officials

- 30 county sheriffs
Declined to endorse

Statewide officials

- ~~Mike DeWine, governor of Ohio (2019–present)~~ (later endorsed Ramaswamy)
- Dave Yost, attorney general of Ohio (2019–2026)

=== Polling ===
Poll source	Date(s) administered	Sample size (Note: Key: A – all adults RV – registered voters LV – likely voters V – unclear)	Margin of error	Heather Hill	Casey Putsch	Vivek Ramaswamy	Dave Yost	Other	Undecided
	April 25, 2026	Hill gets disqualified							
Bowling Green State University/YouGov	April 7–14, 2026	383 (LV)	–	12%	12%	76%	–		
	December 16, 2025	Putsch declares his candidacy							
Bowling Green State University/YouGov	October 2–14, 2025	287 (RV)	–	18%	–	76%	–	6% (Note: "Someone else" with 6%)	–
	May 16, 2025	Yost withdraws his candidacy							
Bowling Green State University/YouGov	April 18–24, 2025	359 (RV)	–	4%	–	64%	13%	19% (Note: Jim Tressel with 14%)	–
Fabrizio, Lee & Associates (R)	April 6–10, 2025	500 (LV)	± 4.4%	1%	–	71%	10%	11% (Note: Jim Tressel with 11%)	8%
Fabrizio, Lee & Associates (R)	April 6–10, 2025	500 (LV)	± 4.4%	–	–	75%	19%	–	6%
Fabrizio, Lee & Associates (R)	April 6–10, 2025	500 (LV)	± 4.4%	–	–	77%	–	17% (Note: Jim Tressel with 17%)	6%
	February 25, 2025	Ramaswamy declares his candidacy							
Bowling Green State University/YouGov	February 14–21, 2025	800 (RV)	± 4.0%	9%	–	61%	24%	–	9%
National Public Affairs (R) (Note: Poll sponsored by Yost's campaign)	February 2–5, 2025	602 (RV)	± 4.0%	–	–	46%	18%	2% (Note: Robert Sprague and Jeremiah Workman with 1%)	34%
WPA Intelligence (R) (Note: Poll sponsored by Club for Growth)	January 28–30, 2025	600 (LV)	± 4.0%	–	–	57%	26%	6% (Note: Robert Sprague with 6%)	10%
Fabrizio, Lee & Associates (R) (Note: Poll sponsored by Ramaswamy's campaign)	January 26–27, 2025	600 (LV)	± 4.0%	–	–	52%	18%	3% (Note: Robert Sprague with 2%; Jeremiah Workman with 1%)	27%

=== Results ===
Primary results by county: Ramaswamy: 60–70%; 70–80%; 80–90%

Republican primary
Party	Candidate	Votes	%
Republican	Vivek Ramaswamy; Rob McColley	676,562	82.4
Republican	Casey Putsch; Kim Georgeton	144,184	17.6
Total votes		820,746	100.0

== Democratic primary ==
=== Candidates ===
==== Nominee ====
- Amy Acton, former director of the Ohio Department of Health (2019–2020)
  - Running mate: David Pepper, former chair of the Ohio Democratic Party (2015–2020), former Hamilton County commissioner (2007–2011), nominee for state auditor in 2010, and nominee for attorney general in 2014

==== Withdrawn ====
- Jacob Chiara (endorsed Acton)

==== Declined ====
- Sherrod Brown, former U.S. senator (2007–2025) (ran successfully for U.S. Senate, endorsed Acton)
- Shontel Brown, U.S. representative from Ohio's 11th congressional district (2021–present) (ran successfully for re-election)
- Greg Landsman, U.S. representative from Ohio's 1st congressional district (2023–present) (ran successfully for re-election)
- Allison Russo, former minority leader of the Ohio House of Representatives (2022–2025) and nominee for Ohio's 15th congressional district in the 2021 special election (ran successfully for secretary of state)
- Tim Ryan, former U.S. representative (2003–2023), nominee for U.S. Senate in 2022, and candidate for president in 2020
- Emilia Sykes, U.S. representative from Ohio's 13th congressional district (2023–present) (ran successfully for re-election)

=== Endorsements ===
Amy Acton

Executive branch officials

- John Patterson, former state executive director of the Farm Service Agency (2022–2025)

U.S. senators

- Sherrod Brown, former Ohio (2007–2025) and Democratic nominee for U.S. Senate in 2026

U.S. representatives

- Ed Feighan, former OH-19 (1983–1993)
- Mary Jo Kilroy, former OH-15 (2009–2011)

Statewide officials

- Dick Celeste, former governor of Ohio (1983–1991)
- Teresa Fedor, member of the Ohio State Board of Education from the 2nd district (2023–present)
- Jim Petro, former attorney general of Ohio (2003–2007) (Republican)
- Ted Strickland, former governor of Ohio (2007–2011)

State legislators

- 7 current and former state senators
- Munira Abdullahi, HD-09 (2023–present)
- Rachel Baker, HD-27 (2023–present)
- Crystal Lett, HD-11 (2025–present)
- 13 other state representatives
- 3 former state representatives

Local officials

- Justin Bibb, mayor of Cleveland (2022–present)
- Andrew Ginther, mayor of Columbus (2016–present)
- Wade Kapszukiewicz, mayor of Toledo (2018–present)
- Aftab Pureval, mayor of Cincinnati (2022–present)
- Nan Whaley, former mayor of Dayton (2014–2022) and Democratic nominee in the 2022 Ohio gubernatorial election

Party officials

- Jaime Harrison, former chair of the Democratic National Committee (2021–2025)

Individuals

- Ed O'Neill, actor
- Connie Schultz, columnist and wife of Sherrod Brown

Political parties

- Ohio Democratic Party

Labor unions

- AFL-CIO Ohio
- American Federation of Government Employees
- American Nurses Association Ohio
- American Federation of State, County and Municipal Employees
- Communications Workers of America
- International Union of Painters and Allied Trades
- Ohio Education Association
- Ohio Federation of Teachers
- Service Employees International Union
- United Auto Workers
- United Mine Workers of America
- United Steelworkers

Organizations

- 314 Action
- College Democrats of America
- EMILYs List
- End Citizens United

=== Polling ===
Hypothetical polling

Poll source	Date(s) administered	Sample size	Margin of error	Amy Acton	Sherrod Brown	Tim Ryan	Other	Undecided
	November 22, 2025	Tim Ryan declines to run for governor						
Bowling Green State University/YouGov	October 2–14, 2025	377 (RV)	–	50%	–	41%	8% (Note: "Someone else" with 8%)	–
	August 18, 2025	Sherrod Brown announces his candidacy for the U.S. Senate						
Bowling Green State University/YouGov	April 18–24, 2025	335 (RV)	–	20%	59%	16%	14% (Note: "Neither" with 14%)	–
Bowling Green State University/YouGov	April 18–24, 2025	335 (RV)	–	52%	–	38%	10% (Note: "Someone else" with 10%)	–
Bowling Green State University/YouGov	February 14–21, 2025	335 (RV)	± 4.0%	20%	59%	17%	–	4%
Bowling Green State University/YouGov	February 14–21, 2025	335 (RV)	± 4.0%	46%	–	45%	–	9%

=== Results ===
Democratic primary
Party	Candidate	Votes	%
Democratic	Amy Acton; David Pepper	767,360	100.0
Total votes		767,360	100.0

== Libertarian primary ==
=== Candidates ===
==== Nominee ====
- Don Kissick, television station operator, nominee for Ohio's 5th congressional district in 2018, and nominee for U.S. Senate in 2024
  - Running mate: James Mills

==== Eliminated in primary ====
- Travis Jon Vought (write-in)
  - Running mate: Christy Jo Orr

=== Results ===
Libertarian primary
Party	Candidate	Votes	%
Libertarian	Don Kissick; James Mills	8,705	97.8
Libertarian	Travis Jon Vought; Christy Jo Orr; (write-in)	180	2.2
Total votes		8,885	100.0

== Independent and other party candidates ==
=== Write-in candidates ===
==== Declared ====
- Timothy Grady, write-in candidate for governor in 2022
  - Andrea Neutz
- Heather Hill, business owner, former president of the Morgan County School Board, and Republican primary candidate for governor in 2026
  - Patrick Manley
- Renea Turner, Republican primary candidate for governor in 2026
  - Jalen Turner, Republican primary candidate for lieutenant governor in 2026
- Ron Ula
  - Michael C. Lehnerd

== General election ==
=== Campaign ===
On September 2, Ramaswamy accepted invitations to participate in gubernatorial debates hosted by CNN and WLWT and called on Acton to join him. Acton's campaign subsequently declined, citing what it characterized as inaccurate and personal attacks in Ramaswamy's campaign advertising. As a result, no debates between the two major-party nominees were held.

==== Canfield Fair incident ====
On September 6, Acton was attacked at a campaign event at the Canfield Fair. An armed individual lunged at her and was apprehended by local authorities. Several campaign volunteers suffered minor injuries. The suspect, Patrick Havas, was charged with "two counts of assault and one count of disorderly conduct."

==== Gas tax holiday ====
On September 21, Acton called for an emergency gas tax holiday to provide relief to Ohioans amid rising fuel prices. Ramaswamy subsequently proposed suspending Ohio's gasoline and diesel taxes for 90 days, working with Republican legislative leaders to advance the measure. On September 30, the Ohio General Assembly passed House Bill 519, which temporarily suspended the state's gasoline and diesel taxes for 90 days, with $725 million in state general revenue funds allocated to replace the lost revenue. Governor Mike DeWine signed the bill into law on October 1, with the tax holiday taking effect on October 4.

==== Attacks on Amy Acton's upbringing and ad controversy ====
The Ramaswamy campaign was described as "ugly" and heavily focused upon negative campaigning.

An attack ad by the Ramaswamy campaign focused on Acton's background to portray her as dishonest and mentally ill, claiming that she had "lied" and "exaggerated" about being abused, despite evidence that she had undergone childhood rape, other types of sexual abuse, homelessness, poverty, and parental neglect. The ad – which featured Acton's mother, Donna Arthur, denouncing her – received nationwide attention after it was publicized on social media on October 19. Acton has been estranged from Arthur since she was removed from the family home at the age of 12 after her stepfather was charged with raping her. Acton's brother said the two were removed from their mother's custody after their stepfather was indicted for raping Acton as a child. Acton has not seen Arthur since. Her mother's husband was indicted but failed to reappear for trial and has since died.

The advertisement was first publicized by Ohio political blogger D.J. Byrnes, who writes under the pseudonym The Rooster. Byrnes had learned that the campaign was developing an advertisement featuring Acton's mother and subsequently obtained a recording of it through a political message-testing survey conducted by the polling firm Dynata.

Connie Luck, a spokesperson for Ramaswamy's campaign, took credit for creating it and said the ad will "air both online and on TV in the closing days of the campaign". On October 21, 2026, the Ramaswamy campaign said it would spend $4 million to broadcast the ad despite widespread bipartisan condemnation. Ohio Republicans, including Senator Jon Husted and Secretary of State Frank LaRose, publicly criticized the ad, and Governor Mike DeWine also called for it to be pulled. President Trump and Vice President Vance expressed support for the ad, encouraging Ramaswamy to keep running it, and criticized DeWine for his opposition.

The editorial board of the Cleveland newspaper The Plain Dealer reversed its policy of not endorsing candidates for governor to endorse Acton because of the ad. The board wrote the ad "reveals a failure of judgment that Ohio cannot afford in its governor".

Ramaswamy's campaign stopped airing the ad in late October, after $1 million had been spent on the campaign, according to AdImpact.

=== Predictions ===
Source	Ranking	As of
The Cook Political Report	Lean D (flip)	October 29, 2026
Decision Desk HQ	Lean D (flip)	November 3, 2026
Fox News	Lean D (flip)	November 1, 2026
Inside Elections	Tilt D (flip)	October 29, 2026
NBC News	Lean D (flip)	November 3, 2026
RealClearPolitics	Tossup	November 1, 2026
Sabato's Crystal Ball	Lean D (flip)	November 2, 2026
Silver Bulletin	Likely D (flip)	November 3, 2026

=== Post-primary endorsements ===
Vivek Ramaswamy (R)

Statewide officials

- Ken Blackwell, former Ohio secretary of state (1999–2007) and 2006 Republican gubernatorial nominee

Labor unions

- Fraternal Order of Police of Ohio

Organizations

- National Federation of Independent Business in Ohio
- Susan B. Anthony Pro-Life America
- College Republicans of America
Amy Acton (D)

Executive branch officials

- Pete Buttigieg, former secretary of transportation (2021–2025)
- Barack Obama, former president of the United States (2009–2017)

Statewide officials

- Andy Beshear, governor of Kentucky (2019-present)
- Mikie Sherrill, governor of New Jersey (2026–present)

U.S. representatives

- Johnny Olszewski, MD-02 (2025–present)

Individuals

- Nick Fuentes, far-right political commentator
- John Legend, singer
- MK Pritzker, First Lady of Illinois (2019–present)
- Casey Putsch, automotive entrepreneur and 2026 Republican gubernatorial primary candidate (Republican)
- Olivia Rodrigo, singer

Labor unions

- Amalgamated Transit Union
- Bricklayers and Allied Craftworkers Local 23
- Ohio Association of Professional Fire Fighters
- Ohio Patrolmen's Benevolent Association
- Upper Ohio Valley Building and Construction Trades Council

Organizations

- Boston University College Republicans

Newspapers

- Akron Beacon Journal
- The Blade
- The Columbus Dispatch
- Ironton Tribune
- The Plain Dealer

=== Fundraising ===
Campaign finance reports as of October 14, 2026
Candidate	Raised	Spent
Vivek Ramaswamy (R)	$43,221,712	$79,486,459
Amy Acton (D)	$37,711,952	$34,046,961
Source: Ohio Secretary of State

=== Polling ===
Aggregate polls

Source of poll aggregation	Dates administered	Dates updated	Vivek Ramaswamy (R)	Amy Acton (D)	Other/Undecided (Note: Calculated by taking the difference of 100% and all other candidates combined.)	Margin
270toWin	October 16 – November 1, 2026	November 2, 2026	45.9%	49.6%	4.5%	Acton +3.7%
Decision Desk HQ	through November 1, 2026	November 2, 2026	45.2%	49.2%	5.6%	Acton +4.0%
FiftyPlusOne	through November 1, 2026	November 2, 2026	44.7%	48.9%	6.4%	Acton +4.2%
RealClearPolitics	October 9 – November 1, 2026	November 1, 2026	44.9%	49.6%	5.5%	Acton +4.7%
Silver Bulletin	through November 1, 2026	November 2, 2026	44.6%	48.7%	6.7%	Acton +4.1%
Average			45.1%	49.2%	5.7%	Acton +4.1%

Poll source	Date(s) administered	Sample size	Margin of error	Vivek Ramaswamy (R)	Amy Acton (D)	Other	Undecided
Emerson College (Note: Poll sponsored by Poll Vault, a Substack newsletter authored by Sean Trende.)	October 31 – November 1, 2026	930 (LV)	–	48%	48%	3% (Note: Don Kissick (L) with 3%)	1%
HarrisX	October 30 – November 1, 2026	496 (LV)	± 4.4%	47%	45%	4% (Note: "Another candidate" with 4%)	4%
Research Co.	October 30 – November 1, 2026	450 (LV)	± 4.6%	42%	48%	1% (Note: Don Kissick (L) with 1%)	9%
AtlasIntel	October 28 – November 1, 2026	1,801 (LV)	± 2.0%	44%	52%	4% (Note: Don Kissick (L) with 2%; "Other" and "Would not vote" with 1%)	0%
Survey 160	October 27 – November 1, 2026	1,122 (LV)	± 5.4%	44% (Note: With voters who lean towards a given candidate)	51%	4%	1%
Survey 160	October 27 – November 1, 2026	1,122 (LV)	± 5.4%	44%	50%	4%	2%
Survey 160	October 27 – November 1, 2026	1,159 (RV)	± 5.4%	43%	51%	4%	1%
Survey 160	October 27 – November 1, 2026	1,159 (RV)	± 5.4%	43%	51%	4%	3%
New York Times/Siena University	October 26 – November 1, 2026	717 (LV)	± 4.4%	43%	49%	0%	8%
ActiVote	October 16–31, 2026	400 (LV)	± 4.9%	49%	51%	—	—
InsiderAdvantage (R)	October 29–30, 2026	1,200 (LV)	± 2.8%	46%	49%	3%	2%
YouGov	October 26–29, 2026	2,090 (LV)	± 2.8%	46%	52%	2% (Note: "Someone else" with 1%; "I would not vote" with 1%)	0%
Suffolk University	October 21–26, 2026	500 (LV)	± 4.4%	44%	48%	3% (Note: Don Kissick (L) with 4%; "Refused" with 1%; "Write-in" with 0%)	3%
Concord Public Opinion Partners (D) (Note: Poll sponsored by Democrats for Education Reform)	October 22–24, 2026	496 (LV)	± 4.5%	39%	49%	8% (Note: Don Kissick (L) with 5%)	6%
	October 21, 2026	Ramaswamy campaign releases ad featuring Acton's estranged mother					
RedBox Research (D) (Note: Poll sponsored by A Fight Worth Having, a Democratic-aligned super PAC.)	October 20–23, 2026	2,998 (LV)	± 4.6%	44%	48%	3% (Note: Don Kissick (L) with 2%; "Someone else" with 2%; "Prefer not to answer" with 1%; "Did not vote in this race" with 0%)	3%
Echelon Insights (R) (Note: Poll conducted for NetChoice)	October 16–23, 2026	508 (LV)	± 5.2%	47%	45%	4% (Note: Don Kissick (L) with 4%)	3%
Verasight/VoteHub	October 1–20, 2026	531 (LV)	± 4.2%	45%	46%	2% (Note: Travis Kissick (L))	6%
Verasight/VoteHub	October 1–20, 2026	531 (LV)	± 4.2%	44%	44%	3% (Note: Travis Kissick (L))	—
Beacon Research (D)/ Shaw & Co. Research (R) (Note: Poll conducted for Fox News)	October 15–19, 2026	2,005 (RV)	± 2.0%	47%	51%	1% (Note: "Other" with 1%)	1%
Beacon Research (D)/ Shaw & Co. Research (R)	October 15–19, 2026	1,592 (LV)	± 2.0%	48%	50%	1%	1%
ActiVote	September 27 – October 19, 2026	400 (LV)	± 4.9%	51%	49%	—	—
Marist University	October 15–18, 2026	— (LV)	± 4.5%	43%	51%	3%	2%
Marist University	October 15–18, 2026	1,176 (RV)	± 3.9%	43%	50%	3%	3%
GS Strategy Group (R)/ New River Strategies (D) (Note: Poll sponsored by The Cook Political Report.)	October 9–13, 2026	959 (LV)	—	44%	49%	6% (Note: Kissick (L) with 6%)	1%
Bowling Green State University/YouGov	September 29 – October 9, 2026	1,000 (LV)	± 4.0%	44%	50%	6% (Note: Kissick (L) with 4%; "Someone else" with 2%)	—
co/efficient (R)	October 5–6, 2026	925 (LV)	± 3.5%	45%	43%	3% (Note: Don Kissick (L) with 3%)	8%
SSRS (Note: Poll conducted for CNN)	September 29 – October 5, 2026	760 (LV)	± 4.5%	42%	50%	8% (Note: "Neither" with 6%; "Other" with 2%)	1%
New York Times/Siena University	September 22 – October 1, 2026	616 (LV)	± 4.5%	45%	49%	—	6%
YouGov	September 18–30, 2026	3,780 (LV)	± 2.5%	44%	48%	1%	6%
Big Data Poll (R)	September 26–27, 2026	680 (LV)	± 4.0%	48%	47%	5%	—
Big Data Poll (R)	September 26–27, 2026	680 (LV)	± 4.0%	46%	44%	3%	7%
Big Data Poll (R)	September 26–27, 2026	735 (RV)	± 4.0%	47%	46%	7% (Note: Don Kissick (L) with 7%)	—
Big Data Poll (R)	September 26–27, 2026	735 (RV)	± 4.0%	45%	43%	4% (Note: Don Kissick (L) with 4%)	8%
Marist University	September 24–27, 2026	1,298 (RV)	± 3.8%	44%	50%	3%	3%
Suffolk University (Note: Poll sponsored by USA Today)	September 23–27, 2026	500 (LV)	± 4.4%	41%	50%	3% (Note: Don Kissick (L) with 3%; "Refused" and "Vote/Lean Write-in" with 0%)	6%
Bowling Green State University/YouGov	September 1–10, 2026	1,000 (LV)	± 4.0%	45%	48%	7% (Note: "Someone else" with 5%)	—
Concord Public Opinion Partners (D)	August 29–31, 2026	504 (LV)	± 4.4%	37%	49%	2% (Note: Don Kissick (L) with 2%)	12%
Beacon Research (D)/ Shaw & Co. Research (R)	August 6–10, 2026	1,008 (RV)	± 3.0%	50%	48%	—	2%
Tulchin Research (D) (Note: Poll conducted for John Kulewicz, Democratic candidate for Attorney General)	July 29 – August 4, 2026	600 (LV)	± 4.0%	44%	46%	5%	5%
New York Times/Siena University	June 15–28, 2026	601 (LV)	± 4.7%	47%	47%	—	6%
Fabrizio Ward (R)/ Impact Research (D) (Note: Poll conducted for AARP)	June 14–16, 2026	800 (LV)	± 3.5%	44%	47%	1%	9%
Tulchin Research (D)	June 2–4, 2026	600 (LV)	± 4.0%	44%	47%	—	9%
Beacon Research (D)/ Shaw & Co. Research (R)	May 28 – June 1, 2026	1,015 (RV)	± 3.0%	49%	50%	—	1%
	May 5, 2026	Primary elections are held					
Bowling Green State University/YouGov	April 7–14, 2026	1,000 (RV)	± 4.5%	48%	47%	5%	—
Echelon Insights (R) (Note: Poll sponsored by NetChoice)	April 3–9, 2026	413 (LV)	± 5.8%	49%	44%	—	7%
Quantus Insights (R)	March 13–14, 2026	809 (LV)	± 3.8%	45%	46%	3% (Note: "Some other candidate" with 3%)	6%
EMC Research (D) (Note: Polling commissioned by Ohio Environmental Council, an environmental organization)	February 10–22, 2026	1,343 (LV)	± 2.7%	43%	53%	—	4%
Emerson College	December 6–8, 2025	850 (RV)	± 3.3%	45%	46%	—	9%
Data Targeting (R) (Note: Poll sponsored by T. Roosevelt Action, a nonprofit organization committed to advocating for the rights of hunters and anglers across the United States.)	December 3–8, 2025	603 (LV)	± 4.0%	45%	43%	—	12%
Bowling Green State University/YouGov	October 2–14, 2025	800 (RV)	± 4.5%	50%	47%	3% (Note: "Someone else" with 3%)	—
Hart Research (D) (Note: Poll sponsored by the Ohio Federation of Teachers)	September 19–22, 2025	800 (LV)	± 3.0%	45%	46%	—	9%
Emerson College	August 18–19, 2025	1,000 (RV)	± 3.0%	49%	39%	—	12%
Impact Research (D) (Note: Poll sponsored by Acton's campaign)	July 24–28, 2025	800 (LV)	± 3.5%	47%	46%	—	7%
Bowling Green State University/YouGov	April 18–24, 2025	800 (RV)	± 4.1%	50%	45%	5%	—
	February 25, 2025	Ramaswamy declares his candidacy					
Public Policy Polling (D) (Note: Poll sponsored by 314 Action, an organization dedicated to electing Democratic scientists to public office.)	February 19–20, 2025	642 (RV)	± 3.9%	44%	45%	—	11%

Hypothetical polling

Vivek Ramaswamy vs. Tim Ryan

Poll source	Date(s) administered	Sample size	Margin of error	Vivek Ramaswamy (R)	Tim Ryan (D)	Other	Undecided
Bowling Green State University/YouGov	October 2–14, 2025	800 (RV)	± 4.5%	49%	47%	4% (Note: "Someone else" with 4%)	—
Emerson College	August 18–19, 2025	1,000 (RV)	± 3.0%	49%	41%	—	10%
Bowling Green State University/YouGov	April 18–24, 2025	800 (RV)	± 4.1%	51%	44%	5%	—
Public Policy Polling (D)	February 19–20, 2025	642 (RV)	± 3.9%	48%	42%	—	10%

Dave Yost vs. Amy Acton

Poll source	Date(s) administered	Sample size	Margin of error	Dave Yost (R)	Amy Acton (D)	Other	Undecided
Bowling Green State University/YouGov	April 18–24, 2025	800 (RV)	± 4.1%	46%	45%	9% (Note: "Someone else" with 9%)	—

Dave Yost vs. Tim Ryan

Poll source	Date(s) administered	Sample size	Margin of error	Dave Yost (R)	Tim Ryan (D)	Other	Undecided
Bowling Green State University/YouGov	April 18–24, 2025	800 (RV)	± 4.1%	46%	44%	10%	—

Jim Tressel vs. Amy Acton

Poll source	Date(s) administered	Sample size	Margin of error	Jim Tressel (R)	Amy Acton (D)	Other	Undecided
Bowling Green State University/YouGov	April 18–24, 2025	800 (RV)	± 4.1%	46%	44%	10%	—

Jim Tressel vs. Tim Ryan

Poll source	Date(s) administered	Sample size	Margin of error	Jim Tressel (R)	Tim Ryan (D)	Other	Undecided
Bowling Green State University/YouGov	April 18–24, 2025	800 (RV)	± 4.1%	46%	43%	11% (Note: "Someone else" with 11%)	—

=== Results ===
2026 Ohio gubernatorial election (est. 98% reporting)
Party	Candidate	Votes	%	±%
Democratic	Amy Acton; David Pepper	2,427,432	52.41	+14.93
Republican	Vivek Ramaswamy; Rob McColley	2,051,557	44.29	−18.03
Libertarian	Don Kissick; James L. Mills	153,011	3.30	N/A
Write-in				
Total votes		4,632,000		
Democratic gain from Republican				

Counties that flipped from Republican to Democratic

- Delaware (largest municipality: Delaware)
- Erie (largest municipality: Sandusky)
- Hamilton (largest municipality: Cincinnati)
- Lake (largest municipality: Mentor)
- Lorain (largest municipality: Lorain)
- Lucas (largest municipality: Toledo)
- Mahoning (largest municipality: Youngstown)
- Montgomery (largest municipality: Dayton)
- Portage (largest municipality: Kent)
- Summit (largest municipality: Akron)
- Trumbull (largest municipality: Warren)
- Wood (largest municipality: Bowling Green)

== Analysis ==
=== Exit poll ===
2026 Ohio gubernatorial election (CNN)
Demographic subgroup	Acton	Ramaswamy	% of total vote
Ideology
Liberals	96	4	24
Moderates	67	29	38
Conservatives	12	84	38
Party
Democrats	97	2	31
Republicans	9	87	38
Independents	62	33	31
Donald Trump job approval
Approve	4	93	41
Disapprove	87	9	57
2024 presidential vote
Kamala Harris	98	1	43
Donald Trump	10	86	49
Another candidate	67	14	2
Did not vote	74	14	4
Gender
Men	48	49	48
Women	56	41	52
Income
$100,000 or more	53	45	36
$50,000-$99,999	50	47	34
Less than $50,000	55	40	29
Race/ethnicity
White	48	49	85
Latino	62	36	2
Black	89	8	8
White born-again or evangelical Christian?
Yes	19	77	27
No	65	32	73
Race by gender
White men	44	53	41
White women	51	45	44
Black men	87	9	3
Black women	90	7	5
All other voters	63	31	8
Age
18–29 years old	72	24	10
30–44 years old	65	31	20
45–64 years old	49	47	35
65 and older	43	55	36
Area type
Urban	72	25	15
Suburban	59	39	45
Rural	38	59	39
Education
College graduate	62	35	42
No college degree	45	51	58
Education by race
White college graduates	60	38	36
Non-white college graduates	80	17	6
Whites without college	40	57	49
Non-whites without college	74	22	9
Education by gender and race
White women with college degrees	65	34	19
White women without college degrees	40	55	24
White men with college degrees	53	44	17
White men without college degrees	38	59	24
Voters of color	77	20	15
Educational attainment
Advanced degree	69	30	18
Bachelor's degree	58	39	25
Associate's degree	47	49	12
Some college	52	45	20
Never attended college	40	56	24

== Aftermath ==
Following the election, the Republican-controlled Ohio Legislature proposed a constitutional amendment to lower the threshold to override a governor veto from the current 60% to a simple majority. The resolution would need to pass with 60% support in both chambers and receive majority support in a voter referendum to pass.

== See also ==
- 2026 United States gubernatorial elections
- 2026 Ohio elections

== Notes ==
Partisan clients

Other notes
