= 2014 Ohio State Auditor election =

- November 4, 2014
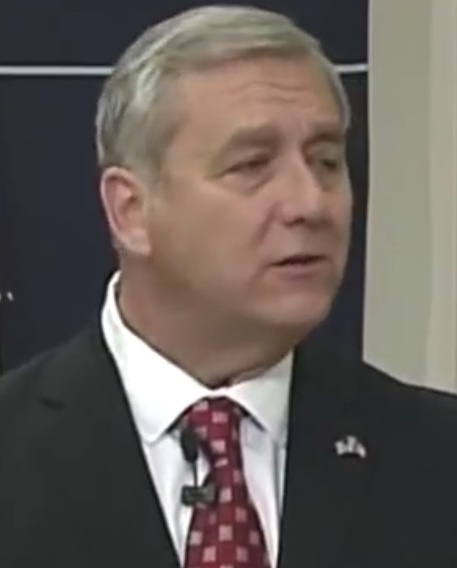

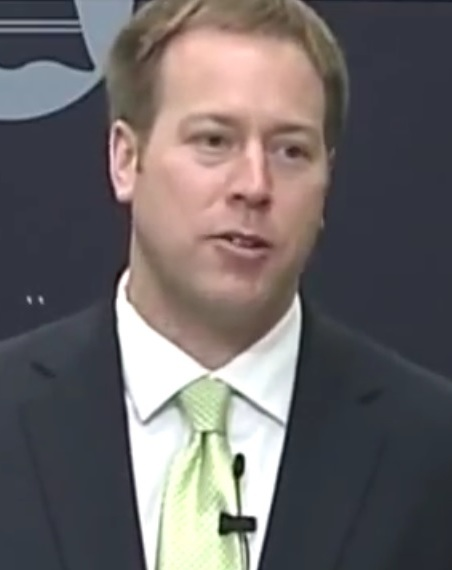
Candidate	Dave Yost	John Patrick Carney
Party	Republican	Democratic
Popular vote	1,711,927	1,149,305
Percentage	56.98%	38.25%
- County results Yost: 40–50% 50–60% 60–70% 70–80% Carney: 50–60%
State Auditor before election
Dave Yost
Republican
Elected State Auditor
Dave Yost
Republican

The 2014 Ohio State Auditor election was held on November 4, 2014, to elect the Ohio State Auditor, concurrently with elections to the U.S. House of Representatives, governor, and other state and local elections. Primary elections were held on May 6, 2014. A debate was held on September 15, 2014, between all three candidates running, being the only debate held for any statewide election in Ohio in 2014.

Incumbent Republican auditor Dave Yost won re-election to a second term in office against Democratic state representative John Patrick Carney by a margin much greater than his previous victory in 2010.

== Republican primary ==
=== Candidates ===
==== Nominee ====
- Dave Yost, incumbent state auditor (2011–present)

=== Results ===
Republican primary results
Party	Candidate	Votes	%
Republican	Dave Yost (incumbent)	498,760	100.0%
Total votes		498,760	100.0%

== Democratic primary ==
=== Candidates ===
==== Nominee ====
- John Patrick Carney, state representative from the 22nd district (2009–present)

=== Results ===
Democratic primary results
Party	Candidate	Votes	%
Democratic	John Patrick Carney	360,933	100.0%
Total votes		360,933	100.0%

== Libertarian primary ==
The Libertarian Party was not recognized as a major party in 2014 due to newly established rules regarding state recognition of political parties. Two Libertarians running for governor and attorney general were removed from the ballot in March 2014, which drew controversy. Bob Bridges, the only Libertarian running for auditor, ran a write-in primary campaign.

=== Candidates ===
==== Nominee ====
- Bob Bridges, director of the Libertarian Party of Ohio and tow truck driver

=== Results ===
Libertarian primary results
Party	Candidate	Votes	%
Libertarian	Bob Bridges (write-in)	797	100.0%
Total votes		797	100.0%

== General election ==
=== Endorsements ===
Dave Yost (R)

Newspapers and other media

- The Canton Repository
- The Cincinnati Enquirer
- The Columbus Dispatch
- The Plain Dealer
- The Times-Reporter
John Patrick Carney (D)

Labor unions

- Columbus Education Association

Organizations

- Ohio Fraternal Order of Police

=== Debate ===
2014 Ohio State Auditor debate
No.	Date	Host	Moderator	Link	Republican	Democratic	Libertarian
Key: P Participant A Absent N Not invited I Invited W Withdrawn							
Key: P Participant A Absent N Not invited I Invited W Withdrawn					Dave Yost	John Patrick Carney	Bob Bridges
1	September 15, 2014	City Club of Cleveland	Nick Castele	YouTube	P	P	P

=== Results ===
2014 Ohio State Auditor election
Party	Candidate	Votes	%
Republican	Dave Yost (incumbent)	1,711,927	56.98%
Democratic	John Patrick Carney	1,149,305	38.25%
Libertarian	Bob Bridges	143,363	4.77%
Total votes		3,004,595	100.0%
Republican hold			
