= Frank LaRose =

American politician (born 1979)

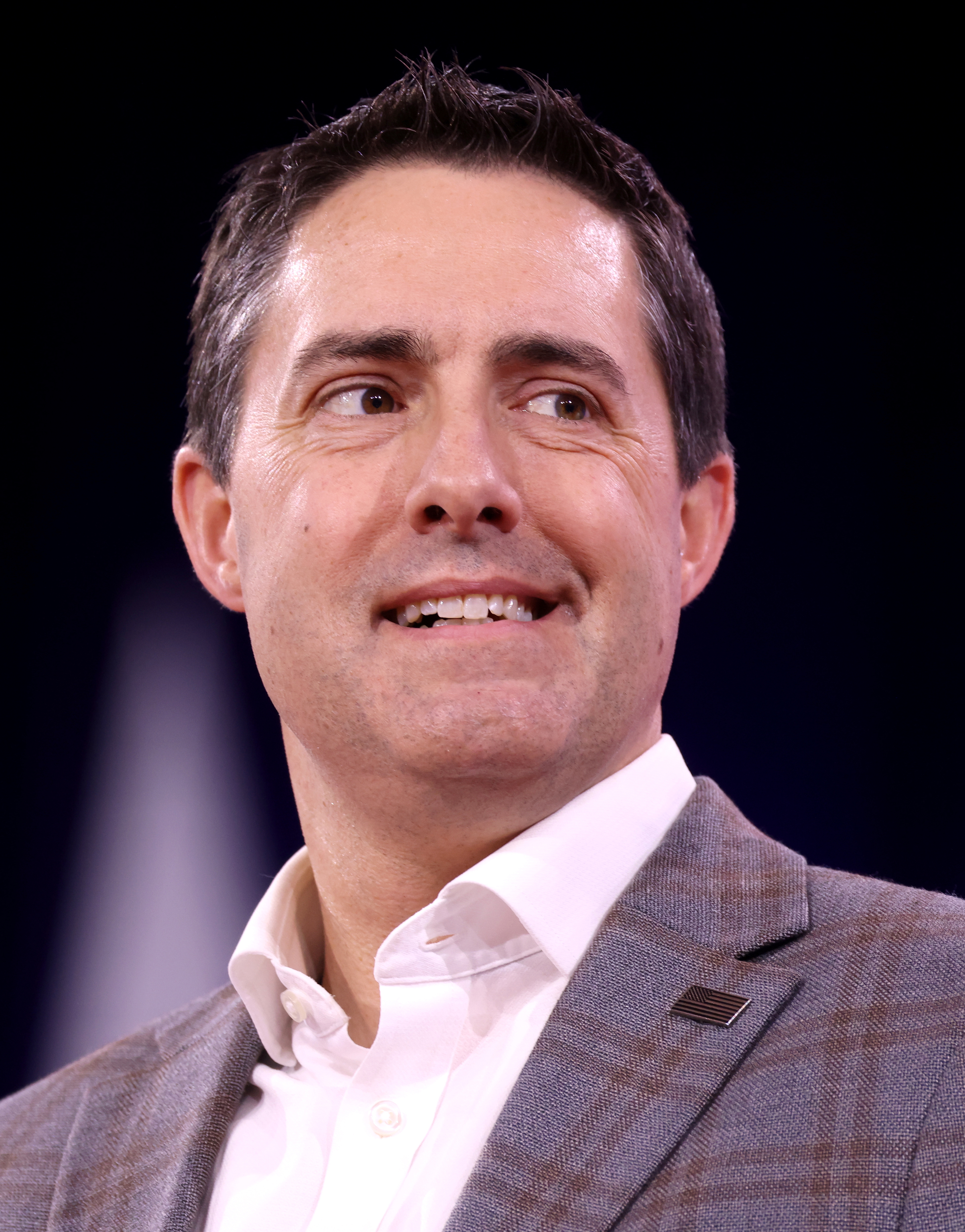
- LaRose in 2025

Auditor-elect of Ohio
- Assuming office January 11, 2027
- Governor: Amy Acton (elect)
- Succeeding: Keith Faber

51st Secretary of State of Ohio
- Incumbent
- Assumed office January 14, 2019
- Governor: Mike DeWine
- Preceded by: Jon Husted

Member of the Ohio Senate from the 27th district
- In office January 1, 2011 – January 1, 2019
- Preceded by: Kevin Coughlin
- Succeeded by: Kristina Roegner

Personal details
- Born: April 18, 1979 (age 47) Akron, Ohio, U.S.
- Party: Republican
- Spouse: Lauren Kappa
- Children: 3
- Education: Ohio State University (BS)

Military service
- Allegiance: United States
- Branch/service: United States Army; U.S. Army Reserve
- Years of service: 1998–2007; 2021–present
- Rank: Sergeant first class
- Unit: 101st Airborne Division; 19th Special Forces Group
- Battles/wars: Iraq War
- Awards: Bronze Star Medal

Frank LaRose (born April 18, 1979) is an American politician who is the Auditor-elect of Ohio. A Republican, LaRose has served as the 51st secretary of state of Ohio since January 2019. He was member of the Ohio State Senate for two terms, from January 2011 to January 2019. He was a Republican candidate for Ohio's U.S. Senate seat in the 2024 election, finishing third in the primary behind Matt Dolan and eventual nominee, Bernie Moreno.

== Early life, military career, and education ==
LaRose was born at Akron City Hospital and grew up in Copley Township in Summit County, Ohio. His grandfather started the House of LaRose, a beverage bottling and distribution company in Akron, Ohio, where Frank worked growing up. He has four siblings and worked on the family farm during his childhood.

LaRose graduated from Copley High School. He subsequently enlisted in the United States Army in 1998, serving in the 101st Airborne Division and later, the U.S. Special Forces as a green beret. He received the Bronze Star for his service in Iraq. He has said that his military service influenced his desire to protect elections and voters' rights.

He graduated from Ohio State University with a Bachelor of Science degree in consumer affairs and a minor in business administration.

== Ohio Senate ==
=== Elections ===
LaRose ran for Ohio Senate in 2010 and defeated the Democratic nominee, Summit County councilman Frank Comunale, in the 27th District, a Democratic-leaning district, by 56.5% to 43.5%.

LaRose won re-election to his seat in 2014 with 67.7% of the vote. The anti-abortion advocacy group Ohio Right to Life endorsed LaRose's opponent in the 2014 Republican primary. LaRose had previously voted against Governor John Kasich's nomination of Ohio Right to Life president Mike Gonidakis to the state medical board in 2012.

=== Tenure ===
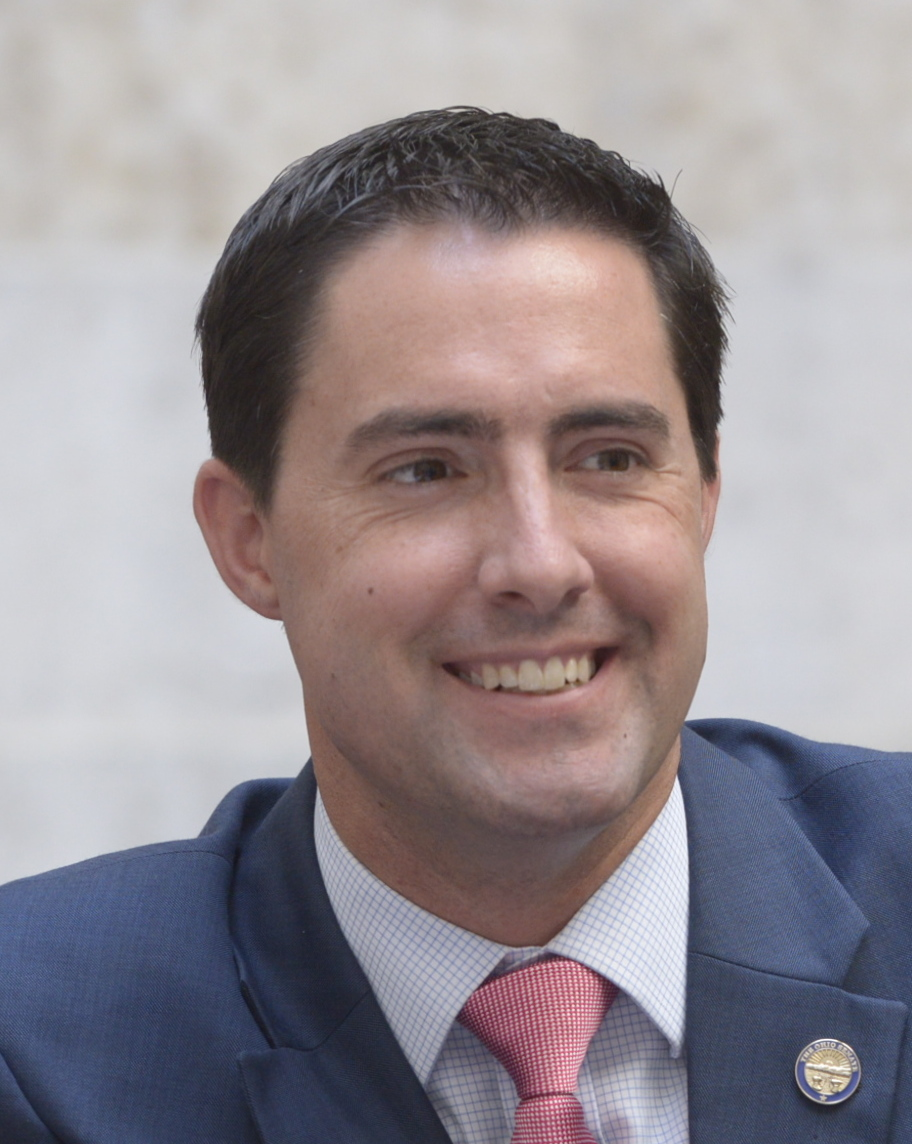
LaRose in 2014

LaRose was sworn into the Ohio Senate in 2011. Governing magazine named him one of "12 State Legislators to Watch in 2014".

LaRose was chair of the Ohio Senate Transportation Committee; the Commerce and Workforce Committee; the State and Local Government Committee; the Public Safety, Local Government, and Veterans Affairs Committee; and the Joint Committee on Agency Rule Review.

LaRose voted for Senate Bill 5 which reduced collective bargaining rights for public workers (including police, firefighters and teachers). He said that he agonized over the decision. After the bill, which passed by a narrow margin, was repealed by a public referendum, LaRose said, "The voters have made it clear that this was not the course they wished to take." In 2018, LaRose said, "As I look back on [my yes vote on SB5] am I confident I did the right thing? Not necessarily."

LaRose sponsored Senate Bill 238, which removed the so-called "golden week" period where a voter was permitted to both register to vote and cast a ballot. SB 238 was signed into law on February 21, 2014.

LaRose successfully advocated for funding the purchase of electronic poll books in the state operating budget. Electronic poll books make voting more accessible and efficient and helps county boards of elections shorten voting lines while maintaining accuracy. HB 64 was signed into law on June 30, 2015.

LaRose was named the 2015 Legislator of the Year by the Ohio Association of Election Officials due to his efforts to minimize gerrymandering, modernize Ohio's elections system, and increase campaign finance transparency in local elections.

LaRose sponsored Senate Bill 63, which was signed into law by Governor John Kasich in 2016. This bill allowed Ohio residents to register to vote online.

In 2017, he sponsored legislation to prevent women from having abortions after a fetal diagnosis of Down syndrome.

LaRose authored legislation to update Ohio's campaign finance law by allowing campaign finance reports to be filed electronically with local boards of elections. This legislation removed the paper-only filing requirement that municipal, county, and local candidates and campaign committees were previously required to use when filing with county boards of elections. This legislation passed the Ohio Senate in multiple General Assemblies and was signed into law in 2019.

== Ohio Secretary of State (2019-present) ==
=== Elections ===
==== 2018 ====
On May 17, 2017, LaRose announced that he would run for Ohio secretary of state in the 2018 election. LaRose defeated the Democratic state representative Kathleen Clyde in the general election, 50.9% to 46.7%.

Early during the campaign, LaRose indicated that he would continue enforcing the voter list maintenance state law, known as "purging", which removes voters from voter rolls if those voters had not voted for six consecutive years. Later during the campaign, LaRose said that he thought the process could be better. In 2016, LaRose opposed automatic voter registration, but said during the campaign that he supported automatic voter registration if it included an opt-out clause for those who do not wish to register. While in the Ohio Senate, LaRose sponsored legislation to eliminate Ohio's "Golden Week" (a five-day period when Ohioans could register and vote on the same day) as another measure to prevent voter fraud. During the 2018 campaign, LaRose said he favored a different same-day registration system in states such as New Hampshire that take precautions against voter fraud.

During the campaign, Clyde supported a shift to a uniform paper ballot system in Ohio; LaRose said he favored the current system where there is a requirement for a paper trail for ballots but all counties are allowed to use their own machines. Clyde called for the adoption of postal voting to replace early in-person voting; LaRose supported the existing system which is a combination of early in-person voting and requesting absentee ballots.

==== 2022 ====
In May 2021, LaRose announced his bid for reelection in the 2022 Ohio secretary of state election.

The Columbus Dispatch reported in 2022 that LaRose had "maintained a careful balance between champion of Ohio elections and skeptic of how other states conducted voting" since 2020. While a spokesman for LaRose's campaign told the Dispatch that "Ohio's elections are well-run and run with integrity", the Dispatch noted that LaRose had additionally "espoused a sense of urgency around voter fraud in recent months" during his reelection campaign. In April, Trump announced his endorsement of LaRose at a rally held in Delaware, Ohio.

LaRose defeated state representative John Adams in the Republican primary held on May 3, 2022. After his victory in the Republican primary, he was set to run against Democratic candidate Chelsea Clark, a member of the Forest Park city council, and conservative podcaster Terpsehore Maras, an independent candidate who has supported QAnon conspiracy theories, in the November general elections. A challenge to Maras' inclusion on the election ballot, filed by the Ohio Republican Party in August, led LaRose's office to rule that Maras failed to gather sufficient signatures to run in the election.

=== Tenure ===
On January 12, 2019, LaRose was sworn in to serve as Ohio's 51st secretary of state, a four-year term. He was the "first Summit County resident elected Ohio secretary of state in about 166 years", according to Jim Simon, master of ceremonies of LaRose's swearing-in. The Secretary of State offices are in the Continental Plaza high-rise in downtown Columbus.

As secretary of state, LaRose has focused on election security, voter list maintenance, and ballot access rules.

In April 2019, he observed the Ukrainian presidential election. He promoted simplifying the voter roll maintenance, or "purging," process in May 2019. He also sought automated voter registration, stating that he was crafting an election reform bill on the issue. In May, LaRose defended Ohio's congressional districts, opposed by Democrats for being gerrymandered to favor the Republican representatives in power. In June, he ordered county boards of elections to undergo security upgrades for the 2020 election.

Cleveland.com reported in September 2019 that, as the top election official in Ohio, LaRose had spent "months working on a project to purge Ohio's inactive voters while also trying to address long-standing criticisms of the controversial process". LaRose had focused on fixing issues with voter list maintenance, including, for the first time, publishing the names of voters who could be removed from the voter rolls for inactivity. This increase in transparency led to finding various mistakes and recognizing thousands of voters who had been unduly marked as inactive by their respective counties. He was urged to halt the state law required voter list maintenance of inactive voters by Democrats over errors, but he defended the "purge." That month, his office was reviewing Ohio voter registrations that might have been incorrectly deleted in vendor errors, with Democrats suing. The state ultimately determined that around 40,000 entries included on the list of 235,000 voters to be purged were errors, thanks to the list of inactive voters being made public for the first time by Secretary LaRose.

In September 2019, he was released from a February 2019 lawsuit filed by members of environmental activist groups, who "accused elections officials of using unconstitutional tactics that kept certain initiatives from going before voters". On September 19, he said he was in the process of distributing $12.8 million Election Assistance Commission funds.

On October 25, 2019, the Ohio governor signed Senate Bill 52 (originally sponsored by Secretary LaRose while he was in the state senate), which strengthened Ohio's cybersecurity and elections infrastructure, required post-election audits by all county boards of elections, and made LaRose a member of Ohio's Homeland Security Advisory Council.

In December 2019, LaRose recommended 77 non-citizens who voted and 18 voters who voted twice to the attorney general and county prosecutors.

Following the 2020 United States elections held on November 3, 2020, LaRose stated that there were "no serious irregularities with voting", contrary to president Donald Trump's baseless claims of election fraud.

Before the 2020 primary election, with COVID cases appearing in Ohio, LaRose relocated polling sites away from senior living facilities, recruited new, younger poll workers, and required curbside absentee ballot drop-off at the county boards of elections on election day during voting hours.

On March 16, the day before the primary election, the Ohio Department of Health recommended all Ohioans over the age of 65 self-quarantine and Governor DeWine asked the Ohio Supreme Court to delay the primary until a later date (June 2), as the Governor or the Secretary of State lack the authority to move an election. Secretary LaRose proposed sending absentee ballot requests to every voter, followed by prepaid absentee ballots to those who requested one, with an in person election day on June 2.

The Ohio legislature chose April 28 as the postponed vote-by-mail only election day with a bipartisan plan, approved unanimously by the Ohio House and Senate, including sending postcards to every Ohioan with instructions on how to apply for an absentee ballot. The plan also allowed for one secure drop box per county board of elections for voters to place their absentee ballots if they did not have time to mail them. On April 28, there were reports of long car lines outside county boards of elections as Ohioans who were not able to mail their absentee ballots the day before had to drop them off to make sure their vote counted. Mailed ballots were also taking longer, sometimes 7–9 days, to reach voters.

==== Issue 1 - increase threshold for voter-led initiatives ====
LaRose, who in 2022 led the effort to eliminate August elections in all cases except for fiscal emergencies, agreed to support an August 2023 election to decide Issue 1, a constitutional amendment proposal backed by Republican state lawmakers. Ohio Issue 1 would raise the threshold for amending the Ohio constitution from the current simple majority, the unchallenged standard in the state since 1912, to 60% supermajority. In testimony in December 2022, LaRose wrote about some August 2020 special elections with what he called "embarrassingly low turnout" of 11.8% and 6.8%. "That means just a handful of voters end up making big decisions. The side that wins is often the one that has a vested interest in the passage of the issue up for consideration. This isn't how democracy is supposed to work."

The proposal attracted national attention as part of a broader debate over citizen-led ballot initiatives.

LaRose supported the passage of 2023 Ohio Issue 1, which would have made it substantially harder for voter-led initiatives to amend the Ohio State Constitution be proposed and approved. When LaRose was asked if Issue 1 was related to an abortion vote, he said, "If this is about one specific issue, then somebody's not really focused on what we're trying to accomplish here." At a Lincoln Dinner in May 2023, LaRose told supporters the August election was "100% about keeping a radical pro-abortion amendment out of our constitution." On July 25, 2023, LaRose certified an initiative for the November 7, 2023, ballot that would legalize abortion in the state. The Libertarian Party of Ohio filed a complaint with federal officials alleging that LaRose's Issue 1 advocacy violated the Hatch Act for "using his office and official authority to influence, interfere with and affect an Ohio election." Issue 1 was soundly rejected by voters 56.7% to 43.3% in the August election.

In 2024, as chair of the Ballot Board, LaRose was criticized for the ballot summary of a citizens initiative on redistricting, Issue 1. The summary said that the law would be amended to purportedly require rather than stem gerrymandering.

=== Campaign contributions during the House Bill 6 period ===
Campaign finance filings from the Ohio Secretary of State show that Frank LaRose received contributions from political action committees representing utility and regulated industry interests during the period surrounding the passage of House Bill 6 (HB 6), later central to the Ohio nuclear bribery scandal. These included a $1,000 contribution from the American Electric Power PAC in 2019.

== 2024 U.S. Senate campaign ==
On July 17, 2023, LaRose announced that he was running for U.S. Senate, seeking to challenge Democratic incumbent Sherrod Brown in the 2024 election. At the beginning of his campaign, LaRose polled first in the 2024 Republican primary field over challengers state senator Matt Dolan and businessman Bernie Moreno.

On July 24, 2023, LaRose endorsed former president Donald Trump in his campaign for re-election. In the following month, LaRose dismissed his press secretary Rob Nichols for posts on social media critical of Trump. Despite his early polling lead, LaRose finished in third place in the March 2024 Republican primary.

== 2026 Ohio state auditor campaign ==
On February 6, 2025, LaRose announced that he was running for Ohio state auditor in 2026, seeking to succeed Keith Faber, who was term-limited. He faced Democratic nominee Annette Blackwell, the mayor of Maple Heights, Ohio in the November 3, 2026 general election. LaRose narrowly defeated Blackwell, making him the only statewide Republican to win their race in Ohio in the 2026 elections.

== Political positions ==
As secretary of state and previously as a state senator, Frank LaRose has taken positions on election administration, ballot access, and voting regulations that have drawn both support and criticism, particularly during debates over voter list maintenance and citizen-initiated ballot measures.

=== Election administration and voter-fraud referrals ===
In 2025, LaRose's office referred more than 1,000 alleged voter-fraud cases to the U.S. Department of Justice. Reporting from statewide outlets noted that many cases involved registration mismatches or clerical discrepancies, and that only a small subset had previously resulted in county-level prosecutions.

=== Proof-of-citizenship proposal ===
In November 2025, LaRose endorsed legislation requiring documentary proof of U.S. citizenship to register to vote. Supporters described the measure as an election-integrity initiative, while several civil-rights groups and some county election officials expressed concerns that it could impose administrative burdens and risk disenfranchising eligible voters.

=== August 2023 special election (Issue 1) to require 60% approval for citizen-initiated constitutional changes ===
In 2023, LaRose supported putting Issue 1 to voters in an August special election — a measure that would have required a 60% super-majority (instead of a simple majority) to amend the state constitution.

The decision to hold the August election — even though the state legislature had recently moved to abolish most August special elections — drew criticism. Opponents argued the timing and proposed threshold change would make citizen-initiated constitutional amendments considerably more difficult.

=== Ballot access requirements ===
During his tenure, LaRose backed proposals to change the rules for citizen-initiated constitutional amendments, including Issue 1 in 2023, which would have increased the share and geographic distribution of signatures required and shortened the period to gather additional signatures. News coverage noted that the steeper signature requirements applied only to citizen-initiated amendments, and critics argued the changes would make it harder for grassroots campaigns to place measures on the ballot, while supporters said they were needed to protect the state constitution from special interests.

== Personal life ==
LaRose lives in Columbus, Ohio, with his wife, Lauren, and their three daughters. He is an Eagle Scout. He is a board member of the Ohio Historical Society, a junior vice commander of the Fairlawn Veterans of Foreign Wars and a member of the executive board for the Great Trail Council, Boy Scouts of America.

== Electoral history ==
Republican primary results, 2010
Party	Candidate	Votes	%
Republican	Frank LaRose	15,279	100.00%
Total votes		15,279	100.00%

Ohio's 27th Senate district general election, 2010
Party	Candidate	Votes	%
Republican	Frank LaRose	66,742	56.5%
Democratic	Frank Comunale	51,386	43.5%
Total votes		118,128	100.00%
Republican hold			

Republican primary results, 2014
Party	Candidate	Votes	%
Republican	Frank LaRose (incumbent)	10,778	61.8%
Republican	Caleb Davenport	6,654	38.2%
Total votes		17,432	100.00%

Ohio's 27th Senate district general election, 2014
Party	Candidate	Votes	%
Republican	Frank LaRose	64,259	67.7%
Democratic	George Rusiska	30,610	32.3%
Total votes		94,869	100.00%
Republican hold			

Republican primary results, 2018
Party	Candidate	Votes	%
Republican	Frank LaRose	606,697	100.00%
Total votes		606,697	100.00%

Ohio Secretary of State election, 2018
Party	Candidate	Votes	%
Republican	Frank LaRose	2,210,356	50.7%
Democratic	Kathleen Clyde	2,049,944	47.0%
Libertarian	Dustin Nanna	103,392	2.4%
Total votes		4,363,692	100.0%
Republican hold			

Republican primary results, 2022
Party	Candidate	Votes	%
Republican	Frank LaRose (incumbent)	613,378	64.7%
Republican	John Adams	335,457	35.3%
Total votes		948,835	100%

Ohio's Secretary of State election, 2022
Party	Candidate	Votes	%
Republican	Frank LaRose (incumbent)	2,444,382	59.29%
Democratic	Chelsea Clark	1,635,824	39.68%
Independent	Terpsehore Tore Maras	42,753	1.04%
Total votes		4,122,959	100.00%
Republican hold			

2024 United States Senate election in Ohio, Republican primary results
Party	Candidate	Votes	%
Republican	Bernie Moreno	557,626	50.48%
Republican	Matt Dolan	363,013	32.86%
Republican	Frank LaRose	184,111	16.67%
Total votes		1,104,750	100.00%

Party political offices
Preceded by Jon Husted	Republican nominee for Secretary of State of Ohio; 2018, 2022	Succeeded by Robert Sprague
Preceded by Keith Faber	Republican nominee for Auditor of Ohio; 2026	Most recent
Political offices
Preceded by Jon Husted	Secretary of State of Ohio; 2019–present	Incumbent
Preceded by Keith Faber	Auditor of Ohio; Taking office 2027	Elect
