= 2026 Ohio Issue 3 =

Require Voter ID Amendment

- November 3, 2026
- Require Voter Identification Amendment

Results
Choice	Votes	%
Yes	2,934,245	65.33%
No	1,556,864	34.67%
Valid votes	4,491,109	100.00%
Invalid or blank votes	0	0.00%
Total votes	4,491,109	100.00%
- Results by county Yes: 50–60% 60–70% 70–80% 80–90% No: 50–60%

Ohio Issue 3 is a legislatively referred constitutional amendment that will appear on the November 3, 2026, ballot in the U.S. state of Ohio. If approved, the state's constitution will be amended to require a photo ID to vote.

== Background ==
Under current Ohio law, photo ID (such as a United States passport or a current Ohio driver's license) must be presented when voting. State law also requires absentee voters to provide a copy of their photo ID, driver's license or identification number, or the last four digits of their Social Security number. Voters with a religious objection to being photographed can complete an affidavit in order to vote.

Issue 3 would enshrine the current laws by amending the Ohio constitution to require photo ID for in-person voting and either photo ID or "a signature plus one other unique identifier authorized by law" for absentee voting. The constitution would also be amended to allow for the state legislature to create a separate process for ID verification among voters with a religious objection to being photographed.

== Endorsements ==
Yes

Executive branch officials

- Donald Trump, president of the United States (2017–2021, 2025–present) (Republican)

Statewide officials

- Amy Acton, former director of the Ohio Department of Health (2019–2020) and 2026 gubernatorial candidate (Democratic)
- Robert Sprague, treasurer of Ohio (2019–present) (Republican)

State legislators

- Adam Bird, HD-66 (2021–2022) and HD-63 (2023–present) (Republican)
- Theresa Gavarone, Senate majority leader (2025–present) from SD-02 (2019–present) (Republican)
- Matt Huffman, speaker of the Ohio House of Representatives (2025–present) from HD-78 (2025–present) and former president of the Ohio Senate (2021–2024) from SD-12 (2017–2024) (Republican)
- Jane Timken, SD-29 (2025–present) (Republican)
- Heidi Workman, HD-72 (2025–present) (Republican)

Party officials

- Alex Triantafilou, chair of the Ohio Republican Party (2023–present)

Individuals

- Vivek Ramaswamy, founder of Roivant Sciences and 2026 gubernatorial candidate (Republican)

Political parties

- Ohio Republican Party

Newspapers

- The Vindicator
No

State legislators

- Bill DeMora, SD-25 (2023–present) (Democratic)
- Allison Russo, former House minority leader (2022–2025) from HD-07 (2019–present) (Democratic)
- Desiree Tims, HD-38 (2025–present) (Democratic)
- Terrence Upchurch, HD-20 (2019–present) (Democratic)

Labor unions

- United Auto Workers

Organizations

- ACLU of Ohio
- Ohio Citizen Action
- Ohio Legislative Black Caucus
- Red Wine & Blue

== Polling ==
Poll source	Date(s) administered	Sample size (Note: Key: A – all adults RV – registered voters LV – likely voters V – unclear)	Margin of error	Phrasing	Yes	No	Undecided
Suffolk University (Note: Poll sponsored by USA Today)	September 23–27, 2026	500 (LV)	± 4.4%	–	61%	31%	8%
Honest Elections Project Action (Note: Poll conducted by the political action committee of the Honest Elections Project, which supports stronger voter ID laws.)	May 27 – June 2, 2026	800 (LV)	± 3.46%	–	70%	30%	

== Notes ==
Partisan clients
