= 2026 Ohio elections =

- November 3, 2026

The 2026 Ohio general elections took place on November 3, 2026, throughout the US state of Ohio. All of Ohio's United States House of Representatives districts and one U.S. Senate seat were up for election. Additionally, half of the Ohio Senate, all seats of the Ohio House of Representatives, parts of the state judiciary, and several state executive offices, including the governor, appeared on the ballot.

Due to term limits, the incumbent governor and several other statewide officers first elected in 2018 were ineligible for re-election. Several of those officers sought other elected positions.

Democrats won every statewide office with the exception of State Auditor.

== Federal ==
=== Senate ===
A special election was held for the U.S. Senate seat formerly held by JD Vance, who resigned to become the vice president, concurrent with the general election. Republican Jon Husted, the former lieutenant governor, was appointed to the seat in January 2025, and ran to serve the remainder of Vance's term. He was defeated by Democratic former Senator Sherrod Brown, who will take office on December 15th.

=== House of Representatives ===
All of Ohio's 15 seats in the United States House of Representatives were up for election in 2026. For the first time since 2008, Democrats won a majority of the state’s House seats, winning 8-7.

== State executive ==
Ohio's state executives are up for election. Most of these positions are held by incumbents who have reached their term limits and are ineligible to run for re-election in 2026.

=== Governor and lieutenant governor ===
Incumbent Republican governor Mike DeWine was ineligible to seek a third term. Democrat Amy Acton defeated Republican Vivek Ramaswamy, becoming the first Democratic governor of the state since 2006, and the state’s first elected female governor. Acton’s running mate was former state party chair David Pepper, and Ramaswamy’s running mate was state senator Robert McColley.

=== Attorney general ===
Ohio's attorney general was up for re-election. Incumbent Republican Dave Yost is ineligible due to term limits. Democrat John Kulewicz narrowly defeated Keith Faber.

=== Secretary of state ===
The Ohio secretary of state was up for election to a four-year term. Incumbent Republican Frank LaRose was ineligible for re-election. Democrat Allison Russo defeated Republican Robert Sprague.

=== Treasurer ===
The state treasurer was up for election. Incumbent Republican Robert Sprague was ineligible to seek re-election. Democrat Cincinnati city councilman, Seth Walsh, defeated Republican former state representative Jay Edwards.

=== Auditor ===
The state auditor was up for election. The incumbent, Republican Keith Faber, was term-limited and ineligible to run for re-election. Republican Secretary of State Frank LaRose defeated Democrat Annette Blackwell, becoming the only Republican to win statewide in this year’s election.

== State legislative ==
Elections for both houses of the Ohio General Assembly were held in 2026.

=== Senate ===
The 17 odd-numbered districts out of 33 seats in the Ohio Senate were up for election in 2026. Prior to the election, eleven of these seats were held by Republicans and six were held by Democrats. Republicans lost 2 seats, narrowly holding onto a supermajority.

=== House of Representatives ===
All 99 seats in the Ohio House of Representatives were up for election in 2026. Prior to the election, sixty-five of these seats were held by Republicans and thirty-four were held by Democrats. Republicans lost 8-13 seats (final results pending), breaking their supermajority in the state House that they had held since 2012.

== State judicial ==
Multiple state judicial offices were up for election in 2026. Due to a bill passed in June 2021, Ohio Supreme Court and Ohio Court of Appeals elections are partisan, showing a party label next to each candidate.

=== Supreme Court ===
Two of the seven justices of the Ohio Supreme Court were up for re-election to a six-year term. Previously, six seats were held by Republicans and one was held by a Democrat. Both seats were won by Democrats.

=== Courts of Appeals ===
The Ohio District Courts of Appeals consists of 69 judges in 12 districts. Judges serve a 6-year term. Approximately 1/3 of these positions are up for election every two years.
