= 2018 Ohio Secretary of State election =

- November 6, 2018
- Registered: 8,070,917
- Turnout: 55.79%
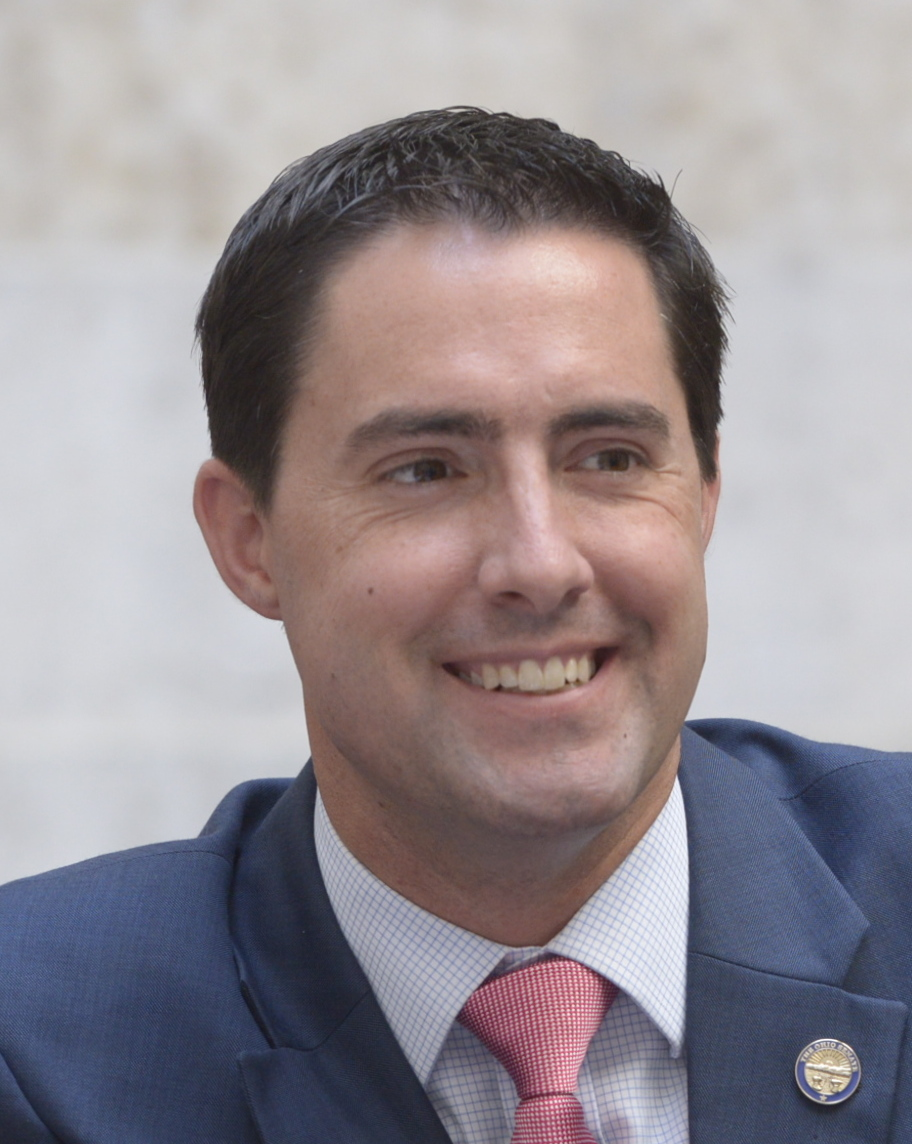

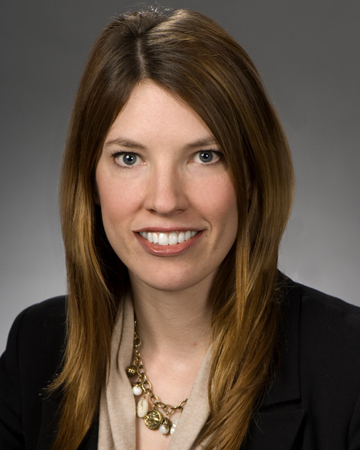
Candidate	Frank LaRose	Kathleen Clyde
Party	Republican	Democratic
Popular vote	2,214,273	2,052,098
Percentage	50.67%	46.96%
- LaRose: 40–50% 50–60% 60–70% 70–80% 80–90% >90% Clyde: 40–50% 50–60% 60–70% 70–80% 80–90% >90% Tie: 40–50% No data
Secretary of State before election
Jon Husted
Republican
Elected Secretary of State
Frank LaRose
Republican

The 2018 Ohio Secretary of State election was held on November 6, 2018, to elect the Ohio Secretary of State, concurrently with elections to the United States Senate, U.S. House of Representatives, governor, and other state and local elections. Primary elections were held on May 8, 2018, though both the Republican and Democratic nominees ran uncontested.

Incumbent secretary Jon Husted was term-limited and instead was the Republican nominee for lieutenant governor. Republican state senator Frank LaRose defeated Democratic state representative Kathleen Clyde in the general election.

== Republican primary ==
=== Candidates ===
==== Nominee ====
- Frank LaRose, state senator from the 27th district (2011–present)

==== Withdrawn ====
- Dorothy Pelanda, state representative from the 86th district (2011–2019) (endorsed LaRose)

=== Results ===
Republican primary results
Party	Candidate	Votes	%
Republican	Frank LaRose	606,697	100.0%
Total votes		606,197	100.0%

== Democratic primary ==
=== Candidates ===
==== Nominee ====
- Kathleen Clyde, state representative from the 75th district (2011–present)

=== Primary endorsements ===
Kathleen Clyde

Organizations

- Pro-Choice Ohio

=== Results ===
Democratic primary results
Party	Candidate	Votes	%
Democratic	Kathleen Clyde	514,959	100.0%
Total votes		514,959	100.0%

== General election ==
=== Endorsements ===
Frank LaRose (R)

U.S. governors

- Bob Taft, former Governor of Ohio (1999–2007), former Ohio Secretary of State (1991–1999), and state representative from the 65th district (1977–1981)

Statewide officials

- Ken Blackwell, former Ohio Secretary of State (1999–2007), former Treasurer of Ohio (1994–1999), and nominee for governor in 2006

State representatives

- Dorothy Pelanda, state representative from the 86th district (2011–2019) (originally ran against LaRose)

Newspapers and other media

- The Columbus Dispatch

Organizations

- Buckeye Firearms Association
- Fraternal Order of Police of Ohio
- Ohio Chamber of Commerce
- Ohio Society of CPAS
Kathleen Clyde (D)

U.S. presidents

- Barack Obama, President of the United States (2009–2017), U.S. Senator from Illinois (2005–2008), and Illinois state senator from the 13th district (1997–2004)

Executive branch officials

- Joe Biden, Vice President of the United States (2009–2017) and U.S. Senator from Delaware (1973–2009)

U.S. senators

- Sherrod Brown, U.S. Senator from Ohio (2007–present), U.S. representative from OH-13 (1993–2007), former Ohio Secretary of State (1983–1991), and state representative from the 61st district (1975–1983)

Labor unions

- International Brotherhood of Boilermakers, Iron Ship Builders, Blacksmiths, Forgers and Helpers

Newspapers and other media

- Akron Beacon Journal
- The Plain Dealer
- The Toledo Blade

Organizations

- EMILYs List
- Human Rights Campaign
- Planned Parenthood Action Fund

=== Predictions ===
Source	Ranking	As of
Governing	Tossup	October 11, 2018

=== Polling ===
Poll source	Date(s) administered	Sample size (Note: Key: A – all adults RV – registered voters LV – likely voters V – unclear)	Margin of error	Frank LaRose (R)	Kathleen Clyde (D)	Undecided
Gravis Marketing	October 29–30, 2018	789 (LV)	± 3.5%	40%	38%	22%
Baldwin Wallace University	October 19–27, 2018	1,051 (LV)	± 3.8%	33%	39%	21%
Suffolk University (Note: Poll sponsored by the Cincinnati Enquirer)	October 4–8, 2018	500 (RV)	± 4.4%	33%	42%	19%
Baldwin Wallace University	September 28 – October 8, 2018	1,017 (LV)	± 3.5%	32%	32%	27%
Change Research (D) (Note: Poll sponsored by Innovation Ohio)	August 31 – September 4, 2018	822 (LV)	± 3%	42%	40%	18%
Fallon Research	May 21–25, 2018	800 (V)	± 3.46%	32%	31%	37%
Public Policy Polling (D) (Note: Poll sponsored by the Ohio Democratic Party)	April 25–26, 2018	770 (V)	3.5%	40%	43%	17%

=== Results ===
2018 Ohio Secretary of State election
Party	Candidate	Votes	%
Republican	Frank LaRose	2,214,273	50.67%
Democratic	Kathleen Clyde	2,052,098	46.96%
Libertarian	Dustin Nanna	103,506	2.37%
Write-in	Michael Bradley	79	0.00%
Total votes		4,369,956	100.00%
Republican hold			

==== By congressional district ====
LaRose won 12 of 16 congressional districts.

District	LaRose	Clyde	Representative
1st	52%	46%	Steve Chabot
2nd	54%	43%	Brad Wenstrup
3rd	28%	70%	Joyce Beatty
4th	63%	34%	Jim Jordan
5th	59%	38%	Bob Latta
6th	64%	33%	Bill Johnson
7th	60%	38%	Bob Gibbs
8th	64%	33%	Warren Davidson
9th	35%	62%	Marcy Kaptur
10th	51%	46%	Mike Turner
11th	18%	80%	Marcia Fudge
12th	53%	45%	Troy Balderson
13th	43%	55%	Tim Ryan
14th	52%	46%	David Joyce
15th	54%	44%	Steve Stivers
16th	54%	44%	Anthony Gonzalez
