= 2022 Ohio Secretary of State election =

- November 8, 2022
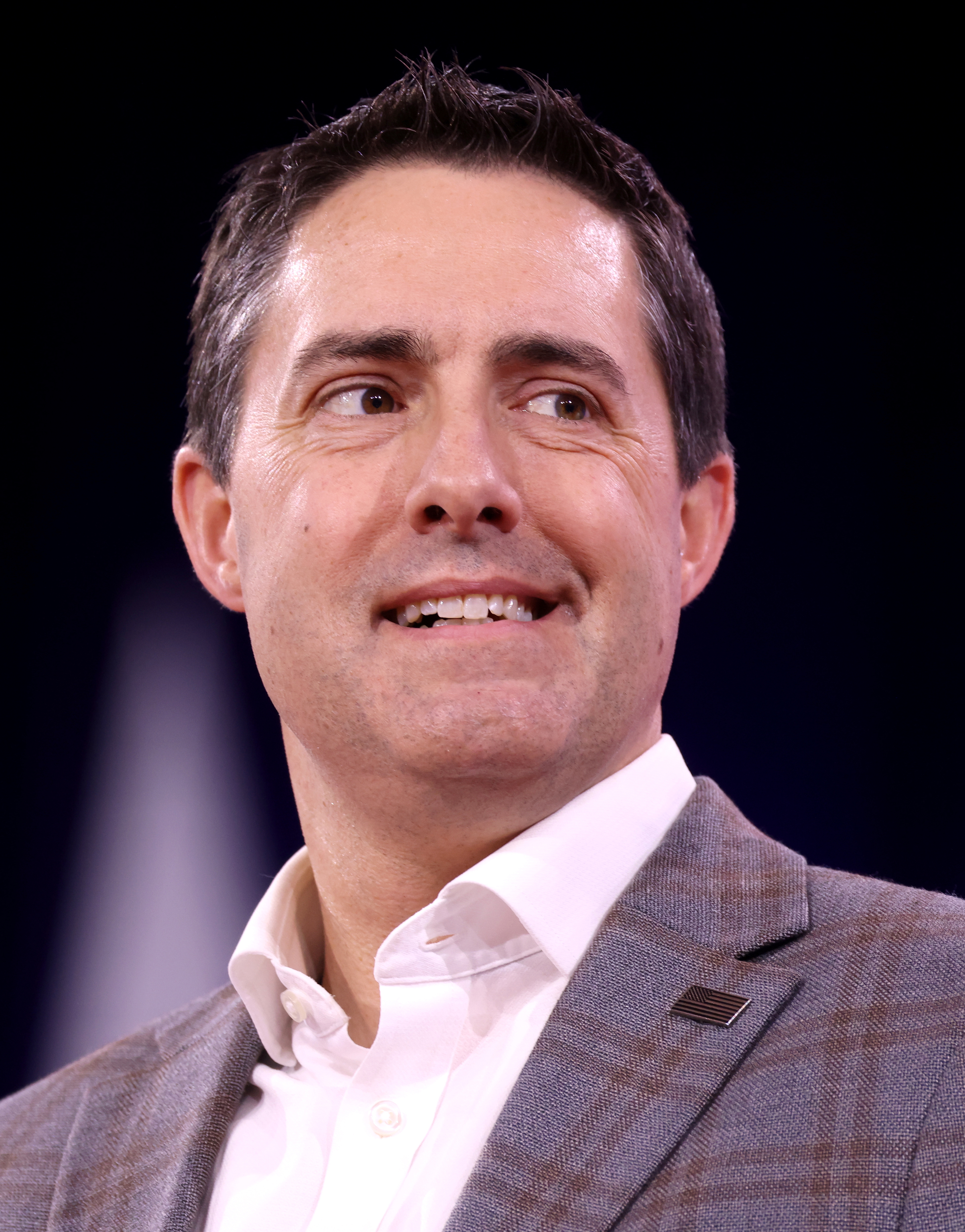

Nominee	Frank LaRose	Chelsea Clark
Party	Republican	Democratic
Popular vote	2,444,382	1,635,824
Percentage	59.29%	39.68%
- LaRose: 40–50% 50–60% 60–70% 70–80% 80–90% >90% Clark: 40–50% 50–60% 60–70% 70–80% 80–90% >90% Tie: 40–50% 50% No votes
Secretary of State before election
Frank LaRose
Republican
Elected Secretary of State
Frank LaRose
Republican

The 2022 Ohio Secretary of State election was held on November 8, 2022, to elect the Secretary of State of Ohio. Incumbent Republican Frank LaRose won re-election to a second term.

== Republican primary ==
=== Candidates ===
==== Nominee ====
- Frank LaRose, incumbent Secretary of State

==== Eliminated in primary ====
- John Adams, former state representative from the 85th district (2007–2014)

==== Disqualified ====
- Terpsichore “Tore” Maras-Lindeman, podcaster (running as an Independent)

=== Endorsements ===
GOP Primary results by county LaRose: 50–60%; 60–70%; 70–80%; Adams: 50–60%; 60–70%

John Adams

Organizations

- Ohio Value Voters
Frank LaRose

Executive branch officials

- Donald Trump, 45th president of the United States (2017–2021)

Newspapers and other media

- The Chronicle-Telegram (Republican primary only)
- The Plain Dealer (Republican primary only)

Organizations

- Columbiana County Republican Party
- Knox County Republican Party
- Ohio Republican Party

=== Results ===
Republican primary results
Party	Candidate	Votes	%
Republican	Frank LaRose (incumbent)	613,378	64.7
Republican	John Adams	335,457	35.3
Total votes		948,835	100

== Democratic primary ==
=== Candidates ===
==== Nominee ====
- Chelsea Clark, Forest Park city council member

=== Results ===
Democratic primary results
Party	Candidate	Votes	%
Democratic	Chelsea Clark	434,038	100.0
Total votes		434,038	100.0

== General election ==
=== Predictions ===
Source	Ranking	As of
Sabato's Crystal Ball	Safe R	December 1, 2021
Elections Daily	Safe R	November 7, 2022

=== Results ===
State Senate district results

2022 Ohio secretary of state election
Party	Candidate	Votes	%	±%
Republican	Frank LaRose (incumbent)	2,444,382	59.29%	+8.64%
Democratic	Chelsea Clark	1,635,824	39.68%	−7.30%
Independent	Terpsehore Tore Maras	42,753	1.04%	N/A
Total votes		4,122,959	100.00%	
Republican hold				

==== By congressional district ====
LaRose won 13 of 15 congressional districts, including three that elected Democrats.

District	LaRose	Clark	Representative
1st	51%	48%	Steve Chabot (117th Congress)
1st	51%	48%	Greg Landsman (118th Congress)
2nd	75%	24%	Brad Wenstrup
3rd	35%	64%	Joyce Beatty
4th	72%	27%	Jim Jordan
5th	68%	31%	Bob Latta
6th	68%	31%	Bill Johnson
7th	59%	40%	Bob Gibbs (117th Congress)
7th	59%	40%	Max Miller (118th Congress)
8th	66%	33%	Warren Davidson
9th	57%	41%	Marcy Kaptur
10th	58%	41%	Mike Turner
11th	25%	74%	Shontel Brown
12th	70%	30%	Troy Balderson
13th	55%	44%	Tim Ryan (117th Congress)
13th	55%	44%	Emilia Sykes (118th Congress)
14th	62%	37%	David Joyce
15th	59%	40%	Mike Carey
