= Elizabeth Walters =

American politician and Chair of the Ohio Democratic Party

Liz Walters
- Walters speaking in 2024.

Chair of the Ohio Democratic Party
- In office January 14, 2021 – June 10, 2025
- Preceded by: David Pepper
- Succeeded by: Kathleen Clyde

Personal details
- Born: Northeast Ohio, U.S.
- Party: Democratic
- Education: Saint Vincent College (BA); Cleveland State University (MPA)
- Website: Campaign website

Elizabeth Maureen Walters is an American politician who served as the chair of the Ohio Democratic Party from 2021 to 2025. Walters was the first woman to hold the position. She has also served on the Summit County Council since February 2016.

Walters stepped down in 2025 to take on a new role with Targetsmart, a national Democratic political data firm. There were allegations of impropriety around Walters' hiring by Targetsmart. Former state representative Kathleen Clyde succeeded Walters as chair of the Ohio Democratic Party.

Party political offices
Preceded by David Pepper	Chair of the Ohio Democratic Party; 2021–2025	Succeeded by Kathleen Clyde
