= John Adams (Ohio politician) =

American politician (born 1960)

Member of the Ohio House of Representatives from the 85th district
- In office January 2, 2007 – December 31, 2014
- Preceded by: Derrick Seaver
- Succeeded by: Nino Vitale

Personal details
- Born: January 14, 1960 (age 66) Urbana, Ohio, U.S.
- Party: Republican
- Education: Edison State Community College; Mesa Community College

John Adams (born January 14, 1960) is an American politician who served as a member of the Ohio House of Representatives from 2007 to 2014. For part of his tenure, he served as the majority whip. In 2022, he ran for Ohio Secretary of State, but was defeated by incumbent Secretary of State Frank LaRose in the Republican primary.

== Early life ==
Adams was born in Urbana, Ohio. He has studied at Mesa Community College and Edison State Community College. Adams was a Navy SEAL and later worked for Bethlehem Steel.

== Career ==
He is the owner and operator of a furniture store. Adams has served two terms on the Board of Directors of the Shelby County United Way and was elected as president in 1991.

=== Politics ===
When incumbent Representative Derrick Seaver did not seek another term in 2006, Adams was one of four who sought to replace him. He won the Republican nomination with 50.26% of the electorate. He won the general election with 52.37% of the vote over Democrat Adam Ward.

In his first reelection bid in 2008, Adams ran unopposed. He became the minority whip in the House for the 128th General Assembly.

He won a third term in 2010 with 74.27% of the vote over Democrat Anthony Ehresmann. Soon after, House colleagues elected Adams to be majority whip of the 129th General Assembly. He was sworn in as whip on January 3, 2011. He also serves on the committees of Commerce, Labor and Technology; Insurance and its Subcommittee on Workers' Compensation; Rules and Reference; and State Government and Elections. Adams is also chairing the Tax Structure Study Committee.

Adams won a final term in 2012 unopposed.

Adams is a member of the conservative American Legislative Exchange Council (ALEC), serving as Ohio state leader.

=== Initiatives and positions ===
In the 128th Ohio General Assembly, Adams introduced a measure that sought to eliminate the Ohio income tax, but was unsuccessful. Ohio Governor John Kasich afterwards used the same initiative as a campaign talking point, to mixed reviews.

Adams introduced a measure to create a panel that reviews the potential of any state-owned property for possible oil and gas drilling. A similar bill was introduced in the Ohio Senate. It would consist of a five-member panel that would open potential state lands up to the highest bidder for oil and gas exploration. While controversial, the bill passed the Ohio House of Representatives, with the promise that the measure would create jobs and help lower energy prices. The bill was signed into law by John Kasich, allowing for oil and gas to now be taken from state lands.

Stating that no profession is immune from economic reality, Adams voted for a bill that limits collective bargaining for public employees.

== Personal life ==
Adams lives in Sidney, Ohio. He and his wife Tara have seven children.
