= Derrick Seaver =

American politician

Member of the Ohio House of Representatives from the 78th district
- In office January 3, 2001 – December 31, 2006
- Preceded by: Jim Jordan
- Succeeded by: John Adams

Personal details
- Born: Derrick Charles Seaver; February 6, 1982 (age 44) Oxford, Ohio, U.S.
- Party: Republican (2004–present)
- Other political affiliations: Democratic (until 2004)
- Education: Wright State University (BA, MA)

Derrick Seaver (born February 6, 1982) is an American politician who served as a member of the Ohio House of Representatives, representing the 78th District from 2001 to 2006.

== Early life and education ==
Derrick Charles Seaver was born on February 6, 1982, in Oxford, Ohio, to Charles Seaver and Kimberly (Winner) Seaver of Minster, Ohio. Seaver is the eldest of three children. He graduated from Minster High School in 2000. Seaver received his Bachelor of Arts in Political Science and Government and a master's degree in International and Comparative Politics, both from Wright State University.

== Career ==
Elected to the Ohio House of Representatives in 2000 as a Democrat, the election was notable because Seaver was an 18-year-old recent high school graduate.

Seaver switched parties to the Republican Party in 2004.

Following his tenure in the Ohio House of Representatives, Seaver has worked as a public policy and political consultant. In 2013, he relocated to the San Francisco Bay Area to serve as the Executive Vice President for the Silicon Valley Organization, which he later renamed the San Jose Chamber of Commerce while serving as its president. He later served as the Director of Policy and Operations for the San Jose Downtown Association, and currently serves as Chief of Staff to Santa Clara County Supervisor Susan Ellenberg.

He now works as a math teacher and football coach at Berean Christian High School in Walnut Creek, California.

Ohio House of Representatives
| Preceded by Jim Jordan | Member of the Ohio House of Representatives from the 85th district 2001–2003 | Succeeded by John M. Schlichter |
| Preceded by Larry Householder | Member of the Ohio House of Representatives from the 78th district 2003–2006 | Succeeded by John Adams |
