= Kathleen Clyde =

American politician (born 1979)

- Clyde in 2025

Chair of the Ohio Democratic Party
- Incumbent
- Assumed office June 10, 2025
- Preceded by: Elizabeth Walters

Member of the Portage County Commission
- In office December 2018 – January 2021
- Preceded by: Mike Kerrigan
- Succeeded by: Tony Badalamenti

Member of the Ohio House of Representatives from the 75th district
- In office January 3, 2011 – December 31, 2018
- Preceded by: Kathleen Chandler
- Succeeded by: Randi Clites

Personal details
- Born: May 18, 1979 (age 47) Garrettsville, Ohio, U.S.
- Party: Democratic
- Education: Wesleyan University (BA); Ohio State University (JD)

Kathleen Clyde (born May 18, 1979) is an American politician who has served as the chair of the Ohio Democratic Party since 2025. She is a former member of the Ohio House of Representatives who represented the 75th District from 2011 to 2018.

== Early life and career ==
Clyde is originally from Garrettsville, Ohio. She was the valedictorian of her class at James A. Garfield High School. After graduation from the Michael E. Moritz College of Law at Ohio State University, where she served as an editor of the law review, Clyde served as Speaker of the House Armond Budish's deputy legal counsel. She also has worked in the Secretary of State's Office and the Ohio Senate. Clyde is a former president of the Public Interest Law Foundation.

== Ohio politics ==
=== Ohio House of Representatives ===
When incumbent Democrat Kathleen Chandler faced term limits in 2010, Clyde was one of three Democratic challengers who sought to replace Chandler, along with Sean Buchanan and Rick Hawksley. Clyde won the nomination with 56.8% of the electorate. In the general election, Clyde faced three opponents: Republican Roak Zeller, Constitution Party candidate Daniel Cartwright, and Independent Richard Duncan. She defeated all three with 48% of the vote to take the seat.

Clyde was sworn into her first term on January 3, 2011, and served on the committees of Agriculture and Natural Resources; Finance and Appropriations and its Higher Education Subcommittee; and State Government and Elections with its Subcommittee on Redistricting.

In 2012, Clyde won reelection with 60.77% of the vote over Republican Nick Skeriotis. She represents the 75th District, which replaced the 68th District.

=== 2018 Ohio Secretary of State campaign ===
Clyde launched a bid to serve as the Ohio Secretary of State on May 16, 2017. On November 6, 2018 Clyde was defeated by State Senator Frank LaRose 46.7 to 50.9%.

She faced Ohio State Sen. Frank LaRose in the general election.

During the campaign, Clyde said she would not continue a policy of purging voters from voter rolls if those voters had not voted for six consecutive years. Clyde supported a shift to a uniform paper ballot system in Ohio; LaRose said he favored the current system where there is a requirement for a paper trail for ballots but all counties are allowed to use their own machines. Clyde called for the adoption of postal voting to replace early in-person voting; LaRose supported the existing system which is a combination of early in-person voting and postal voting.

=== Portage County commissioner ===
In December 2018, Kathleen Clyde was appointed to the Portage County Commission. Resigning from the Ohio House of Representatives, she succeeded Democrat Mike Kerrigan who resigned citing personal reasons. Portage County was represented by much of the 75th Ohio House District, the district Kathleen represented when in the Ohio house of Representatives. Clyde ran for her first full term as County Commissioner in 2020, but was defeated by Republican Tony Badalamenti.

=== Ohio Democratic Party chair ===
On June 10, 2025, Clyde was elected chair of the Ohio Democratic Party.

== National politics ==
Clyde was selected as one of seventeen speakers to jointly deliver the keynote address at the 2020 Democratic National Convention.

== Initiatives and positions ==
Clyde has been critical of a plan by Ohio Secretary of State Jon Husted to not allow voters as much time to cast absentee ballots. "Voting is already a confusing process," said Rep. Clyde, who was director of the Early Voting Center in Franklin County in 2008. "It discourages voting," she said of Husted's attempt to limit voting processes.

Party political offices
Preceded by Nina Turner	Democratic nominee for Secretary of State of Ohio; 2018	Succeeded by Chelsea Clark
Preceded by Elizabeth Warren	Keynote Speaker of the Democratic National Convention; 2020; Served alongside: Stacey Abrams, Raumesh Akbari, Colin Allred, Brendan Boyle, Yvanna Cancela, Nikki Fried, Robert Garcia, Malcolm Kenyatta, Marlon Kimpson, Conor Lamb, Mari Manoogian, Victoria Neave, Jonathan Nez, Sam Park, Denny Ruprecht, Randall Woodfin	Succeeded by Angela Alsobrooks
Preceded by Elizabeth Walters	Chair of the Ohio Democratic Party; 2025–present	Incumbent
