= 2026 Ohio State Auditor election =

- November 3, 2026
- Reporting: 98% as of 2:35 PM EST
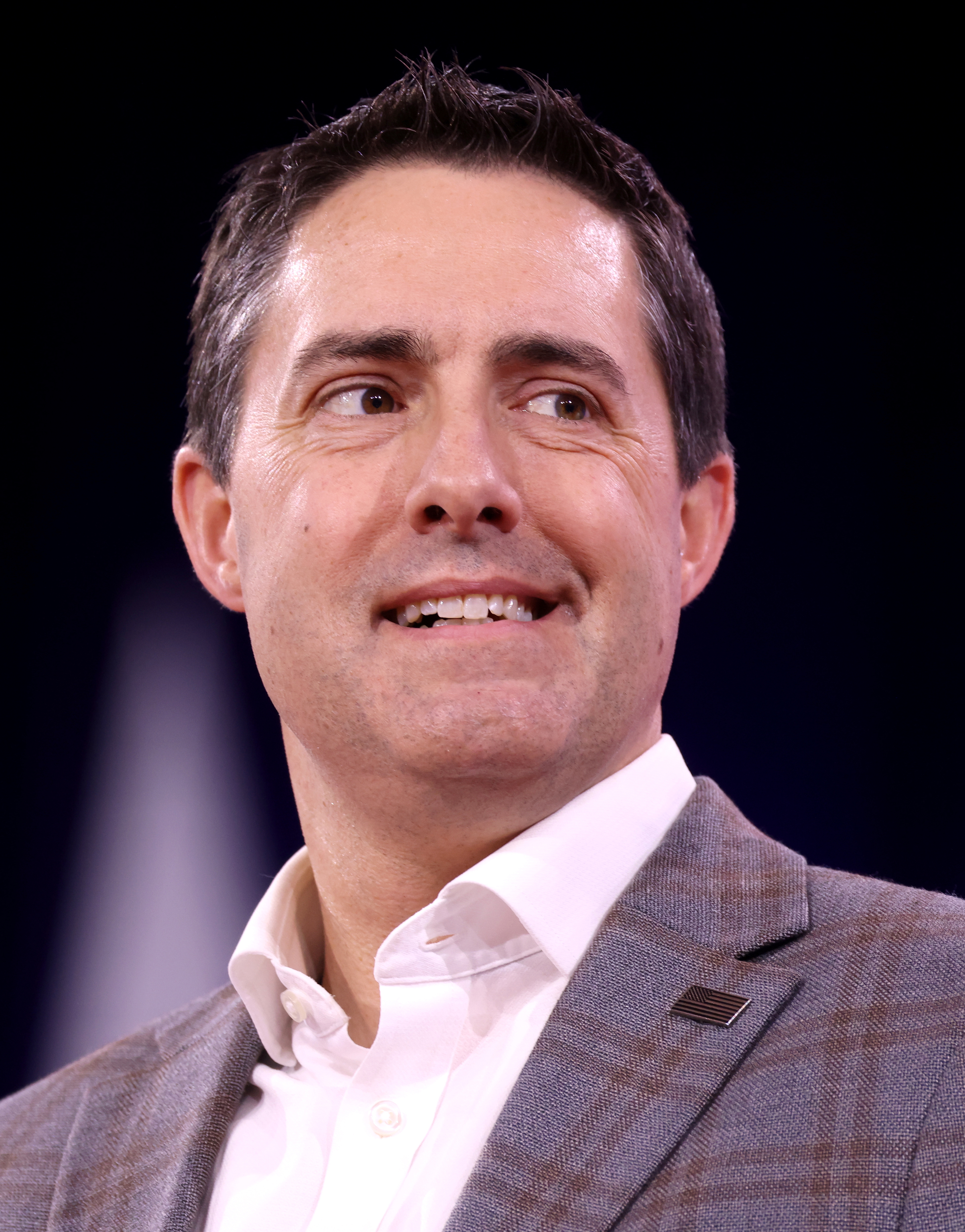

Nominee	Frank LaRose	Annette Blackwell
Party	Republican	Democratic
Popular vote	2,310,105	2,237,955
Percentage	50.79%	49.21%
- County results LaRose: 50–60% 60–70% 70–80% 80–90% Blackwell: 50–60% 60–70%
State Auditor before election
Keith Faber
Republican
Elected State Auditor
Frank LaRose
Republican

The 2026 Ohio state auditor election took place on November 3, 2026, to elect the state auditor of Ohio. Incumbent Republican Keith Faber was term-limited and ineligible to run for re-election. He was running for attorney general of Ohio. Primary elections were held on May 5.

Frank LaRose, the incumbent Ohio Secretary of State, narrowly defeated Democratic nominee Annette Blackwell. This was the only statewide office won by a Republican in Ohio in the 2026 elections.

== Republican primary ==
=== Candidates ===
==== Nominee ====
- Frank LaRose, secretary of state (2019–present)

=== Results ===
Republican primary results
Party	Candidate	Votes	%
Republican	Frank LaRose	723,968	100.0
Total votes		723,968	100.0

== Democratic primary ==
=== Candidates ===
==== Nominee ====
- Annette Blackwell, mayor of Maple Heights (2016–present)

=== Results ===
Democratic primary results
Party	Candidate	Votes	%
Democratic	Annette Blackwell	687,318	100.0
Total votes		687,318	100.0

== Libertarian primary ==
Jeffery did not advance to the general election, after failing to receive the minimum 500 votes in the primary.

=== Candidates ===
==== Eliminated in primary ====
- Aidan Jeffery (write-in)

=== Results ===
Libertarian primary results
Party	Candidate	Votes	%
Libertarian	Aidan Jeffery (write-in)	441	100.0
Total votes		441	100.0

== General election ==
=== Results ===
2026 Ohio state auditor election (est. 98% in)
Party	Candidate	Votes	%	±%
Republican	Frank LaRose	2,310,105	50.79	−7.96
Democratic	Annette Blackwell	2,237,955	49.21	+7.96
Total votes		4,548,060	100.0	
Republican hold				
