= Buckeye Institute =

Ohio-based public policy research organization

Coordinates: 39.9630°N 82.9984°W

The Buckeye Institute
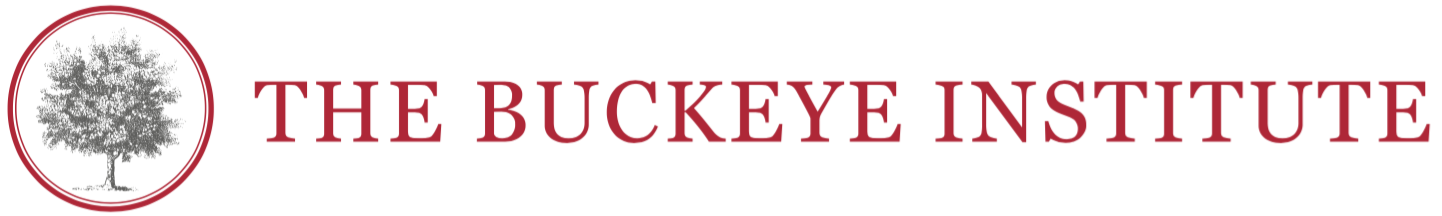
- Formation: 1989; 37 years ago
- Founder: Sam Staley
- Type: Nonprofit public policy think tank
- Location(s): 88 East Broad St., S-1120; Columbus, OH 43215, United States
- President & CEO: Robert Alt
- Revenue: $4.58 million (2024)
- Expenses: $3.06 million (2024)
- Staff: 17 (2024)
- Website: www.buckeyeinstitute.org

The Buckeye Institute is a 501(c)(3) conservative public policy think tank. The organization, based in Columbus, Ohio, says its mission is "to advance free-market public policy in the states."

== History and leadership ==
In 1989, economist Sam Staley founded the Urban Policy Research Institute (UPRI) in Dayton, Ohio. In 1994, UPRI was reorganized into the Buckeye Institute. The organization's original researchers were centered at Wright State University. In 1999, The Buckeye Institute moved from Dayton to Columbus, Ohio.

Columbus Mayor Greg Lashutka was formerly chair of the organization's board of directors. Matt Mayer, who went on to found Opportunity Ohio, led the organization from 2009 through 2011. Robert Alt, The Buckeye Institute's current president, assumed that role in October 2012.

== Organizational structure ==
The Buckeye Institute has several research fellows and scholars responsible for conducting the group's research into various public policy debates, including health care, education, and economic development. The Buckeye Institute started a legal advocacy group, the 1851 Center for Constitutional Law, which was eventually spun off on its own.

== Policy issues ==
The Buckeye Institute has eight focus areas: accountable government, budget and taxes, education, energy and environment, federalism, health care, labor, and legal. In each of those issue areas, Buckeye staff produce peer-reviewed policy reports, provide expert testimony to Ohio's state legislature and the United States Congress, and submit amicus briefs to state and federal courts, including the Supreme Court of the United States.

As part of its accountable government priority area, the Buckeye Institute also has searchable salary databases, using publicly available information, for local, state, K-12, and higher education public employees. The organization has called its salary databases “the key to transparency” for government. Ohio Treasurer Josh Mandel mirrored the Buckeye Institute's efforts on his own transparency website.

=== Taxes and spending ===
The Buckeye Institute has supported a reduction in the Ohio state income tax. The Buckeye Institute has twice published "The Piglet Book", an account of government spending that it deems wasteful.

In 2006, the organization supported a proposed constitutional amendment that would have placed annual limits on the growth of tax revenue and government spending, similar to other states' Taxpayer Bills of Rights.

=== Education ===
The Institute produces reports and research that promote a market-based approach to education, including vouchers and charter schools.

In 2008, the Buckeye Institute launched a database which includes publicly available information about the salaries of Ohio public school teachers.
