= 2010 Ohio State Auditor election =

- November 2, 2010
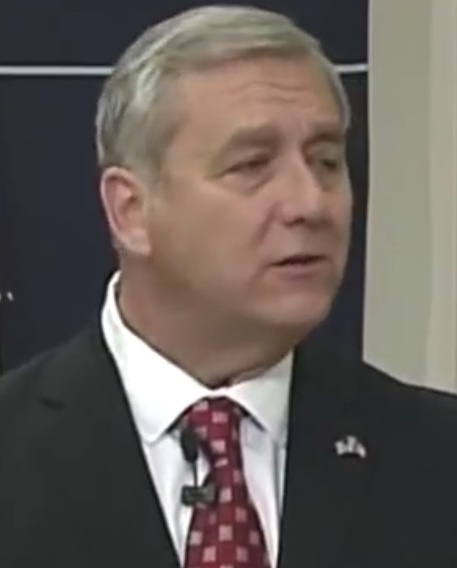

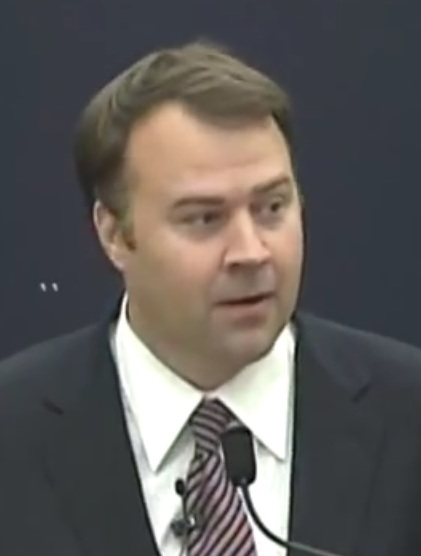
Candidate	Dave Yost	David Pepper
Party	Republican	Democratic
Popular vote	1,882,010	1,683,330
Percentage	50.22%	44.91%
- County results Yost: 40-50% 50-60% 60-70% 70-80% Pepper: 40-50% 50–60% 60–70%
State Auditor before election
Mary Taylor
Republican
Elected State Auditor
Dave Yost
Republican

The 2010 Ohio State Auditor election was held on November 2, 2010, to elect the Ohio State Auditor, concurrently with elections to the United States Senate, U.S. House of Representatives, governor, and other state and local elections. Primary elections were held on May 4, 2010.

Incumbent Republican state auditor Mary Taylor originally announced she would seek re-election, but instead was the successful Republican nominee for lieutenant governor after being picked by John Kasich as his running mate in January 2010. Delaware County prosecutor Dave Yost won the Republican primary against state representative Seth Morgan, and Hamilton County commissioner David Pepper won the Democratic primary unopposed. Yost would go on to win the general election.

== Republican primary ==
=== Candidates ===
==== Nominee ====
- Dave Yost, prosecutor of Delaware County and former auditor of Delaware County (1999–2003)

==== Eliminated in primary ====
- Seth Morgan, state representative from the 36th district (2009–present)

==== Withdrew ====
- Mary Taylor, incumbent state auditor (2007–present) and former state representative from the 43rd district (2003–2006) (ran for lieutenant governor)

=== Results ===
Republican primary results
Party	Candidate	Votes	%
Republican	Dave Yost	457,820	64.88
Republican	Seth Morgan	247,848	35.12
Total votes		705,668	100.0

== Democratic primary ==
=== Candidates ===
==== Nominee ====
- David Pepper, commissioner of Hamilton County

=== Results ===
Democratic primary results
Party	Candidate	Votes	%
Democratic	David Pepper	514,220	100.0
Total votes		514,220	100.0

== Libertarian primary ==
=== Candidates ===
==== Nominee ====
- Michael Howard, accountant and former staffer to the Ohio State Auditor

=== Results ===
Libertarian primary results
Party	Candidate	Votes	%
Libertarian	Michael Howard	4,263	100.0
Total votes		4,263	100.0

== General election ==
=== Results ===
2010 Ohio State Auditor election
Party	Candidate	Votes	%
Republican	Dave Yost	1,882,010	50.22
Democratic	David Pepper	1,683,330	44.91
Libertarian	Michael Howard	182,534	4.87
Total votes		3,747,874	100.0
Republican hold			
