= 2014 Ohio Attorney General election =

- November 4, 2014
- Turnout: 39.4% (▼6.9%)
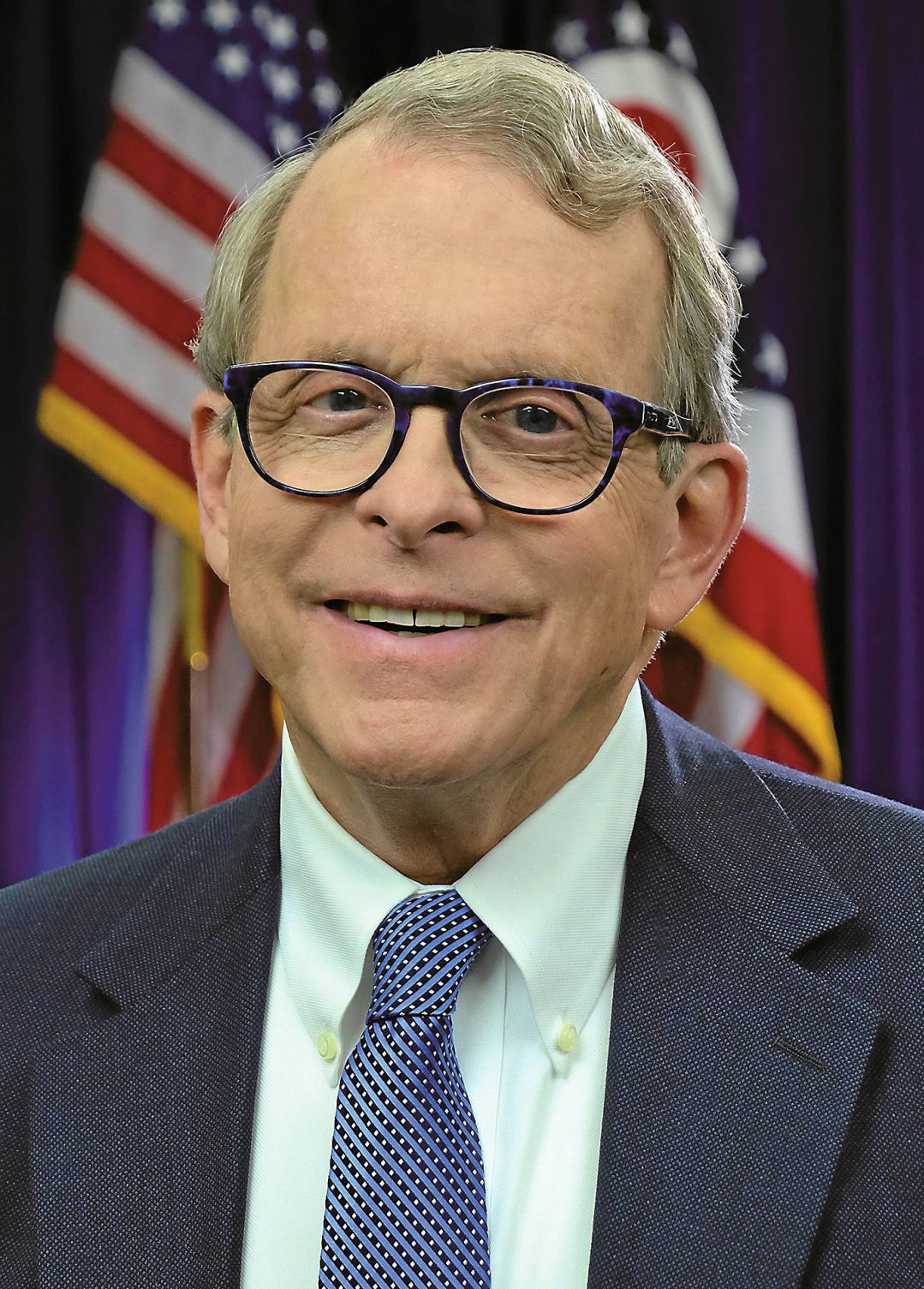

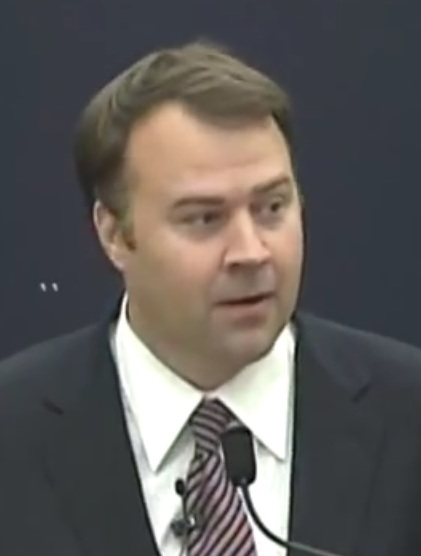
Nominee	Mike DeWine	David Pepper
Party	Republican	Democratic
Popular vote	1,882,048	1,178,426
Percentage	61.50%	38.50%
- County results DeWine: 50–60% 60–70% 70–80% 80–90% Pepper: 50–60%
Attorney General before election
Mike DeWine
Republican
Elected Attorney General
Mike DeWine
Republican

The 2014 Ohio Attorney General election was held on November 4, 2014, concurrently with other statewide offices including the Gubernatorial election. Incumbent Republican Attorney General and former 2-term United States Senator Mike DeWine was challenged by former member of the Hamilton County, Ohio Board of Commissioners and candidate for Auditor in 2010 David Pepper. DeWine won in a landslide, winning 61.5% of the vote to Pepper's 38.5%, a 23-point margin of victory.

To date, this along with many other concurrently held statewide races is the last time Franklin County voted Republican.

== Republican primary ==
=== Candidates ===
==== Nominee ====
- Mike DeWine, incumbent Attorney General, former U.S. Senator, former lieutenant governor of Ohio, and former U.S. Representative.

== Democratic primary ==
=== Candidates ===
==== Nominee ====
- David Pepper, former member of the Hamilton County Ohio Board of Commissioners, Democratic nominee for Auditor in 2010.

== General election ==
=== Polling ===
Poll source	Date(s) administered	Sample size	Margin of error	Mike DeWine (R)	David Pepper (D)	Undecided
The Columbus Dispatch	October 22–31, 2014	1,009	± 3.3%	61%	39%	—
The Columbus Dispatch	September 3–12, 2014	1,185	± 2.7%	60%	32%	7%
Buckeye Poll	August 31, 2014	600	± 4%	41%	22%	37%
Ohio GOP	August 20–23, 2014	800	± 3.5%	60%	31%	9%
Public Policy Polling	August 16–19, 2013	551 RV	± 4.2%	46%	32%	21%

=== Results ===
Ohio Attorney General election, 2014
Party	Candidate	Votes	%	±%
Republican	Mike DeWine (incumbent)	1,882,048	61.50%	+13.96%
Democratic	David Pepper	1,178,426	38.50%	−7.76%
Total votes		3,060,474	100.00%	N/A
Republican hold				

== See also ==
- 2014 Ohio elections
- 2014 United States elections
- 2014 Ohio gubernatorial election
