= Amy Acton =

Governor-elect of Ohio (born 1966)

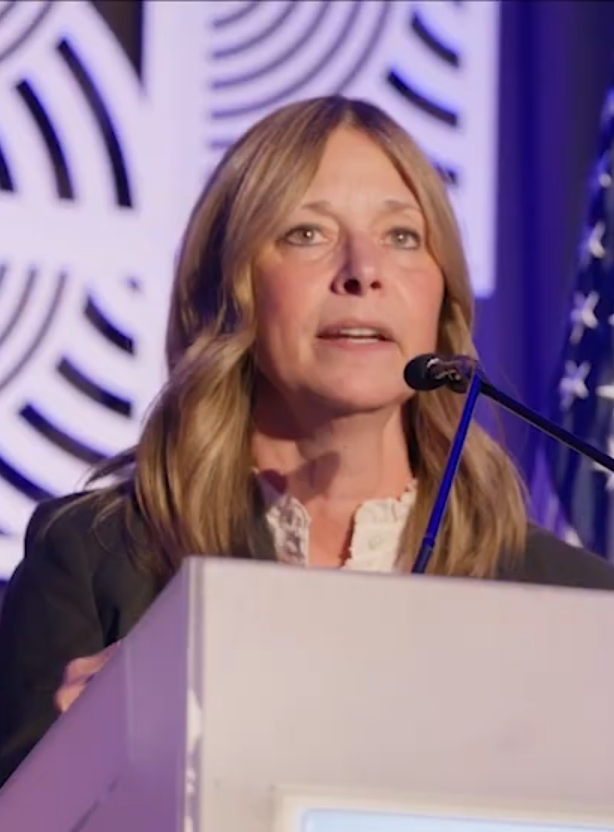
- Acton in 2025

Governor-elect of Ohio
- Assuming office January 11, 2027
- Lieutenant: David Pepper (elect)
- Succeeding: Mike DeWine

Director of the Ohio Department of Health
- In office February 26, 2019 – June 11, 2020
- Governor: Mike DeWine
- Preceded by: Lance Himes
- Succeeded by: Lance Himes (acting)

Personal details
- Born: Amy Leigh Stearns; February 16, 1966 (age 60) Youngstown, Ohio, U.S.
- Party: Democratic
- Spouses: Douglas Beech (m. 1989; div. 2008); Eric Acton (m. 2010)
- Children: 3
- Education: Youngstown State University (BS); Northeast Ohio Medical University (MD); Ohio State University (MPH)
- Website: Campaign website

Amy Leigh Acton (née Stearns, formerly Beech; born February 16, 1966) is an American physician and politician who is the governor-elect of Ohio. She previously served as the director of the Ohio Department of Health, in which capacity she led Ohio's COVID-19 pandemic response from 2019 to 2020 under governor Mike DeWine.

Acton was born and raised in Youngstown, Ohio. She earned a bachelor's degree from Youngstown State University, a Doctor of Medicine degree from the Northeast Ohio Medical University, and a Master of Public Health degree from the Ohio State University.

Before and immediately after serving as director of the Ohio Department of Health, she worked at the Columbus Foundation. She left the foundation upon announcing her candidacy in the 2026 Ohio gubernatorial election. On November 3, 2026, she was elected governor, defeating Republican nominee Vivek Ramaswamy. Acton is the first woman to be elected governor of Ohio and will succeed DeWine on January 11, 2027.

== Early life and education ==
Amy Leigh Stearns was born on February 16, 1966, in Youngstown and grew up in the north side of the city. Her biological father, Gerald Stearns, was Jewish, and her mother, Donna Arthur, belongs to the Baptist Church.

Acton has said that after her parents divorced and while she lived with her mother, she experienced neglect, abuse, and periods of homelessness, including spending one winter living in a tent on the north side of Youngstown. Her mother remarried Cledith Arthur, who had already been prosecuted for raping his daughter; according to Acton and her younger brother, Phil Stearns (both of whom were his stepchildren), Arthur also sexually abused Acton. Arthur was charged with raping her when she was 12, but charges against him stalled after he fled the state and moved to Pennsylvania, despite several warrants being issued for his arrest over the next three years; Acton's mother was later convicted of felony theft by deception.

After Acton's mother lost custody of her, Acton moved in with her biological father, and found more stability. At Liberty High School, she was inducted into the National Honor Society and was named homecoming queen during her senior year in 1984.

Acton paid her way through college, earning a bachelor's degree at Youngstown State University followed by a medical degree from Northeast Ohio Medical University in 1990. After completing residencies in pediatrics and preventive medicine, she earned a master's in public health from Ohio State University. She then trained at Albert Einstein College of Medicine and Nationwide Children's Hospital.

== Career ==
Acton taught at Ohio State University as an associate professor of practice in public health, as well as at the Center for Injury Research and Policy at the Research Institute at Nationwide Children's Hospital in Columbus. She worked at the Columbus Foundation as a grants manager and was director of Project LOVE (Love Our kids, Vaccinate Early), a childhood vaccination initiative started by local Columbus hospitals.

Acton was introduced to political organizing when she volunteered for the Barack Obama 2008 presidential campaign. She created a local email group for Bexley, Ohio, called "Bexley, Yes We Can!" and publicized campaign events using Facebook.

=== Ohio Department of Health director (2019–2020) ===
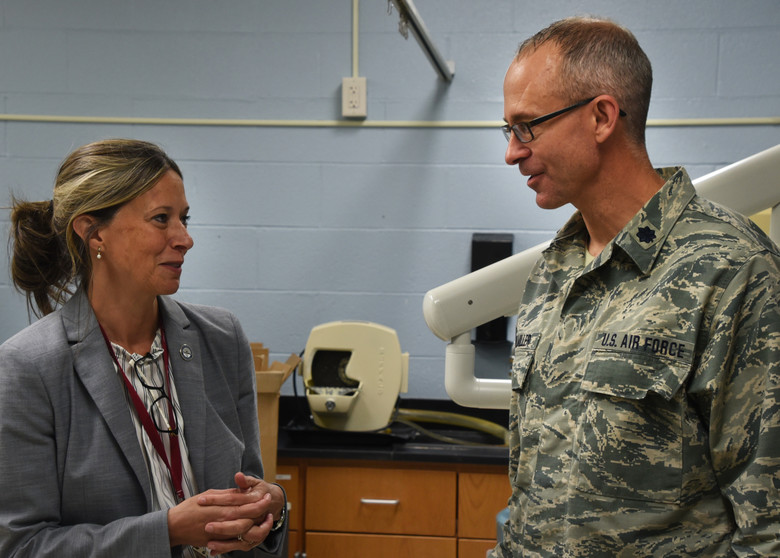
Acton with military dentist and U.S. Air National Guard Lt. Col. Timothy Stuhlmiller in 2019

In February 2019, Ohio governor Mike DeWine, a Republican, made Acton his final cabinet pick as director of the Department of Health. Acton was the first woman in the post. The two previous incumbents were a lawyer and a marketing director; DeWine mentioned wanting to "rethink how we approach this department".

In 2020, before and during the COVID-19 pandemic, Acton advised DeWine, who became the first U.S. governor to close schools and limit gatherings to 100 people. Acton soon estimated that Ohio's then 5 confirmed cases likely translated to 100,000 actual cases, making national news. In mid-March, she predicted cases could peak in late April to mid-May.

On March 12, Acton said of the pandemic, "This will be the thing this generation remembers." Ohio House Minority Leader Emilia Sykes called her "the real MVP of Ohio's coronavirus response". The Dayton Daily News called her "Ohio's trusted face during the pandemic".

Acton was an advocate of postponing the 2020 Ohio Democratic presidential primary, which was slated for March 17, 2020. The day before the scheduled election, DeWine canceled it, but a judge ruled he did not have the authority to do so. Acton then ordered polling places closed due to a public health emergency. It was later determined that the election would be conducted entirely by mail-in absentee ballot for those who had not participated in early voting. In April 2020, CNN called her "the Buckeye state's version of the straight-talking Dr. Anthony Fauci".

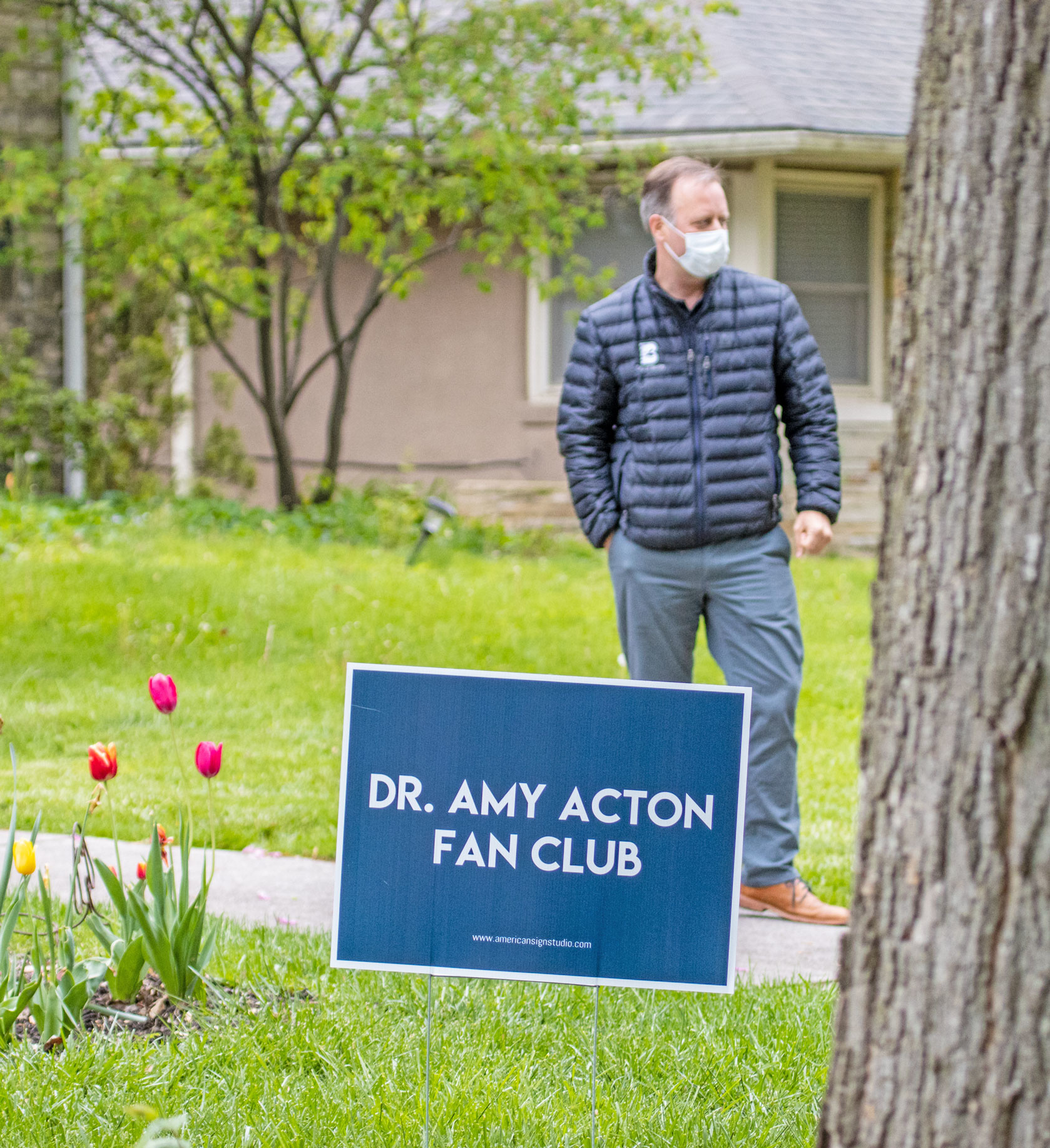
Sign in support of Acton during pandemic

On April 1, DeWine was reported as "quick to defer to Dr. Acton for specific questions on the virus and its spread" during daily news briefings, "reminding Ohioans that the state's decisions are driven by science".

In May 2020, a group of 35 gyms sued the Ohio Department of Health, Acton, and the Lake County General Health District over COVID-related health restrictions, and Lake County Court of Common Pleas Judge Eugene Lucci issued a preliminary injunction blocking the state from "imposing or enforcing penalties solely for non-compliance with the director's order" against gyms and fitness centers, "so long as they operate in compliance with all applicable safety regulations". The state appealed the decision, but Acton had signed an order permitting gyms to reopen in the interim, and a court of appeals later dismissed the case as moot.

Beginning in May 2020, protesters began showing up at Acton's home in Columbus and at press conferences. Acton was assigned a security detail.

On May 20, 2020, the Ohio Senate unanimously voted against a proposal advanced by state House Republicans (and approved by the House on a nearly party-line vote) that would have limited the power of DeWine and Acton by restricting Ohio Department of Health orders to 14 days and requiring any extensions to be approved by a state joint legislative committee. After Republican state legislators and then-Speaker of the House Larry Householder introduced bills that she believed would violate her Hippocratic Oath, Acton resigned on June 11, and became a chief health advisor for DeWine's administration. She has said that her resignation had nothing to do with protesters or the controversy over her and DeWine's stay-at-home orders. Lance Himes succeeded her as interim director. In August, she announced she had left her position as advisor to the administration.

Due to her work as the Director of the Ohio Department of Health, she received a Profile in Courage Award from Caroline Kennedy and Jack Schlossberg. The New York Times called her "The Leader We Wish We All Had".

=== Nonprofit sector work ===
After her resignation, she resumed working for the Columbus Foundation. On February 4, 2021, Acton stepped down from the Columbus Foundation as she considered a run for the Senate in 2022 to succeed Rob Portman. In April 2021, she chose not to run and thanked Ohioans for an "outpouring of support".

In 2022, Acton was named president and chief executive officer of RAPID 5, a nonprofit organization that attempts to improve access to parks in Franklin County, part of the greater Columbus area. She left this position in May 2023.

=== 2026 Ohio gubernatorial campaign ===
In the summer of 2024, Acton attended the Democratic National Convention in Chicago, where she first expressed interest in running for governor of Ohio. On January 7, 2025, she announced her candidacy in the 2026 Ohio gubernatorial election, filing paperwork that day. She ran as a Democrat. By the end of 2025, Acton had raised over $5.3 million for her campaign. In January 2026, Acton chose David Pepper as her running mate. In February, she addressed the affordability of everyday life, specifically healthcare, saying it is "the rising cost of health care that is really putting people over the edge" and citing a reported 20% decline in Marketplace enrollment in Ohio. She suggested tools such as Medicaid and tax credits for caregivers, but also emphasized the need for cooperation with the federal government to solve the issue.

In June 2026, after the U.S. Supreme Court upheld state laws barring transgender girls from girls' sports, Acton told The Toledo Blade that she did "not support boys playing in girls' sports", calling the issue settled law in Ohio and saying she would rather focus on affordability. The statement drew criticism from the Ohio Democratic Progressive Caucus and the nonprofit Equality Ohio. In July 2026, Acton added language to her campaign platform committing to equal protection for LGBTQ+ Ohioans and anti-discrimination laws covering sexual orientation. In August 2026, Acton announced her support for Issue 3, a ballot measure that would add Ohio's existing photo voter identification requirement to the state constitution, breaking with most elected Democrats in Ohio. Acton said, "As this doesn't change what is already law, as governor, I will support it", while pledging to ensure all eligible voters could obtain the required identification easily and at no cost. Her position aligned with that of Ramaswamy, who had endorsed the amendment in May.

On September 6, 2026, during Acton's appearance at the Canfield Fair, a person armed with two handguns and a pair of brass knuckles lunged at Acton and injured multiple people before being subdued and arrested by her security detail; Acton was unharmed. According to the chairman of the Mahoning County Democratic Party, who witnessed the incident, the assailant shoved two campaign volunteers to the ground. Acton has said she would cooperate with federal immigration enforcement as governor. After the Ohio Patrolmen's Benevolent Association endorsed her in August 2026, she said "we always work with the federal law enforcement", and News 5 Cleveland reported she would not stop local police from assisting ICE. She has said law enforcement should focus on violent criminals who are in the country illegally.

During the campaign, Republican nominee Vivek Ramaswamy ran an attack ad featuring Acton's estranged mother, Donna Arthur, who had not seen Acton since Acton was 12 years old. In the ad, Arthur called Acton a "liar". The attack ad saw widespread backlash and was denounced by both Democrats and Republicans, including Ohio governor Mike DeWine and senator Jon Husted. Acton defeated Ramswamy in the general election.

== Policy viewpoints ==
In an interview with Signal Stateside, Acton said her "administration will make a one-time payment eliminating medical debt for Ohioans who qualify based on income". The criteria for the debt elimination include: (Note: Acton referenced in the interview an earlier program with identical criteria, which the Illinois Gov. JB Pritzker which spent $10 million in order to forgive up to $1 billion in debt.)

- Being at or below 400% of the federal poverty level, which is $128,600 for a family of four, and
- Medical debt exceeding 5% of household income

== Awards and honors ==
- 2015: Excellence in Teaching Award, the Ohio State University College of Public Health
- 2021: Profile in Courage Award, John F. Kennedy Presidential Library and Museum
- 2022: Ohio Honoree, USA Today's Women of the Year

== Personal life ==
In 1989, Amy married Douglas Beech, with whom she had three children. The couple divorced in 2008.

In 2010, she married Eric Acton, a middle-school teacher and track coach, who had three children from a previous marriage. Together, they have a blended family of six children.

Acton resides with her family in Bexley, Ohio. She is Jewish, and her husband and his children are Episcopalian.

== See also ==
- List of female governors in the United States

== Notes ==
Party political offices
Preceded by Nan Whaley	Democratic nominee for Governor of Ohio; 2026	Most recent
Political offices
Preceded by Mike DeWine	Governor of Ohio; Taking office 2027	Elect
