= David Pepper (politician) =

American politician (born 1971)

- Pepper in 2026

Lieutenant Governor-elect of Ohio
- Assuming office January 11, 2027
- Governor: Amy Acton (elect)
- Succeeding: Jim Tressel

Chair of the Ohio Democratic Party
- In office January 1, 2015 – December 31, 2020
- Preceded by: Chris Redfern
- Succeeded by: Elizabeth Walters

Member of the Hamilton County Commission from the 1st district
- In office January 3, 2007 – January 3, 2011
- Preceded by: Phil Heimlich
- Succeeded by: Chris Monzel

Personal details
- Born: David Andrew Pepper; June 7, 1971 (age 55) Cincinnati, Ohio, U.S.
- Party: Democratic
- Spouse: Alana Swartz
- Parent: John E. Pepper Jr. (father)
- Education: Yale University (BA, JD)
- Website: Official website

David Andrew Pepper (born June 7, 1971) is an American politician and writer who is the lieutenant governor-elect of Ohio. Pepper was chairman of the Ohio Democratic Party from 2015 through 2020, a former councilman for the city of Cincinnati, and a former member of the Hamilton County, Ohio board of commissioners. He is the author of several publications regarding efforts to preserve democracy in the United States.

In January 2026, Democratic gubernatorial candidate Amy Acton chose him as her running mate for that year's election.

== Early life ==
David Andrew Pepper was born on June 7, 1971, in Cincinnati, Ohio. Pepper is the son of former Procter & Gamble CEO John Pepper Jr. Pepper graduated from Cincinnati Country Day School, earned his B.A. at Yale University, and his J.D. from Yale Law School. He specialized in commercial litigation for the Blank Rome firm.

== Career ==
=== Political career ===
In 2001, Pepper was elected to the Cincinnati city council and served as the chairman of council's Law and Public Safety Committee. Pepper was defeated in his run for mayor in 2005.

Pepper was elected to the Hamilton County Board of Commissioners in November 2006. In 2010, Pepper was a candidate for Ohio Auditor, and in April 2013, Pepper said he would run for state Attorney General in the 2014 election. In 2014, Pepper ran unsuccessfully for Ohio Attorney General. He was elected chairman of the Ohio Democratic Party in 2015. He has taught voting rights at University of Cincinnati School of Law.

After the 2020 elections, Pepper announced that he would step down as Ohio Democratic Party Chairman at the end of the year.

Pepper was a senior fellow at the Kettering Foundation, an American non-partisan research foundation from 2024-2025.

=== Writing career ===
Pepper is the author of the 2016 political thriller novel The People's House. The book centers around a Russian scheme to help elect Republican candidates. The Wall Street Journal wrote that Pepper "writes with flair and insider knowledge of everything from gerrymandering to arrogant D.C. press aides" and "With speed and savvy, 'The People's House' emerges as a sleeper candidate for political thriller of the year". Bill Clinton said of Pepper's 2020 novel The Voter File: "Pepper comes through again with this clever tale of how cyber sabotage of elections, coupled with highly concentrated ownership of traditional media operations, can undermine American democracy".

Around 2002, Pepper was kidnapped and robbed at gunpoint. He wrote a novel entitled The Fifth Vote in 2023 based upon that experience.

Writing in 2022 for Salon, Paul Rosenberg called Pepper's 2021 work Laboratories of Autocracy "arguably the most important [book]" among the "booming literature on the erosion of democracy in America" and stated that the book "brings the subject down to earth, connects democratic erosion to corruption and the decline in America's quality of life, and provides a wealth of ideas about how to fight back to protect democracy". Pepper emphasizes these potential solutions in a Substack publication he has named "Pepperspectives", such as "'2025': Anticipating What's Coming ...In Order to Stop the Worst of It" on November 8, 2024 and in interviews by political commentators concerned about protecting democracy, such as "Happy Hour 181 - Texas In The Second Trump Era" by Progress Texas in late 2024.

== Works ==
- The People's House. St. Helena Press. 2016. ISBN 978-1619845121.
- The Wingman. St. Helena Press. 2018. ISBN 978-1619848719.
- The Voter File. G. P. Putnam's Sons. 2020. ISBN 978-0593083932.
- Laboratories of Autocracy: A Wake-Up Call from Behind the Lines. 2021. ISBN 978-1662919572.
- The Fifth Vote. St. Helena Press. October 2, 2023.

== Electoral history ==
| Date | Position | Status | Opponent | Result | Vote share | Opponent vote share |
|---|---|---|---|---|---|---|
| 2026 | Lieutenant Governor | Open-Seat | Rob McColley | Elected | 52.3% | 44.4% |
| 2014 | Attorney General | Challenger | Mike DeWine | Defeated | 38.5% | 61.5% |
| 2010 | Auditor | Open-Seat | Dave Yost | Defeated | 44.9% | 50.2% |
| 2006 | County Commissioner | | Phil Heimlich | Elected | 53.0% | 47.0% |
| 2005 | Mayor | Open-Seat | Mark Mallory | Defeated | 47.9% | 52.0% |
| 2001 | City Council | | | Elected | | |

Party political offices
| Preceded by Barbara Sykes | Democratic nominee for Auditor of Ohio; 2010 | Succeeded by John Patrick Carney |
| Preceded by Richard Cordray | Democratic nominee for Attorney General of Ohio; 2014 | Succeeded by Steve Dettelbach |
| Preceded by Chris Redfern | Chair of the Ohio Democratic Party; 2015–2020 | Succeeded by Elizabeth Walters |
| Preceded by Cheryl Stephens | Democratic nominee for Lieutenant Governor of Ohio; 2026 | Most recent |
Political offices
| Preceded by Jim Tressel | Lieutenant Governor of Ohio; Taking office 2027 | Elect |
