= 2024 Ohio Senate election =

- November 5, 2024

16 of the 33 seats in the Ohio Senate 17 seats needed for a majority

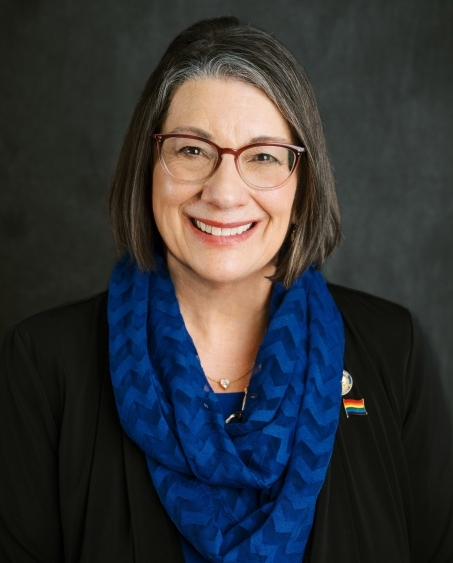
	Majority party	Minority party
Leader	Rob McColley	Nickie Antonio
Party	Republican	Democratic
Leader since	January 3, 2023	January 3, 2023
Leader's seat	1st–Napoleon	23rd–Lakewood
Last election	11 seats, 57.43%	6 seats, 42.23%
Seats before	26	7
Seats won	13	3
Seats after	24	9
Seat change	▼2	▲2
Popular vote	2,914,102	1,106,983
Percentage	62.01%	37.99%
Swing	▲0.51	▲0.54
- Republican hold Democratic hold Democratic gain No election 50–60% 60–70% 70–80% >90% 50–60% 60–70%
President of the Senate before election
Matt Huffman
Republican
Elected President of the Senate
Rob McColley
Republican

The 2024 Ohio Senate election was held on November 5, 2024, to elect senators in 16 even-numbered districts of the Ohio Senate. Members were elected in single-member constituencies to four-year terms. In addition, there was a special election in District 33 for the remainder of that district's term ending in 2026. These elections were held concurrently with various federal and state elections, including for U.S. president and U.S. Senate.

== Predictions ==
Source	Ranking	As of
CNalysis	Solid R	February 29, 2024

== Overview ==
Party	Candidates	Votes			Seats				
Party	Candidates	No.	%	+/-	Before	Up	Won	After	+/–
Republican	17	2,914,102	62.01	▲0.51	26	16	14	24	▼2
Democratic	16	1,106,983	37.99	▲0.54	7	1	3	9	▲2
Total			100.00		33	17			

=== Close races ===
Seats where the margin of victory was under 10%:

1. District 18, 8.12%
2. District 24, 7.04%
3. District 6, 3.98% (gain)

== Outgoing incumbents ==
=== Republicans ===
- District 6: Niraj Antani was retiring to run for Ohio's 2nd congressional district.
- District 10: Bob Hackett was term-limited.
- District 12: Matt Huffman was term-limited.
- District 16: Stephanie Kunze was term-limited.
- District 24: Matt Dolan was term-limited.

=== Democrats ===
- District 28: Vernon Sykes was term-limited.

== Summary results ==
District	Incumbent status	Incumbent	Winner	Result
2nd	Running	Theresa Gavarone		Incumbent Republican re-elected
4th	Running	George Lang		Incumbent Republican re-elected
6th	Not running	Niraj Antani	Willis Blackshear Jr.	Democratic gain
8th	Running	Louis Blessing		Incumbent Republican re-elected
10th	Term-limited	Bob Hackett	Kyle Koehler	Republican hold
12th	Term-limited	Matt Huffman	Susan Manchester	Republican hold
14th	Running	Terry Johnson		Incumbent Republican re-elected
16th	Term-limited	Stephanie Kunze	Beth Liston	Democratic gain
18th	Running	Jerry Cirino		Incumbent Republican re-elected
20th	Running	Tim Schaffer		Incumbent Republican re-elected
22nd	Running	Mark Romanchuk		Incumbent Republican re-elected
24th	Term-limited	Matt Dolan	Tom Patton	Republican hold
26th	Running	Bill Reineke		Incumbent Republican re-elected
28th	Term-limited	Vernon Sykes	Casey Weinstein	Democratic hold
30th	Running	Brian Chavez		Incumbent Republican re-elected
32nd	Running	Sandra O'Brien		Incumbent Republican re-elected
33rd	Running	Alessandro Cutrona		Incumbent Republican re-elected

== District 2 ==
Ohio's 2nd senatorial district has historically represented areas located in northwestern Ohio. It now stretches along the Great Lakes. A multi-county district, it currently comprises Erie, Ottawa and Wood counties, as well as portions of Fulton and Lucas counties. It encompasses Ohio House of Representatives districts 3, 47 and 89. It had a Cook PVI of R+1. The seat had been held by Theresa Gavarone following her appointment in February 2019. She was re-elected in 2024.

=== Republican primary ===
==== Declared ====
- Theresa Gavarone, incumbent state senator

==== Results ====
Republican primary results
Party	Candidate	Votes	%
Republican	Theresa Gavarone (incumbent)	27,969	100.0
Total votes		27,969	100.0

=== Democratic primary ===
==== Declared ====
- Paloma De La Fuente, student (write-in)

==== Results ====
Democratic primary results
Party	Candidate	Votes	%
Democratic	Paloma De La Fuente	699	100.0
Total votes		699	100.0

=== General election ===
==== Results ====
General election results
Party	Candidate	Votes	%
Republican	Theresa Gavarone (incumbent)	111,096	61.7%
Democratic	Paloma De La Fuente	68,948	38.3%
Total votes		180,044	100%

== District 4 ==
Ohio's 4th senatorial district has been based in southwestern Ohio and now consists of almost all of Butler County. It encompasses Ohio House of Representatives districts 51, 52 and 53. It had a Cook PVI of R+13. The incumbent Ohio senator was Republican George Lang. He was re-elected in 2024.

=== Republican primary ===
==== Declared ====
- Candice Keller, former state representative from the 53rd district (2016–2020)
- George Lang, incumbent state senator
- Mark Morgan

==== Endorsements ====
George Lang

Organizations

- Americans for Prosperity
- National Federation of Independent Business
- Ohio Right to Life

==== Results ====
Republican primary results
Party	Candidate	Votes	%
Republican	George Lang (incumbent)	19,773	60.2
Republican	Candice Keller	8,971	27.3
Republican	Mark Morgan	4,108	12.5
Total votes		32,852	100.0

=== Democratic primary ===
==== Declared ====
- Tom Cooke

==== Results ====
Democratic primary results
Party	Candidate	Votes	%
Democratic	Tom Cooke	8,311	100.0
Total votes		8,311	100.0

=== General election ===
==== Results ====
General election results
Party	Candidate	Votes	%
Republican	George Lang (incumbent)	104,251	62.94%
Democratic	Tom Cooke	61,381	37.06%
Total votes		172,632	100%

== District 6 ==
Ohio's 6th senatorial district has always been based in Dayton, Ohio. It consists of about two-thirds of Montgomery County. It encompasses Ohio House districts 40, 41 and 42. It had a Cook PVI of R+9. The incumbent Ohio senator was Republican Niraj Antani. Antani declined to run for State Senate again, as he was running for U.S. representative. Ohio State Board of Education member Charlotte McGuire was nominated as the Republican nominee for the district, and state representative from the 38th district, Willis Blackshear Jr., was nominated as the Democratic nominee. Blackshear flipped the district to the Democratic Party in the 2024 general election.

=== Republican primary ===
==== Declared ====
- Charlotte McGuire, Ohio State Board of Education member

==== Failed to qualify ====
- Ryan Riddell, real estate agent

==== Declined ====
- Niraj Antani, incumbent state senator (running for U.S. representative)

==== Endorsements ====
Charlotte McGuire

State representatives

- Phil Plummer, HD-39 (2023–present), HD-40 (2019–2022)

==== Results ====
Republican primary results
Party	Candidate	Votes	%
Republican	Charlotte McGuire	18,250	100.0
Total votes		18,250	100.0

=== Democratic primary ===
==== Declared ====
- Willis Blackshear Jr., state representative from the 38th district (2023–present) and 39th district (2021–2022)
- Jyl Hall, Kettering city councilwoman and daughter of former U.S. Representative Tony P. Hall
- Jocelyn Rhynard, member of Planned Parenthood of Southwest Ohio board and the Dayton Board of Education

==== Results ====
Democratic primary results
Party	Candidate	Votes	%
Democratic	Willis Blackshear Jr.	10,210	46.1
Democratic	Jocelyn Rhynard	6,844	30.9
Democratic	Jyl Hall	5,077	23.0
Total votes		22,131	100.0

=== General election ===
==== Results ====
General election results
Party	Candidate	Votes	%
Republican	Charlotte McGuire	78,100	48.01%
Democratic	Willis Blackshear Jr.	84,565	51.99%
Total votes		162,665	100%

== District 8 ==
Ohio's 8th senatorial district has been based in Cincinnati, Ohio and currently comprises the western portion of Hamilton County. It encompasses Ohio House districts 28, 29 and 30. It had a Cook PVI of R+14. The incumbent Ohio senator was Republican Louis Blessing. He was re-elected in 2024.

=== Republican primary ===
==== Declared ====
- Louis Blessing, incumbent state senator

==== Declined ====
- Bill Seitz, Majority Leader of the Ohio House of Representatives (2017–present) from the 30th district (2017–present; 2001–2007); former state senator from the 8th district (2007–2016)

==== Results ====
Republican primary results
Party	Candidate	Votes	%
Republican	Louis Blessing (incumbent)	22,739	100.0
Total votes		22,739	100.0

=== Democratic primary ===
==== Declared ====
- Ty Hogan

==== Results ====
Democratic primary results
Party	Candidate	Votes	%
Democratic	Ty Hogan	10,025	100.0
Total votes		10,025	100.0

=== General election ===
==== Results ====
General election results
Party	Candidate	Votes	%
Republican	Louis Blessing (incumbent)	108,346	56.69%
Democratic	Ty Hogan	82,775	43.31%
Total votes		191,121	100%

== District 10 ==
Ohio's 10th senatorial district has been based in south-central Ohio. It comprises the Clark, Greene and Madison counties. It encompasses Ohio House districts 73, 74 and 79. It had a Cook PVI of R+7. The incumbent Ohio senator was Republican Bob Hackett. Hackett did not run for re-election. Former state representative from the 79th district, Kyle Koehler, was nominated as the Republican nominee, and Daniel McGregor was nominated as the Democratic nominee. He was elected in the 2024 general election.

=== Republican primary ===
==== Declared ====
- Carolyn DeStefani, Sugarcreek Township trustee
- Kyle Koehler, former state representative from the 79th district (2015–2022)

==== Endorsements ====
Kyle Koehler

Organizations

- Americans for Prosperity
- National Federation of Independent Business
- Ohio Right to Life

==== Results ====
Republican primary results
Party	Candidate	Votes	%
Republican	Kyle Koehler	24,501	63.7
Republican	Carolyn DeStefani	13,938	36.3
Total votes		38,439	100.0

=== Democratic primary ===
==== Declared ====
- Daniel McGregor

==== Failed to qualify ====
- James Dickerson

==== Results ====
Democratic primary results
Party	Candidate	Votes	%
Democratic	Daniel McGregor	10,329	100.0
Total votes		10,329	100.0

=== General election ===
==== Results ====
General election results
Party	Candidate	Votes	%
Republican	Kyle Koehler	110,150	65.23%
Democratic	Daniel McGregor	58,721	34.77%
Total votes		168,871	100%

== District 12 ==
Ohio's 12th senatorial district has been based in rural western Ohio. It comprises Allen, Mercer, Shelby, Champaign counties, as well as portions of Auglaize, Darke and Logan counties. It encompasses Ohio House districts 4, 84 and 85. It had a Cook PVI of R+14. The incumbent Ohio senator was Republican Matt Huffman. Huffman was term-limited, and state representative from the 78th district, Susan Manchester, was nominated as the Republican nominee. She was elected in the 2024 general election.

=== Republican primary ===
==== Declared ====
- Susan Manchester, state representative from the 78th district (2023–present) and 84th district (2019–2022)

==== Results ====
Republican primary results
Party	Candidate	Votes	%
Republican	Susan Manchester	37,993	100.0
Total votes		37,993	100.0

=== Democratic primary ===
==== Withdrawn ====
- Zulma Schrupp

=== General election ===
==== Results ====
General election results
Party	Candidate	Votes	%
Republican	Susan Manchester	140,219	100%
Total votes		140,219	100%

== District 14 ==
=== Republican primary ===
==== Declared ====
- Terry Johnson, incumbent state senator

==== Results ====
Republican primary results
Party	Candidate	Votes	%
Republican	Terry Johnson (incumbent)	37,457	100.0
Total votes		37,457	100.0

=== Democratic primary ===
==== Declared ====
- Mark Grauwelman
- Shane Marcum

==== Results ====
Democratic primary results
Party	Candidate	Votes	%
Democratic	Shane Marcum	4,149	56.9
Democratic	Mark Grauwelman	3,140	43.1
Total votes		7,289	100.0

=== General election ===
==== Results ====
General election results
Party	Candidate	Votes	%
Republican	Terry Johnson (incumbent)	125,073	72.88%
Democratic	Shane Marcum	46,551	27.12%
Total votes		171,624	100%

== District 16 ==
=== Republican primary ===
==== Declared ====
- Besa Sharrah

==== Results ====
Republican primary results
Party	Candidate	Votes	%
Republican	Besa Sharrah	14,878	100.0
Total votes		14,878	100.0

=== Democratic primary ===
==== Declared ====
- Beth Liston, state representative from the 8th district (2023–present) and 21st district (2019–2022)

==== Results ====
Democratic primary results
Party	Candidate	Votes	%
Democratic	Beth Liston	18,260	100.0
Total votes		18,260	100.0

=== General election ===
==== Results ====
General election results
Party	Candidate	Votes	%
Republican	Besa Sharrah	74,856	39.66%
Democratic	Beth Liston	113,896	60.34%
Total votes		188,752	100%

== District 18 ==
=== Republican primary ===
==== Declared ====
- Jerry Cirino, incumbent state senator

==== Results ====
Republican primary results
Party	Candidate	Votes	%
Republican	Jerry Cirino (incumbent)	25,710	100.0
Total votes		25,710	100.0

=== Democratic primary ===
==== Declared ====
- Chris Callender, Oakwood village councilor
- Katie O'Neill

==== Results ====
Democratic primary results
Party	Candidate	Votes	%
Democratic	Katie O'Neill	10,734	56.05
Democratic	Chris Callender	8,416	43.95
Total votes		19,150	100.0

=== General election ===
==== Results ====
General election results
Party	Candidate	Votes	%
Republican	Jerry Cirino (incumbent)	106,470	54.06%
Democratic	Katie O'Neill	90,464	45.94%
Total votes		196,934	100%

== District 20 ==
=== Republican primary ===
==== Declared ====
- Tim Schaffer, incumbent state senator

==== Results ====
Republican primary results
Party	Candidate	Votes	%
Republican	Tim Schaffer (incumbent)	34,710	100.0
Total votes		34,710	100.0

=== Democratic primary ===
==== Declared ====
- Nick Hubbel

==== Results ====
Democratic primary results
Party	Candidate	Votes	%
Democratic	Nick Hubbel	10,149	100.0
Total votes		10,149	100.0

=== General election ===
==== Results ====
General election results
Party	Candidate	Votes	%
Republican	Tim Schaffer (incumbent)	124,414	67.4%
Democratic	Nick Hubbel	60,184	32.6%
Total votes		184,598	100%

== District 22 ==
=== Republican primary ===
==== Declared ====
- Mark Romanchuk, incumbent state senator

==== Results ====
Republican primary results
Party	Candidate	Votes	%
Republican	Mark Romanchuk (incumbent)	35,231	100.0
Total votes		35,231	100.0

=== Democratic primary ===
==== Declared ====
- Kathy Salem

==== Results ====
Democratic primary results
Party	Candidate	Votes	%
Democratic	Kathy Salem	11,801	100.0
Total votes			

=== General election ===
==== Results ====
General election results
Party	Candidate	Votes	%
Republican	Mark Romanchuk (incumbent)	123,906	68.23%
Democratic	Kathy Salem	57,702	31.77%
Total votes		181,608	100%

== District 24 ==
=== Republican primary ===
==== Declared ====
- Tom Patton, state representative from the 17th district (2023–present), 7th district (2017–2022) and 18th district (2003–2008); former state senator from the 24th district (2008–2016)

==== Results ====
Republican primary results
Party	Candidate	Votes	%
Republican	Tom Patton	18,077	100.0
Total votes		18,077	100.0

=== Democratic primary ===
==== Declared ====
- Sue Durichko, Parma city councilor

==== Results ====
Democratic primary results
Party	Candidate	Votes	%
Democratic	Sue Durichko	18,298	100.0
Total votes		18,298	100.0

=== General election ===
==== Results ====
General election results
Party	Candidate	Votes	%
Republican	Tom Patton	86,812	53.52%
Democratic	Sue Durichko	75,378	46.48%
Total votes		162,190	100%

== District 26 ==
=== Republican primary ===
==== Declared ====
- Bill Reineke, incumbent state senator

==== Results ====
Republican primary results
Party	Candidate	Votes	%
Republican	Bill Reineke (incumbent)	34,166	100.0
Total votes		34,166	100.0

=== Democratic primary ===
==== Declared ====
- Mohamud Jama

==== Results ====
Democratic primary results
Party	Candidate	Votes	%
Democratic	Mohamud Jama	7,081	100.0
Total votes		7,081	100.0

=== General election ===
==== Results ====
General election results
Party	Candidate	Votes	%
Republican	Bill Reineke (incumbent)	124,213	76.15%
Democratic	Mohamud Jama	38,908	23.85%
Total votes		163,121	100%

== District 28 ==
=== Democratic primary ===
==== Declared ====
- Casey Weinstein, state representative from the 34th district (2023–present) and 37th district (2019–2022)

==== Declined ====
- Tavia Galonski, state representative from the 33rd district (2023–present) and 35th district (2017–2022)

==== Endorsements ====
Casey Weinstein

State representatives

- Tavia Galonski, HD-33 (2023–present), HD-35 (2017–2022)

==== Results ====
Democratic primary results
Party	Candidate	Votes	%
Democratic	Casey Weinstein	17,649	100.0
Total votes		17,649	100.0

=== Republican primary ===
==== Declared ====
- Jon Leissler

==== Results ====
Republican primary results
Party	Candidate	Votes	%
Republican	Jon Leissler	16,995	100.0
Total votes		16,995	100.0

=== General election ===
==== Results ====
General election results
Party	Candidate	Votes	%
Democratic	Casey Weinstein	90,414	55.94%
Republican	Jon Leissler	71,224	44.06%
Total votes		161,638	100%

== District 30 ==
=== Republican primary ===
==== Declared ====
- Brian Chavez, incumbent state senator

==== Results ====
Republican primary results
Party	Candidate	Votes	%
Republican	Brian Chavez (incumbent)	30,411	100.0
Total votes		30,411	100.0

=== Democratic primary ===
==== Declared ====
- Iva Faber

==== Results ====
Democratic primary results
Party	Candidate	Votes	%
Democratic	Iva Faber	11,890	100.0
Total votes		11,890	100.0

=== General election ===
==== Results ====
General election results
Party	Candidate	Votes	%
Republican	Brian Chavez (incumbent)	106,583	69.31%
Democratic	Iva Faber	47,187	30.69%
Total votes		153,770	100%

== District 32 ==
=== Republican primary ===
==== Declared ====
- Mike Loychik, state representative from the 65th district (2023–present) and 63rd district (2021–2022)
- Sandra O'Brien, incumbent state senator

==== Endorsements ====
Sandra O'Brien

State senators

- Rob McColley, Majority Leader of the Ohio Senate (2023–present) from SD-01 (2017–present)

Organizations

- Americans for Prosperity
- Ohio Right to Life

==== Results ====
Republican primary results
Party	Candidate	Votes	%
Republican	Sandra O'Brien (incumbent)	25,292	63.9
Republican	Mike Loychik	14,291	36.1
Total votes		39,583	100.0

=== Democratic primary ===
==== Declared ====
- Michael Shrodek

==== Results ====
Democratic primary results
Party	Candidate	Votes	%
Democratic	Michael Shrodek	17,476	100.0
Total votes		17,476	100.0

=== General election ===
==== Results ====
General election results
Party	Candidate	Votes	%
Republican	Sandra O'Brien (incumbent)	108,695	62.94%
Democratic	Michael Shrodek	63,995	37.06%
Total votes		172,690	100%

== District 33 ==
Special election caused by the resignation of Michael Rulli.

=== Republican primary ===
No primary was held as the Republican candidate was directly nominated by the Carroll, Columbiana, and Mahoning County Republican parties.

=== Democratic primary ===
No primary was held as the Democratic candidate was directly nominated by the Carroll, Columbiana, and Mahoning County Democratic parties.

=== General election ===
==== Results ====
General election results
Party	Candidate	Votes	%
Republican	Alessandro Cutrona (incumbent)	102,711	60.91%
Democratic	Marty Hume	65,914	39.09%
Total votes		168,625	100%

== See also ==
- 2024 Ohio elections
- List of Ohio state legislatures
