= Senator Liston =

Senator Liston may refer to:

- Beth Liston (born 1974), Ohio State Senate
- Larry Liston (born 1952), Colorado State Senate
