= James C. Boland =

American businessman

James C. Boland is an American businessman.

== Early life and education ==
Boland's father comes from Moyasta, County Clare, and his mother, Catherine Monaghan, from Carnaclay, County Mayo, Ireland. He was born in Cleveland, Ohio. He graduated from John Carroll University and received an M.A. from George Washington University. He served as an Officer in the United States Army for two years.

== Career ==
From 1976 to 1998, Boland served as a partner at Ernst & Young, including Vice Chairman and member of its Management Committee. From 1998 to 2002, he served as president and Chief Executive Officer of the Cleveland Cavaliers and the Gund Arena. He served as its Vice Chairman from January 1, 2003 to June 30, 2007.

== Additional affiliations and memberships ==
Boland sits on the boards of directors of the Goodyear Tire and Rubber Company, Invacare and DDR Corp. He has served on the board of the International Steel Group.

He serves as chairman of Jobs Ohio, and on the board of the Center for Global Business Studies in Washington, D.C. He has served on the boards of trustees of the Ohio Business Roundtable, Cleveland Tomorrow, Leadership Cleveland, the Cleveland Health and Education Museum, University Circle Inc., the Hawken School, Bluecoats Drum and Bugle Corps, the Great Lakes Science Center and United Way Services' cabinet, and the Harvard Business School Club of Cleveland.

Boland has served as chairman of the Cleveland Boy Scouts Capital Campaign, the YMCA Corporate Challenge, the March of Dimes "Walka-thon", the Olympic Torch Relay Committee. He has served on the Rain Forest Development Committee. He has chaired benefits for the United Cerebral Palsy, National Multiple Sclerosis Society, Cleveland Sight Center, Alzheimer's Association, the Ethnic Extravaganza for the Neighborhood Centers Association and the Achievement Center of Cleveland.

== Awards and recognitions ==
Boland was named the 2012 Mayo Person of the Year by the Mayo Society of Greater Cleveland.

== Personal life ==
Boland is married to Muffy Boland, and they have six children. One child, Jim Boland, is a partner at Cohen & Company in Cleveland, OH.
