= 2014 Ohio Secretary of State election =

- November 4, 2014
- Registered: 7,748,201
- Turnout: 40.65%
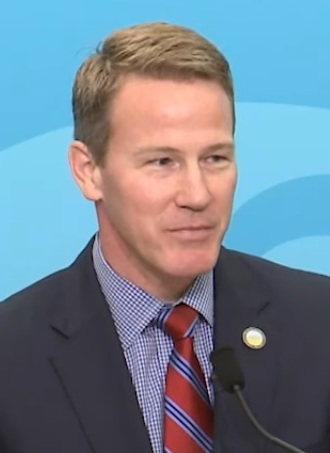

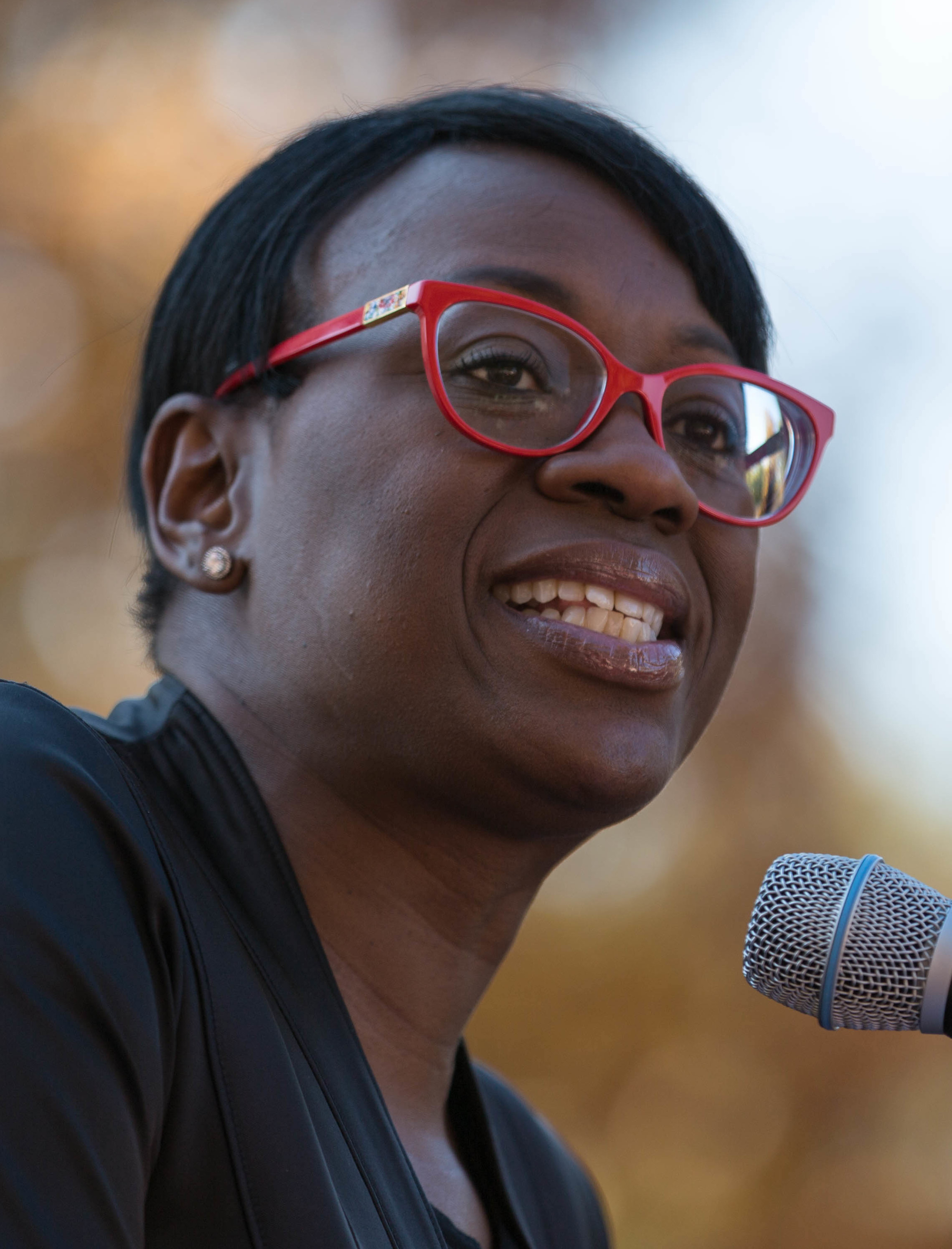
Candidate	Jon Husted	Nina Turner
Party	Republican	Democratic
Popular vote	1,811,020	1,074,475
Percentage	59.83%	35.50%
- Husted: 40–50% 50–60% 60–70% 70–80% 80–90% 90–100% Turner: 40–50% 50–60% 60–70% 70–80% 80–90% 90–100%
Secretary of State before election
Jon Husted
Republican
Elected Secretary of State
Jon Husted
Republican

The 2014 Ohio Secretary of State election was held on November 4, 2014, to elect the Ohio Secretary of State, concurrently with elections to the U.S. House of Representatives, governor, and other state and local elections. Primary elections were held on May 6, 2014.

Incumbent Republican secretary Jon Husted ran for re-election to a second term in office. He defeated Democratic state senator Nina Turner in the general election. Voter fraud, redistricting, and early voting were key issues during the campaign. Turner conceded the race early on November 5.

== Republican primary ==
=== Candidates ===
==== Nominee ====
- Jon Husted, incumbent secretary of state (2011-present), state senator from the 6th district (2009-2011), and state representative from the 41st district (2001-2009)

=== Results ===
Republican primary results
Party	Candidate	Votes	%
Republican	Jon Husted (incumbent)	505,612	100.0%
Total votes		505,612	100.0%

== Democratic primary ==
=== Candidates ===
==== Nominee ====
- Nina Turner, state senator from the 25th district (2008-present) and Cleveland City Council member from Ward 1 (2006-2008)

=== Results ===
Democratic primary results
Party	Candidate	Votes	%
Democratic	Nina Turner	374,834	100.0%
Total votes		374,834	100.0%

== Libertarian primary ==
=== Candidates ===
==== Nominee ====
- Kevin Knedler, chairman of the Libertarian Party of Ohio

=== Results ===
Libertarian primary results
Party	Candidate	Votes	%
Libertarian	Kevin Knedler	774	100.0%
Total votes		774	100.0%

== General election ==
=== Post-primary endorsements ===
Jon Husted (R)

Newspapers and other media

- The Cincinnati Enquirer
Nina Turner (D)

U.S. presidents

- Bill Clinton, President of the United States (1993-2001), former Governor of Arkansas (1983-1992, 1979-1981), and former Attorney General of Arkansas (1977-1979)

U.S. governors

- Howard Dean, chairman of the Democratic National Committee (2005-2009), Governor of Vermont (1991-2003), Lieutenant Governor of Vermont (1987-1991), and state representative from Chittenden 7-4 (1983-1987)

Labor unions

- United Steelworkers District 1

Newspapers and other media

- Cincinnati CityBeat
- Northeast Ohio Media Group
- The Plain Dealer

Organizations

- Democracy for America

=== Polling ===
Poll source	Date(s) administered	Sample size	Margin of error	Jon Husted (R)	Nina Turner (D)	Kevin Knedler (L)	Undecided
The Columbus Dispatch	October 22–31, 2014	1,009	± 3.3%	58%	37%	—	5%
The Columbus Dispatch	September 3–12, 2014	1,185	± 2.7%	49%	35%	4%	12%
Buckeye Poll	August 31, 2014	600	± 4%	30%	25%	—	45%
Public Policy Polling	August 8–9, 2014	801 LV	± 3.5%	46%	43%	—	11%
Public Policy Polling	July 9–10, 2014	889 RV	± 3.3%	45%	42%	—	13%
Public Policy Polling	August 16–19, 2013	551 RV	± 4.2%	37%	36%	—	28%

=== Results ===
2014 Ohio Secretary of State election
Party	Candidate	Votes	%
Republican	Jon Husted (incumbent)	1,811,020	59.83%
Democratic	Nina Turner	1,074,475	35.50%
Libertarian	Kevin Knedler	141,292	4.67%
Total votes		3,026,787	100.00%
Republican hold			
