= Seth Morgan (politician) =

American politician

Member of the Ohio House of Representatives from the 36th district
- In office January 5, 2009 - December 31, 2010
- Preceded by: Arlene Setzer
- Succeeded by: Michael Henne

Personal details
- Born: February 26, 1978 (age 48) Presque Isle, Maine
- Party: Republican
- Education: Park College, University of Dayton
- Profession: Accountant

Seth Morgan (born February 26, 1978) is a former Republican member of the Ohio House of Representatives, who represented the 36th District from 2009 to 2010.

== Ohio House of Representatives ==
A former member of the Huber Heights City Council, Morgan made a run for the Ohio House of Representatives in 2008, following term limits for incumbent Arlene Setzer.

He was sworn into his first term on January 5, 2009, in a new Democratic controlled House. A year later, Morgan declared himself as a candidate for Ohio Auditor of State and was favored by many members of the Tea Party movement in Ohio. He was defeated by Delaware County Prosecutor David Yost. He was succeeded by Michael Henne.

Morgan was mentioned as a potential successor to Secretary of State Jon Husted, once Husted vacated his seat in the Ohio Senate. However, the seat went to Peggy Lehner. Morgan went to the Ohio Supreme Court to get school-funding records from the administration of Democratic Gov. Ted Strickland, who turned over thousands of pages of documents. Nothing of substance was done with these documents.

On May 16, 2011, Ohio Governor John Kasich named Morgan as a member of the Ohio Retirement Study Council.
