= Senator Holcomb =

Senator Holcomb may refer to:

- David Holcomb (fl. 1960s–1970s), Ohio State Senate
- Marcus H. Holcomb (1844–1932), Connecticut State Senate
