= Phil Plummer =

American politician

Member of the Ohio House of Representatives
- Incumbent
- Assumed office January 2023
- Preceded by: Willis Blackshear Jr.
- Constituency: 39th district
- In office January 3, 2019 – January 2023
- Preceded by: Michael Henne
- Succeeded by: Rodney Creech
- Constituency: 40th district

Personal details
- Born: Montgomery County, Ohio, U.S.
- Party: Republican
- Education: University of Toledo (AA); University of Phoenix (BS)

Philip Plummer Jr. is a Republican member of the Ohio House of Representatives, representing the 39th House District. Plummer also serves as the Chairman of the Montgomery County Republican Party. Plummer previously served as Sheriff of Montgomery County, Ohio from 2008 to 2018.

== Early Career ==
Plummer joined the Montgomery County Sheriff's office in 1988 as a corrections officer, was later promoted to Deputy Sheriff, and eventually earned the rank of Sergeant. In November 2000, he was promoted to the rank of Major. In January 2004, he was placed in charge of the Personnel Office. In March 2005, he was promoted to Chief Deputy. Following the resignation of Sheriff David Vore in 2008, Plummer was appointed to the office to fill out the remainder of the term.

Plummer spends his spare time as an assistant coach for the Butler High School wrestling team.

== Montgomery County Ohio Sheriff's Office ==
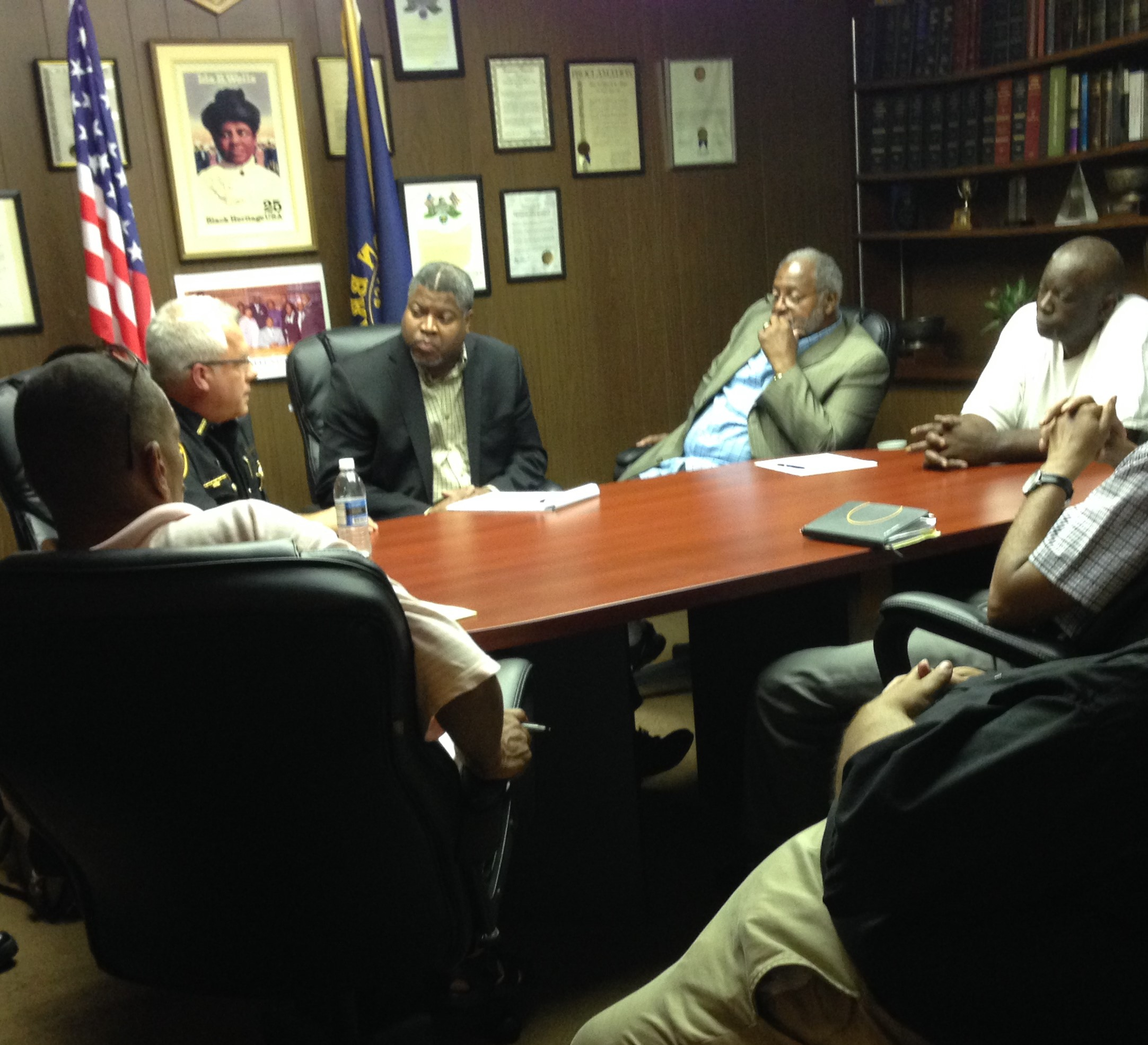
Sheriff Plummer at the NAACP Dayton Headquarters in 2015

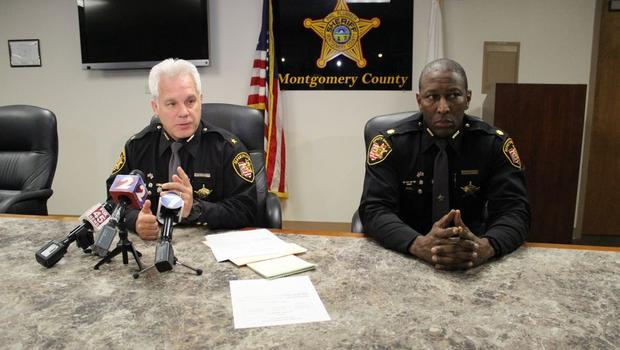
Sheriff Plummer and Major Daryl Wilson hold a press conference in 2015

In 2014, Dr. Derrick L. Foward, President of the Dayton Unit of the National Association for the Advancement of Colored People NAACP, filed a complaint on behalf of the Citizens of Montgomery County, Ohio against 6 Sheriff Deputies who were participating in racially motivated text conversations that contained derogatory jokes and threats to the African American community in Dayton, and abroad. Sheriff Phil Plummer and Major Daryl Wilson met with Foward at the Dayton Unit NAACP office to discuss the issue. As a result of this complaint, Capt. Tom Flanders was terminated. Detective Mike Sollenberger was terminated. Deputy Joseph Connelly received a 30-day suspension, Deputy Jamie Horton received a 10-day suspension and Sgt. Brian Lewis received a 3-day suspension. Detective Brad Daugherty was not disciplined for his role in the text message case.

Public reporting on the investigation focused on internal discipline within the Sheriff's Office; no federal civil rights charges were filed in connection with the text message case.

== Ohio House of Representatives ==
In the 2018 Election, incumbent for the 40th District, Michael Henne was unable to run again due to term limits. Plummer decided to run and won an uncontested primary to become the Republican nominee. He then beat Ryan Taylor. On December 31, 2018, Plummer resigned as Sheriff in order to be sworn in on January 3, 2019, as State Representative.

In 2019, Plummer co-sponsored legislation that would ban abortion in Ohio and criminalize what they called "abortion murder". Doctors who performed abortions in cases of ectopic pregnancy and other life-threatening conditions would be exempt from prosecution only if they "[took] all possible steps to preserve the life of the unborn child, while preserving the life of the woman. Such steps include, if applicable, attempting to reimplant an ectopic pregnancy into the woman's uterus". Reimplantation of an ectopic pregnancy is not a recognized or medically feasible procedure.

=== Committee assignments ===
- Finance
- General Government
- Judiciary
- Public Safety
- Rules and Reference

=== Electoral history ===
Election results
Year	Office	Election	Votes for Plummer	%	Opponent	Party	Votes	%
2008	Sheriff of Montgomery County, Ohio	General	152,537	59.44%	Mike Tenore		104,051	40.55%
2012	Sheriff of Montgomery County, Ohio	General	178,029	100%				
2016	Sheriff of Montgomery County, Ohio	General	182,058	100%				
2018	Ohio House of Representatives	General	27,388	61.81%	Ryan Rebecca Taylor	Democrat	16,924	38.19%
2020	Ohio House of Representatives	General	38,318	65.10%	Leronda Jackson	Democrat	20,543	34.90%
2022	Ohio House of Representatives	General	24,805	55.74%	Leronda Jackson	Democrat	19,694	44.26%
2024	Ohio House of Representatives	General			Dion Green	Democrat		

== Political Career ==
=== House Bill 6 and related energy legislation ===
==== 2019 nuclear and coal subsidy law (HB 6, 133rd General Assembly) ====
In 2019, Plummer voted in favor of House Bill 6, which created state subsidies for two nuclear plants, required ratepayers to fund two coal plants operated by the Ohio Valley Electric Corporation (OVEC), and reduced statewide renewable energy and energy-efficiency requirements. The bill passed the Ohio House on July 23, 2019.

Federal prosecutors later described the House Bill 6 scheme as the largest public corruption case in Ohio history, following the indictment and conviction of former House Speaker Larry Householder in connection with the law.

Plummer's vote in favor of HB 6 aligned with the majority of the Ohio House Republican caucus during final passage of the legislation.

See Ohio nuclear bribery scandal.

==== Campaign contributions ====
News coverage during the debates over repealing House Bill 6 identified Plummer as one of several lawmakers whose campaign committees received contributions during the period surrounding the 2019 energy law.

==== 2021 partial repeal of HB 6 (HB 128, 134th General Assembly) ====
Plummer voted in favor of House Bill 128 on March 10, 2021. HB 128 repealed the HB 6 nuclear subsidy program and eliminated the “decoupling” mechanism that had guaranteed FirstEnergy a set revenue floor, while leaving the HB 6 coal subsidies in place.
