= Terry Blair (politician) =

American politician (1946–2014)

Terrence L. "Terry" Blair

Member of the Ohio House of Representatives from the 42nd district
- In office January 5, 2009 - June 26, 2014
- Preceded by: John White
- Succeeded by: Niraj Antani

Personal details
- Born: November 23, 1946 LaPorte, Indiana, U.S.
- Died: June 26, 2014 (aged 67) Dayton, Ohio, U.S.
- Party: Republican
- Education: University of Notre Dame, Loyola University
- Profession: Small Business Owner

Terrence L. "Terry" Blair (November 23, 1946 – June 26, 2014) was a member of the Ohio House of Representatives, serving the 38th District from 2009 to 2014.

== Career ==
A graduate of Notre Dame and Loyola, Blair formerly served as a Washington Township trustee. He also served as the President of Buckeye Pools, Incorporated before retiring

== Ohio House of Representatives ==
When incumbent Representative John White was term limited, Blair was one of two who sought to replace him. In the 2008 primary, Blair faced Dayton resident Tom Young, and went on to defeat him by 1,400 votes. He went on to easily win the general election, and reelection in 2010. He later served on the committees of Commerce and Labor, Financial Institutions, Housing, and Urban Development, Local Government (as Chairman), and Ways and Means.

Blair won reelection with 65.64% of the vote in 2012 over Democrat Aaron Buczkowski.

== Death ==
On June 26, 2014, it was reported that Blair had died, according to Ohio GOP officials.
