= Michael Henne =

American politician

Member of the Ohio House of Representatives from the 40th district
- In office January 3, 2011 – December 31, 2018
- Preceded by: Seth Morgan
- Succeeded by: Phil Plummer

Personal details
- Born: December 13, 1961 (age 64) Clayton, Ohio, U.S.
- Party: Republican
- Education: Miami University
- Profession: Insurance

Michael Henne (born December 13, 1961) was a member of the Ohio House of Representatives, serving the 40th District from 2011 to 2019.

== Career ==
After graduating from Miami University, Henne went on to found Boord-Henne Insurance Agency where he has worked since 1987.

== Ohio House of Representatives ==
When Representative Seth Morgan decided to seek the office of Ohio Auditor, Henne entered a crowded primary to replace him. In the Republican primary, he faced Butler Township Trustee Joe Ellis. Ellis was originally the party favorite, but due to a fight which broke out among Ellis at a local bar, the party support turned to Henne. In the end, Henne defeated Ellis handily, by almost 4,300 votes. In the general election, Democrats fielded well-known school board member Carl Fisher in an effort to take a pick-up from Republicans. In the end, Henne defeated Fisher easily, by about 12,000 votes.

Henne was sworn into office for his first term on January 3, 2011. Currently, Henne is on the committees of Economic and Small Business Development, Education, Financial Institutions, Housing, and Urban Development, and Insurance.

In 2012, Henne won reelection with 54.46% of the vote over Democrat Carl Fisher.

== Electoral history ==
Election results
Year	Office	Election	Votes for Henne	%	Opponent	Party	Votes	%	Opponent	Party	Votes	%
2010	Ohio House of Representatives	General	26,368	63.27%	Carl D. Fisher Jr.	Democrat	14,078	33.78%	Cheryl K. Watson	Independent	1,230	2.95%
2012	Ohio House of Representatives	General	29,493	54.41%	Carl D. Fisher Jr.	Democrat	24,717	45.59%				
2014	Ohio House of Representatives	General	21,314	65.41%	David L. Richards	Democrat	11,271	34.59%				
2016	Ohio House of Representatives	General	33,750	64.12%	David L. Richards	Democrat	18,887	35.88%				
