= Jon Husted =

American politician (born 1967)

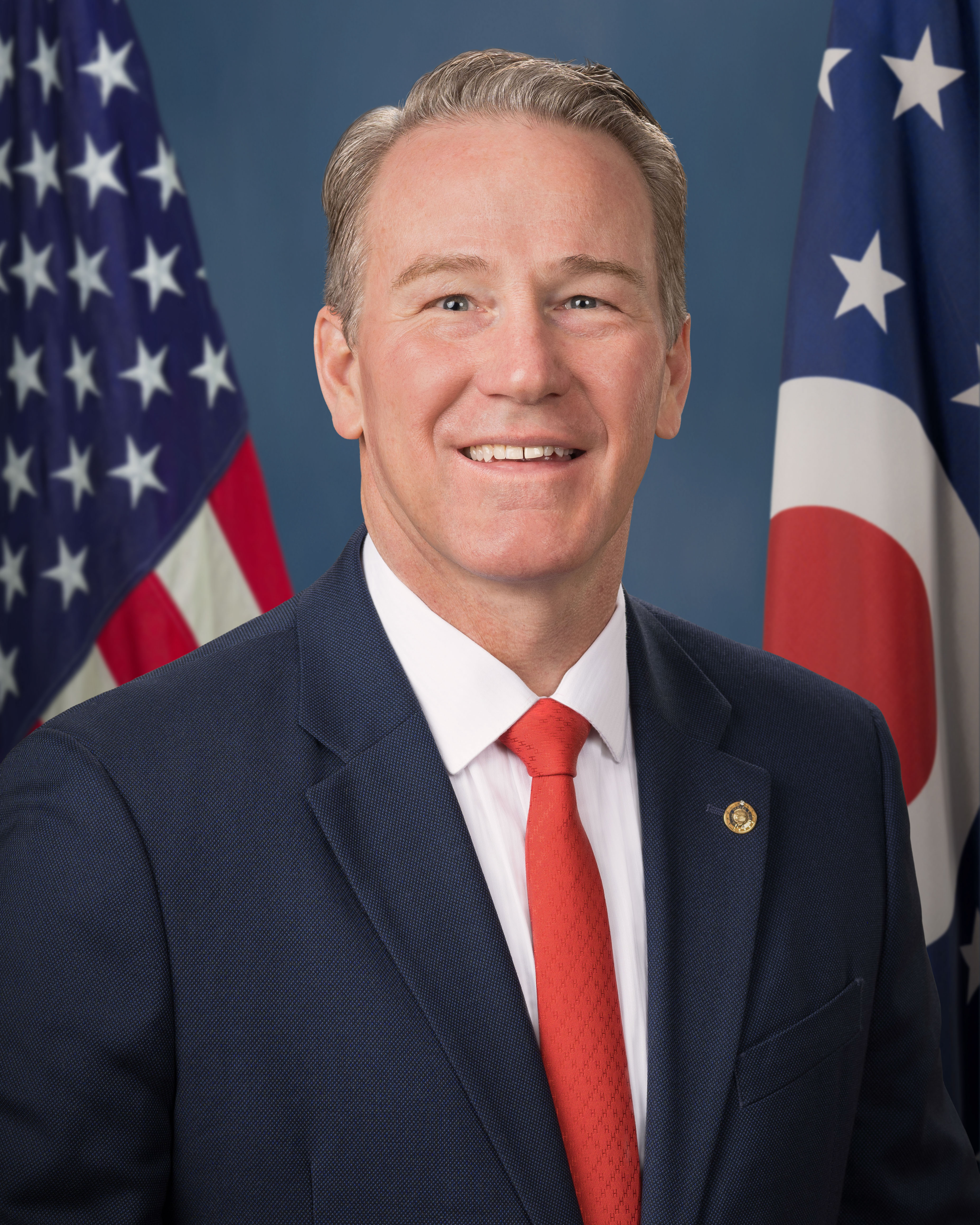
- Official portrait, 2025

United States Senator from Ohio
- Incumbent
- Assumed office January 21, 2025 Serving with Bernie Moreno
- Appointed by: Mike DeWine
- Preceded by: JD Vance

66th Lieutenant Governor of Ohio
- In office January 14, 2019 – January 21, 2025
- Governor: Mike DeWine
- Preceded by: Mary Taylor
- Succeeded by: Jim Tressel

50th Secretary of State of Ohio
- In office January 10, 2011 – January 14, 2019
- Governor: John Kasich
- Preceded by: Jennifer Brunner
- Succeeded by: Frank LaRose

Member of the Ohio Senate from the 6th district
- In office January 5, 2009 – January 9, 2011
- Preceded by: Peggy Lehner
- Succeeded by: Peggy Lehner

99th Speaker of the Ohio House of Representatives
- In office January 3, 2005 – January 4, 2009
- Preceded by: Larry Householder
- Succeeded by: Armond Budish

Member of the Ohio House of Representatives from the 41st district
- In office January 8, 2001 – January 4, 2009
- Preceded by: Don Mottley
- Succeeded by: Peggy Lehner

Personal details
- Born: Jon Allen Husted; August 25, 1967 (age 59) Royal Oak, Michigan, U.S.
- Party: Republican
- Spouse: Tina Zwayer (m. 2006)
- Children: 3
- Education: University of Dayton (BA, MA)
- Website: Senate website Campaign website
- Husted's voice Husted on requiring photo identification to vote Recorded July 27, 2026

Jon Allen Husted (/hjuːstɛd/ HEW-sted; born August 25, 1967) is an American politician serving as the junior United States senator from Ohio since 2025. A member of the Republican Party, he served from 2019 to 2025 as the 66th lieutenant governor of Ohio and from 2011 to 2019 as the 50th Ohio secretary of state.

A graduate of the University of Dayton, Husted began his political career in the Ohio House of Representatives, where he served from 2001 to 2009. During his last four years in the chamber, he was the 99th speaker of the House. He served in the Ohio Senate from 2009 to 2011 before serving as secretary of state. In 2018, Husted launched a campaign for governor of Ohio but withdrew from the Republican primary to join Ohio Attorney General Mike DeWine's ticket as the candidate for lieutenant governor.

On January 17, 2025, Husted was appointed to the U.S. Senate to fill the vacancy left by JD Vance after he became vice president. Husted was sworn in on January 21, 2025, and ran to complete the remainder of Vance's term in the 2026 United States Senate special election in Ohio. He won the Republican nomination in March 2026 and lost to former Senator Sherrod Brown, the Democratic nominee in the general election.

== Early life and education ==
Husted while in high school

Husted was born on August 25, 1967, in Royal Oak, Michigan, a suburb of Detroit. Shortly after his birth, he was put up for adoption, as his biological father did not want him and his biological mother was unable to care for him. He spent months in a Detroit foster home, and was then adopted by James and Judith Husted. He grew up in Montpelier, Ohio, the oldest of three children.

Husted graduated from Montpelier High School in 1985. He earned both a bachelor's degree in education and a master's degree in communication from the University of Dayton. In college, he played on the Dayton Flyers football team, including in 1989, when they won the NCAA Division III football championship.

== Early career ==
While completing his master's degree at the University of Dayton, Husted was offered a job on the football coaching staff at the University of Toledo, but instead chose to work on a local political campaign. He stayed in the Dayton area and worked for Montgomery County Commissioner Don Lucas. He later became Vice President of Business and Economic Development at the Dayton Area Chamber of Commerce, a position he held until running for state representative in 2000.

Husted ran for a seat in the Ohio House of Representatives in 2000 in a five-way race to represent part of Montgomery County (which includes Dayton), defeating his closest opponent by more than 10% of the vote. He went on to serve as speaker of the Ohio House for several years until January 2009, when he became a state senator representing a larger part of Montgomery County.

During his time in the state legislature, Husted led passage of the largest income tax cut in Ohio history at the time. He also supported legislation that expanded school choice.

== Secretary of State of Ohio (2011–2019) ==
Husted was elected Ohio Secretary of State in 2010, defeating Democratic nominee Maryellen O'Shaughnessy by nearly 500,000 votes. He was reelected in 2014, defeating Democratic nominee Nina Turner by over 700,000 votes.

=== Financial management ===
During his tenure as Ohio Secretary of State, Husted reduced the office's budget by $14.5 million and eliminated the jobs of approximately one-third of its staff. The office had operated with a surplus for several years, and Husted grew that surplus. In 2016, he requested that his office receive no taxpayer funding for the remainder of his term and instead use existing funds.

=== Election administration ===
As Ohio's chief elections official, Husted oversaw election administration policies including early voting schedules and rules governing absentee and provisional ballots. Voting rights groups, including the American Civil Liberties Union of Ohio, criticized some of these policies as restrictive and challenged them in court.

Shortly after taking office, Husted set uniform days and hours for early voting across the state, replacing a system that had allowed county boards of elections to set their own schedules. According to the Cleveland Plain Dealer, Husted said the change was intended to ensure that voters were treated consistently across the state. Democratic officials, including Ohio Democratic Party chairman Chris Redfern, criticized the change and said it could reduce access in some areas, while Republican officials said the directive provided adequate early voting opportunities.

In March 2016, the ACLU of Ohio sent Husted's office a letter about whether 17-year-olds who would turn 18 by the general election could vote in the presidential primary. The issue was subsequently litigated, and on March 11, an Ohio judge ruled that such voters could participate in the primary.

Husted was the defendant in litigation over Ohio's voter roll maintenance practices. In Husted v. Randolph Institute, the Supreme Court of the United States ruled 5–4 in favor of Ohio's procedures.

=== Business services ===
Husted partnered with Google's "Get Your Business Online" initiative to provide digital resources for small businesses. The business registration fee fell from $125 to $99.

In 2015, the secretary of state's office closed its in-house business call center and contracted services to the Cleveland Sight Center.

=== Opposition to pay-to-play for school extra-curricular activities ===
Husted expressed opposition to pay-to-participate fees for extracurricular activities in Ohio schools, including sports and band. He supported legislative efforts by State Senator Cliff Hite to restrict school districts' ability to charge participation fees, though the legislation did not advance.

== Lieutenant Governor of Ohio (2019–2025) ==
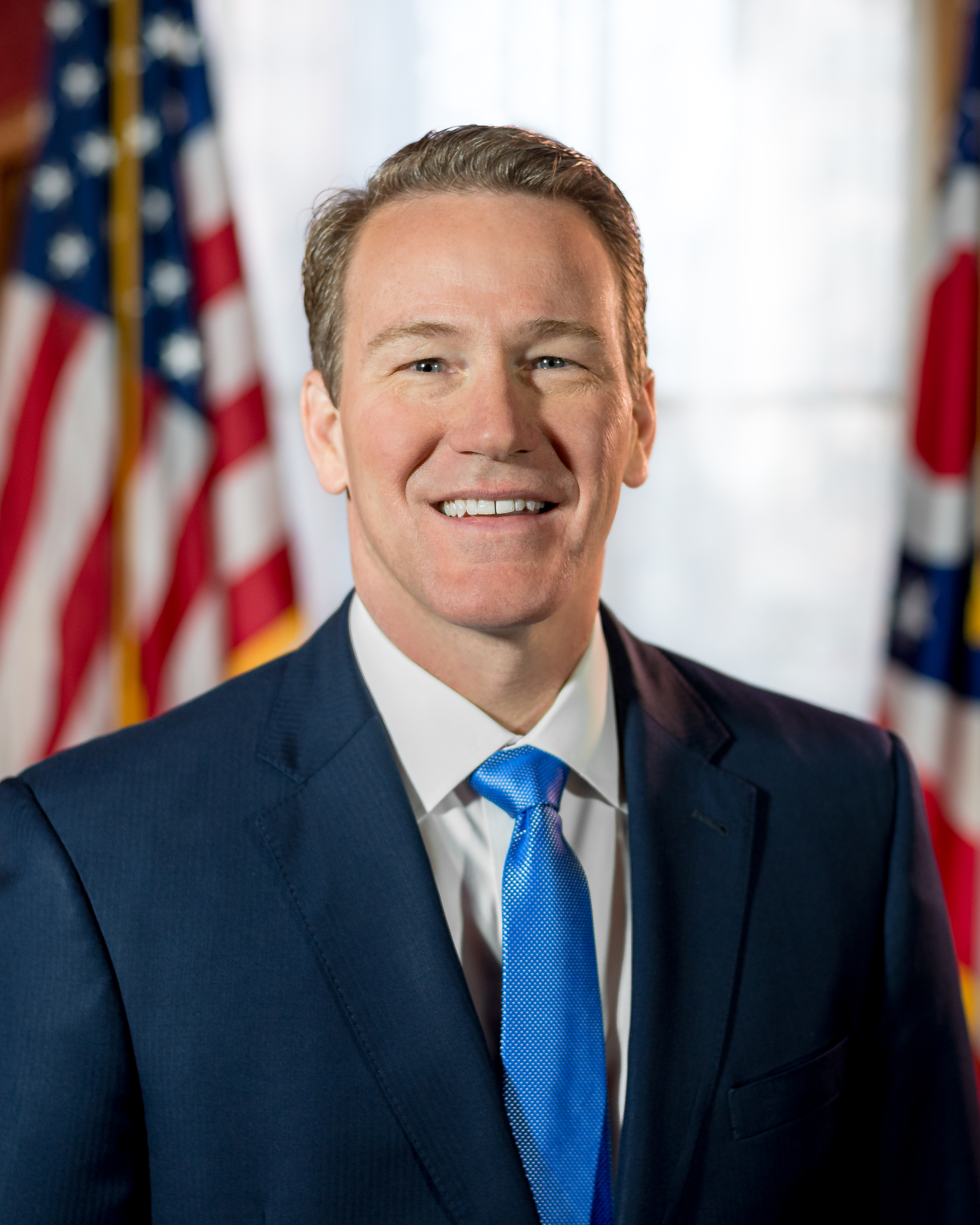
Husted's official lieutenant governor portrait taken in 2018

Husted ran in the Republican primary to succeed John Kasich as governor of Ohio. In November 2017, he ended his campaign and became Mike DeWine's running mate. After winning, DeWine announced that Husted would lead the newly created InnovateOhio to reduce bureaucracy. DeWine later said the project identified about five million words to delete from the state regulatory code.

In January 2021, Senator Rob Portman announced that he would not seek reelection, and Husted was considered a potential candidate. He later said he would not seek the seat.

In July 2024, Husted nominated Senator JD Vance for vice president at the 2024 Republican National Convention.

=== Ohio FirstEnergy bribery case ===
In March 2026, Husted was involved in litigation regarding the FirstEnergy bribery scandal, which did not involve any charges of wrongdoing against him. He testified for the defense in the criminal trial of former FirstEnergy executives Chuck Jones and Michael Dowling related to the Ohio FirstEnergy bribery scandal, the largest corruption case in Ohio history. Testifying remotely, Husted said he was present at a dinner meeting in 2018 with then governor-elect DeWine and two FirstEnergy executives who were later indicted in a $60 million bribery scheme to pass House Bill 6, which provided $500 million in state bailout funds for nuclear and coal power plants.

In 2017, FirstEnergy had donated $1 million earmarked "Husted campaign" to Freedom Frontier, a 501(c)(4) nonprofit organization that does not disclose its donors. A Husted spokesperson said that the campaign had not received the donation. FirstEnergy also donated $2.5 million to a dark-money nonprofit, State Solutions, that supported Husted's and DeWine's 2018 campaigns.

The FirstEnergy scandal led to a 20-year sentence for former Ohio House of Representatives speaker Larry Householder and charges for three others involved in bribery in 2021. Husted's 2026 testimony was part of a related trial of FirstEnergy executives that resulted in a mistrial in March 2026 and is scheduled for retrial in September 2026.

== U.S. Senate (2025–present) ==
=== Appointment ===
On January 17, 2025, Governor DeWine announced his appointment of Husted to the U.S. Senate seat vacated by JD Vance following his resignation to serve as vice president of the United States. Husted had originally declined the potential appointment and intended to run for governor in 2026.

=== 2026 special election ===
Husted ran in the November 2026 special election to serve the remainder of Vance's U.S. Senate term and lost to former U.S. Senator Sherrod Brown. 50% to 45%

=== Tenure ===
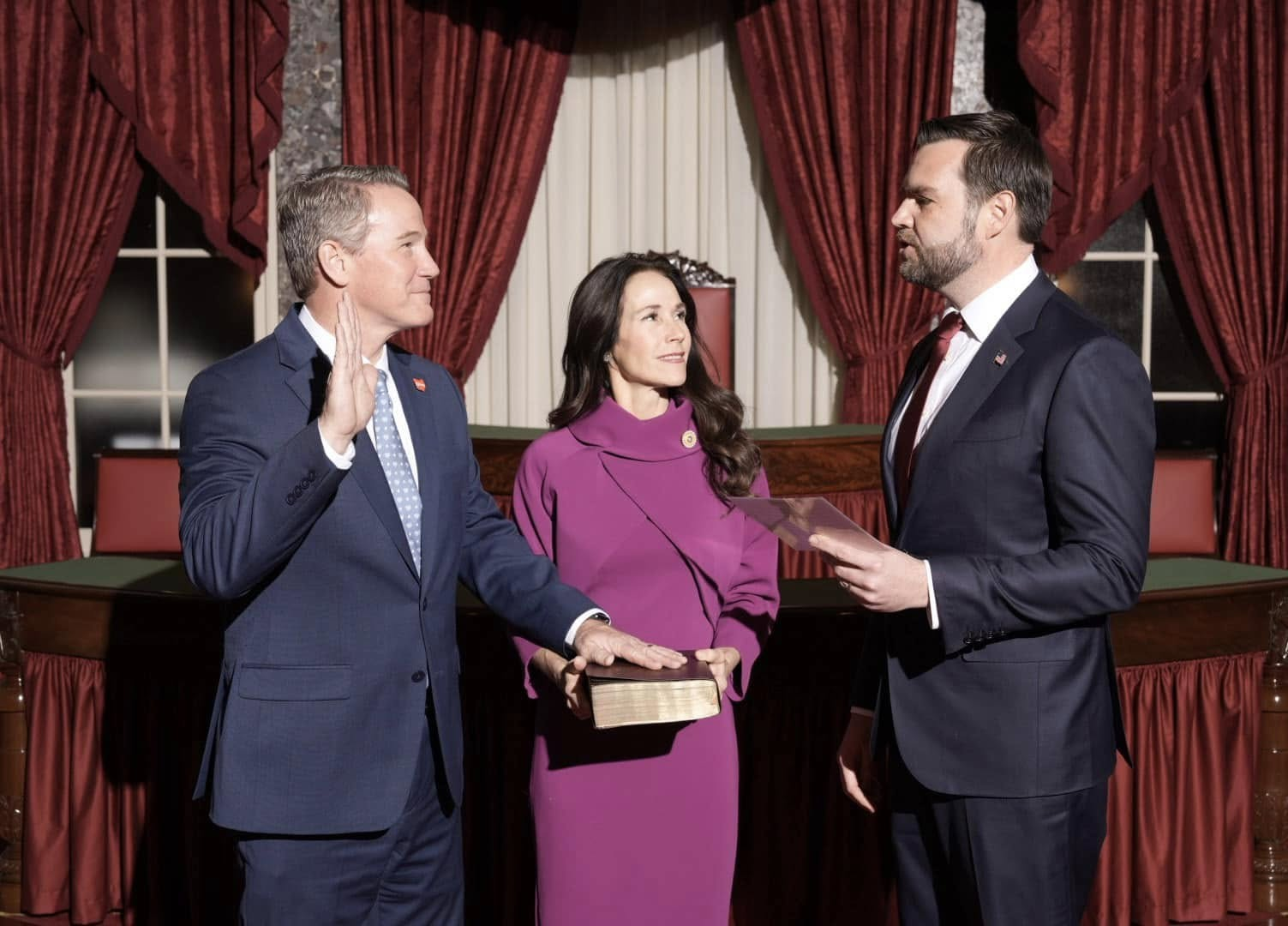
Husted being sworn into office by his predecessor, Vice President JD Vance.

On January 21, 2025, Husted and former Florida Attorney General Ashley Moody were sworn in by Vice President JD Vance. Husted was escorted by DeWine and fellow Ohio Senator Bernie Moreno. His appointment lasts until a special election in November 2026.

==== Federal appliance efficiency rule repeal ====
In 2025, Husted sponsored a Congressional Review Act resolution to repeal a Biden administration rule related to energy efficiency standards for household appliances. The rule, issued by the U.S. Department of Energy in 2024, established updated certification, labeling, and enforcement requirements for various appliances, including air conditioners, washing machines, and pool heaters.

The resolution passed the U.S. House of Representatives in March 2025 and the U.S. Senate in April, and was signed into law in May by Donald Trump. The repeal eliminated federal requirements for certification and labeling tied to the rule, as well as associated compliance and reporting obligations for manufacturers.

Supporters of the repeal, including Husted, argued that the rule imposed unnecessary regulatory burdens on manufacturers and could increase costs for consumers. Opponents contended that removing the requirements could weaken federal energy efficiency standards and reduce long-term consumer savings associated with more efficient appliances.

=== Committee assignments ===
Husted was assigned to the following committees for the 2025–2026 term:

- Committee on Aging (Special)
- Committee on Environment and Public Works
  - Subcommittee on Chemical Safety, Waste Management, Environmental Justice, and Regulatory Oversight
  - Subcommittee on Clean Air, Climate, and Nuclear Innovation and Safety
  - Subcommittee on Fisheries, Wildlife, and Water
- Committee on Health, Education, Labor, and Pensions
  - Subcommittee on Education and the American Family
  - Subcommittee on Employment and Workplace Safety
  - Subcommittee on Primary Health and Retirement Security
- Committee on Small Business and Entrepreneurship

== Political positions ==
=== AI policy ===
As lieutenant governor from 2019 to 2025, Husted backed millions of dollars in tax breaks for data center construction projects in Ohio. He supports data centers, saying they bring new jobs and money to rural areas. During his time as lieutenant governor, he focused on recruiting them to the state, and The Plain Dealer called him Ohio's "Face of Data Centers". During the 2026 campaign, he favored progressively replacing human jobs with AI.

=== Education ===
Husted has supported school choice policies in Ohio, including charter schools that extend access to private and religious educational institutions.

Husted was among Ohio officials who received campaign contributions from individuals associated with the Electronic Classroom of Tomorrow (ECOT), a large online charter school that later closed amid findings that it had overreported student attendance.

=== Elections ===
As Ohio Secretary of State, Husted described his approach to elections as making it "easy to vote and hard to cheat", and supported policies including standardized early voting hours and voter roll maintenance practices.

His tenure included legal disputes over election procedures, including voter roll maintenance policies that were upheld by the Supreme Court of the United States in Husted v. Randolph Institute.

=== Foreign policy ===
In 2025, Husted supported sanctions against Russia, unless Russia pursued a "lasting peace" with Ukraine.

Husted voted against war powers resolutions intended to limit President Trump's ability to wage the 2026 Iran war without congressional consent.

== Electoral history ==
Election results
Year	Office	Election	Subject	Party	Votes	%	Opponent	Party	Votes	%
2010	Ohio Secretary of State	Primary	Jon Husted	Republican	506,253	67.26	Sandra O'Brien	Republican	246,444	32.74

Election results
Year	Office	Election	Subject	Party	Votes	%	Opponent	Party	Votes	%	Opponent	Party	Votes	%	
2000	Ohio House of Representatives	General	Jon Husted	Republican	24,593	50%	Dick Church, Jr.	Democratic	18,698	38%					*
2002	Ohio House of Representatives	General	Jon Husted	Republican	22,468	64%	Gabrielle Williamson	Democratic	12,403	36%					
2004	Ohio House of Representatives	General	Jon Husted	Republican	36,490	65%	John Shady	Democratic	19,640	35%					
2006	Ohio House of Representatives	General	Jon Husted	Republican	28,339	100%									
2008	Ohio Senate	General	Jon Husted	Republican	103,975	61%	John Doll	Democratic	65,216	39%					
2010	Ohio Secretary of State	General	Jon Husted	Republican	1,973,422	54.04%	Maryellen O'Shaughnessy	Democratic	1,500,648	41.09%	Charlie Earl	Libertarian	179,495	4.87%	
2014	Ohio Secretary of State	General	Jon Husted	Republican	1,811,020	59.83%	Nina Turner	Democratic	1,074,475	35.50%	Kevin Knedler	Libertarian	141,292	4.67%	
2026	U.S. Senator	Primary	Jon Husted	Republican	733,270	100.00%									

*2000 election notes: Richard Hartmann received 3,934 votes, Bryan Carey (L) received 904 votes and Charles Turner (N) received 705 votes.

== Personal life ==
Jon Husted married his wife, Tina, in 2005. They have three children. The Husted family lives in the Columbus-area suburb of Upper Arlington, Ohio.

Political offices
Preceded by Larry Householder	Speaker of the Ohio House of Representatives; 2005–2009	Succeeded by Armond Budish
Preceded by Jennifer Brunner	Secretary of State of Ohio; 2011–2019	Succeeded by Frank LaRose
Preceded by Mary Taylor	Lieutenant Governor of Ohio; 2019–2025	Succeeded by Jim Tressel
Party political offices
Preceded by Greg Hartmann	Republican nominee for Secretary of State of Ohio; 2010, 2014	Succeeded by Frank LaRose
Preceded by Mary Taylor	Republican nominee for Lieutenant Governor of Ohio; 2018, 2022	Succeeded by Rob McColley
Preceded by JD Vance	Republican nominee for U.S. Senator from Ohio (Class 3); 2026	Most recent
U.S. Senate
Preceded by JD Vance	U.S. Senator (Class 3) from Ohio; 2025–present Served alongside: Bernie Moreno	Incumbent
U.S. order of precedence (ceremonial)
Preceded by Jim Justice	Order of precedence of the United States as United States Senator	Succeeded by Ashley Moody
Preceded by Jim Justice	United States senators by seniority 97th	Succeeded by Ashley Moody
