= John White (Ohio politician) =

American politician

Member of the Ohio House of Representatives
- In office January 3, 2001 – December 31, 2008
- Preceded by: Bob Corbin
- Succeeded by: Terry Blair
- Constituency: 42nd district (2001–2003)
- Constituency: 38th district (2003–2008)

Personal details
- Born: April 7, 1959 (age 67) Dayton, Ohio, U.S.
- Party: Republican
- Spouse: Andrea Jacobs
- Children: 3
- Education: Wright State University (BS)

John Joseph White (born April 7, 1959) is an American politician who was a member of the Ohio House of Representatives from 2001 to 2008.

== Early life and education ==
White was born in Dayton, Ohio. He earned a Bachelor of Science in marketing from Wright State University.

== Career ==
White had been active in Republican politics throughout Dayton metropolitan area, serving as chair of the Montgomery County Central Committee, president of the Montgomery County Young Republicans, and as a Montgomery County Republican Party Executive Committee member. Outside of politics, he has worked as a human resources consultant.

=== Ohio House of Representatives ===
After Bob Corbin was unable to run for another term for the 42nd district due to term limits, White ran for election to the Ohio House of Representatives. He obtained the Republican nomination for the 42nd district with 52.36% of the vote in the primary election against Joyce Young, and won the general election against Joe Lacey with 60.9% of the electorate. In 2002, White defeated Nick Gerren in the general election for the 38th district of the Ohio House of Representatives with 64.44% of the vote. He defeated John R. Doll in the 2004 general election for the 38th district of the Ohio House of Representatives with 60.64% of the vote. In 2006, White won the general election for the 38th district of the Ohio House of Representatives against Carolyn Rice with 55.64%.

During his time in the legislature, White served as the chairman of the House Health Committee in the 125th Ohio General Assembly, and as Chairman of the Criminal Justice Committee in the 127th Ohio General Assembly.

Term limits required White to relinquish his seat in 2008, and he was replaced by Terry Blair.

== Personal life ==
White married Andrea Jacobs. They live in Kettering, Ohio, and have three children. They attend Fairhaven Church, which is affiliated with the Christian and Missionary Alliance.
