= Ohio's 6th senatorial district =

Ohio's 6th State Senate district
Senator
Willis Blackshear Jr. D–Dayton
- Demographics: 63.3% White; 26.4% Black; 4.6% Hispanic; 3.7% Asian; 2.3% Native American; 0.2% Hawaiian/Pacific Islander
- Population (2020) • Voting age • Citizens of voting age: 371,059; 290,703; 276,600

Ohio's 6th senatorial district was changed by the redistricting in 2023 and now encompasses the south and east section of Montgomery encompassing a good bit of Dayton. It is made up of the 36, 37 and 38 House Districts.

The current Ohio Senator is Democrat Willis Blackshear Jr..

== Historically ==
Before the 2023 redistricting, Ohios 6th senatorial district was always been based in Dayton, Ohio. It consists of about two-thirds of Montgomery County. It encompasses Ohio House districts 38, 39 and 40. It has a Cook PVI of D+4 following redistricting in 2023.

== List of senators ==
Senator	Party	Term	Notes
David Holcomb	Republican	January 3, 1967 – December 31, 1972	Holcomb lost re-election in 1972 to Tony Hall.
Tony P. Hall	Democrat	January 3, 1973 – January 1, 1979	Hall was elected to the United States Congress in 1978.
Chuck Curran	Democrat	January 9, 1979 – December 13, 1982	Curran resigned to become a Commissioner for Montgomery County, Ohio.
Tom Fries	Democrat	December 13, 1982 – March 6, 1984	Fries resigned prior to the expiration of his term.
Tom Talbott	Democrat	March 6, 1984 – December 31, 1984	Talbott lost re-election in 1984 to Chuck Horn.
Chuck Horn	Republican	January 3, 1985 – December 31, 2000	Horn was term-limited in 2000.
Jeff Jacobson	Republican	January 3, 2001 – October 18, 2008	Jacobson resigned prior to the expiration of his term.
Peggy Lehner	Republican	November 18, 2008 – December 31, 2008	Lehner served out the remainder of Jacobson's term until Senator-elect Jon Husted was seated.
Jon Husted	Republican	January 5, 2009 – January 10, 2011	Husted won election as Ohio Secretary of State in 2010.
Peggy Lehner	Republican	January 11, 2011 – December 31, 2020	Lehner was term-limited in 2020.
Niraj Antani	Republican	January 4, 2021 – January 4, 2025	Antani retired from the Ohio Senate to run for Ohio's 2nd congressional district
Willis Blackshear Jr.	Democrat	January 4, 2025 – Present	Incumbent
