= Arlene Setzer =

American politician

Member of the Ohio House of Representatives from the 36th district
- In office January 3, 2001-December 31, 2008
- Preceded by: Jeff Jacobson
- Succeeded by: Seth Morgan

Personal details
- Born: March 2, 1944 (age 82) Dayton, Ohio
- Party: Republican
- Education: University of Dayton (B.S.B.A.); Wright State University (M.Ed.)
- Profession: Teacher

Arlene Setzer (born March 2, 1944) is a former Republican member of the Ohio House of Representatives, who represented the 36th District from 2001 to 2008.

== Life and career ==
Setzer is a native of Dayton, Ohio and graduated from the University of Dayton with a Bachelor of Science degree in business administration and from Wright State University with a Master of Education degree. She has taught in the Vandalia, Ohio school system since 1967. She also worked at Wright State University as a professor.

In 1982, Setzer ran for Vandalia City Council, and won her first term. She served until 2000, and served twice as vice-mayor, from 1985 to 1988 and from 1995 to 2000.

== Ohio House of Representatives ==
When Representative Jeff Jacobson ran for the Ohio Senate in 2000, Setzer ran to replace him, and won the seat with 55.3% of the vote. She was seated on January 3, 2001. She won again in 2002 with 60.18% of the electorate, with 62.04% in 2004, and 60.08% in 2006.

Throughout her time in the legislature, Setzer served as Chairwoman of the Education Committee, a prominent position dealing with a plethora of issues.

Term limits required Setzer to relinquish her seat in 2008, and she was replaced by Seth Morgan. However, in 2011 Setzer ran for mayor of Vandalia, Ohio and was unopposed.
