= Chuck Horn =

American politician (1924–2022)

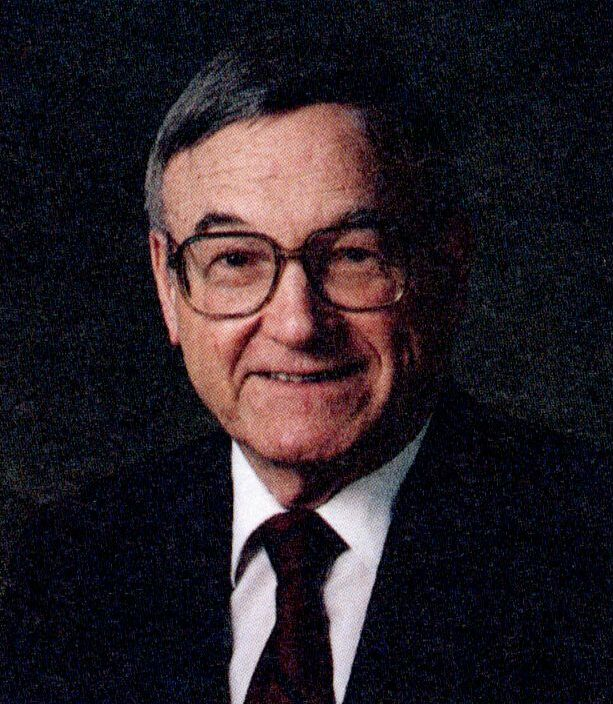

Member of the Ohio Senate from the 6th district
- In office January 3, 1985 – December 31, 2000
- Preceded by: Tom Talbott
- Succeeded by: Jeff Jacobson

Personal details
- Born: July 20, 1924 Bellefontaine, Ohio, U.S.
- Died: December 3, 2022 (aged 98) West Chester Township, Ohio, U.S.
- Party: Republican

Charles Frederick Horn (July 20, 1924 – December 3, 2022) was an American politician who served as a Republican member of the Ohio Senate. He represented the 6th district from 1985 to 2000. His district encompassed suburban Dayton, Ohio. In 2000, he faced term limits, and was succeeded by Jeff Jacobson.
