= Nina Turner =

American politician (born 1967)

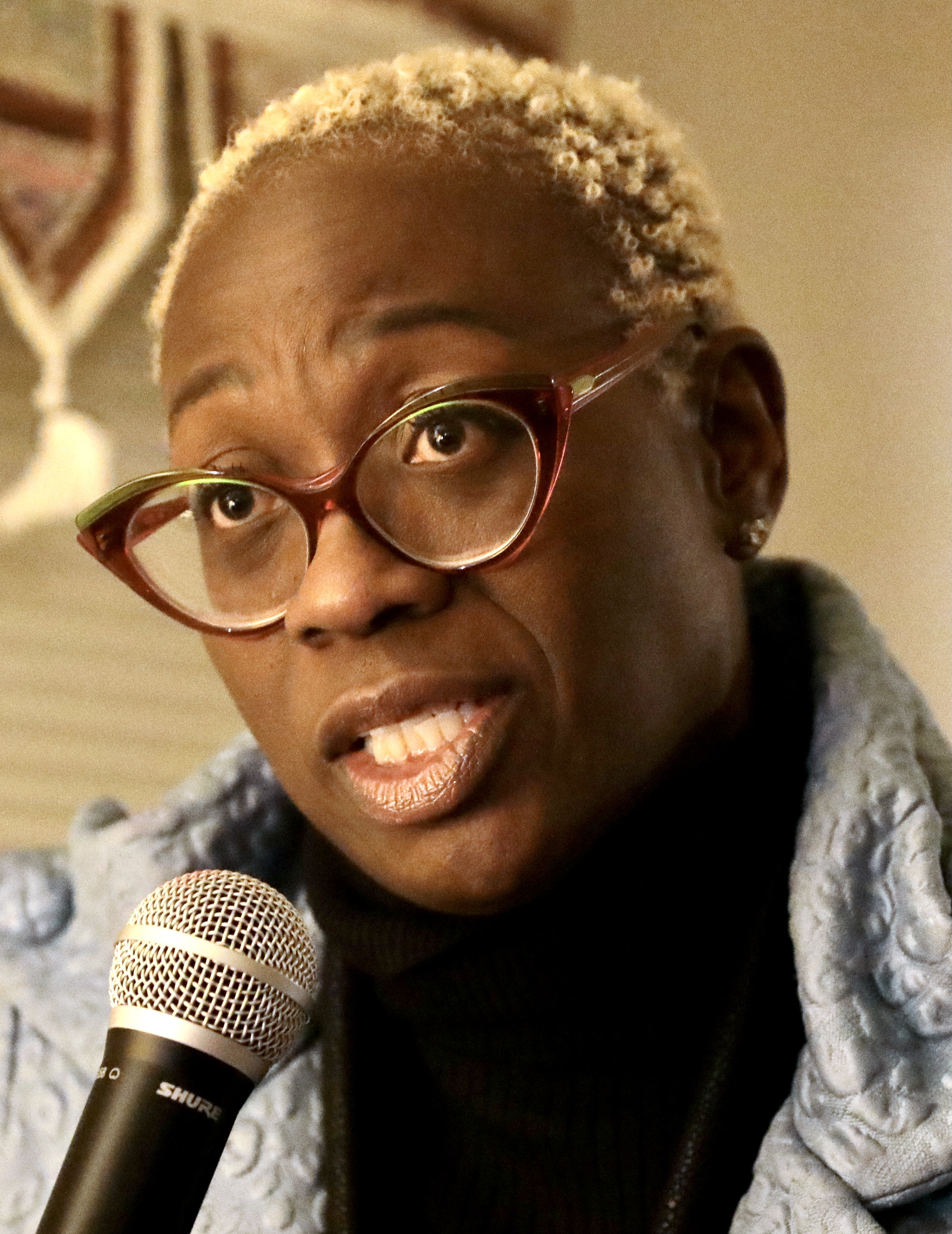
- Turner in 2020

Member of the Ohio Senate from the 25th district
- In office September 15, 2008 – December 31, 2014
- Preceded by: Lance Mason
- Succeeded by: Kenny Yuko

Member of the Cleveland City Council from Ward 1
- In office January 1, 2006 – September 16, 2008
- Preceded by: Joe Jones
- Succeeded by: Terrell Pruitt

Personal details
- Born: Nina Hudson; December 7, 1967 (age 58) Cleveland, Ohio, U.S.
- Party: Democratic
- Spouse: Jeffery Turner
- Children: 1
- Education: Cuyahoga Community College (AA); Cleveland State University (BA, MA)
- Website: ninaturner.com

Nina Turner (née Hudson; born December 7, 1967) is an American politician and television personality. A member of the Democratic Party, she was a Cleveland City Council member from 2006 to 2008 and served in the Ohio Senate from 2008 to 2014. Turner is a self-described democratic socialist whose politics have been variously described as progressive, left-wing, or far-left.

Turner was the Democratic nominee for Ohio Secretary of State in 2014, losing to incumbent Jon Husted. She supported Bernie Sanders in his 2016 presidential campaign, and became president of the Sanders-affiliated political action organization Our Revolution in 2017. She served as a national co-chair of Sanders's 2020 presidential campaign. Turner twice ran in the Democratic primary for Ohio's 11th congressional district, losing the 2021 special election to Shontel Brown by a margin of 5.66%, and was again unsuccessful in 2022.

== Early life and education ==
Turner is a native of Cleveland, Ohio. She was born Nina Hudson, the first of seven children born to Faye and Taalib. Her father and mother separated by the time Turner was five years old. Her mother worked as a preacher and as a nurse's aide in a senior home, struggled with high blood pressure all her life and died in 1992 at the age of 42.

Turner graduated from Cleveland's John F. Kennedy High School in 1986. She earned a Bachelor of Arts degree in history and a Master of Arts degree from Cleveland State University. She has an Associate in Arts degree from Cuyahoga Community College, where she has been an assistant professor of history.

== Career ==
Turner began her professional career as legislative aide in 2001 to Ohio State Senate member Rhine McLin. Turner then worked for Cleveland Mayor Michael R. White. She later lobbied for the Cleveland Metropolitan School District at the state and federal levels.

=== Cleveland City Council (2006–2008) ===
Turner made a run for Cleveland City Council in 2001, but was defeated by the incumbent, Joe Jones. In November 2004, Jones resigned his city council seat. His wife, Tonya Jones, was the top vote-getter in a September nine-way, non-partisan primary race to select a candidate to fill Jones' seat. In the November 2005 election, Turner defeated Tonya Jones to become the Council Member for Ward One, the first African American woman in the seat.

Turner served on Cleveland City Council from 2006 to 2008.

=== Ohio State Senate (2008–2014) ===
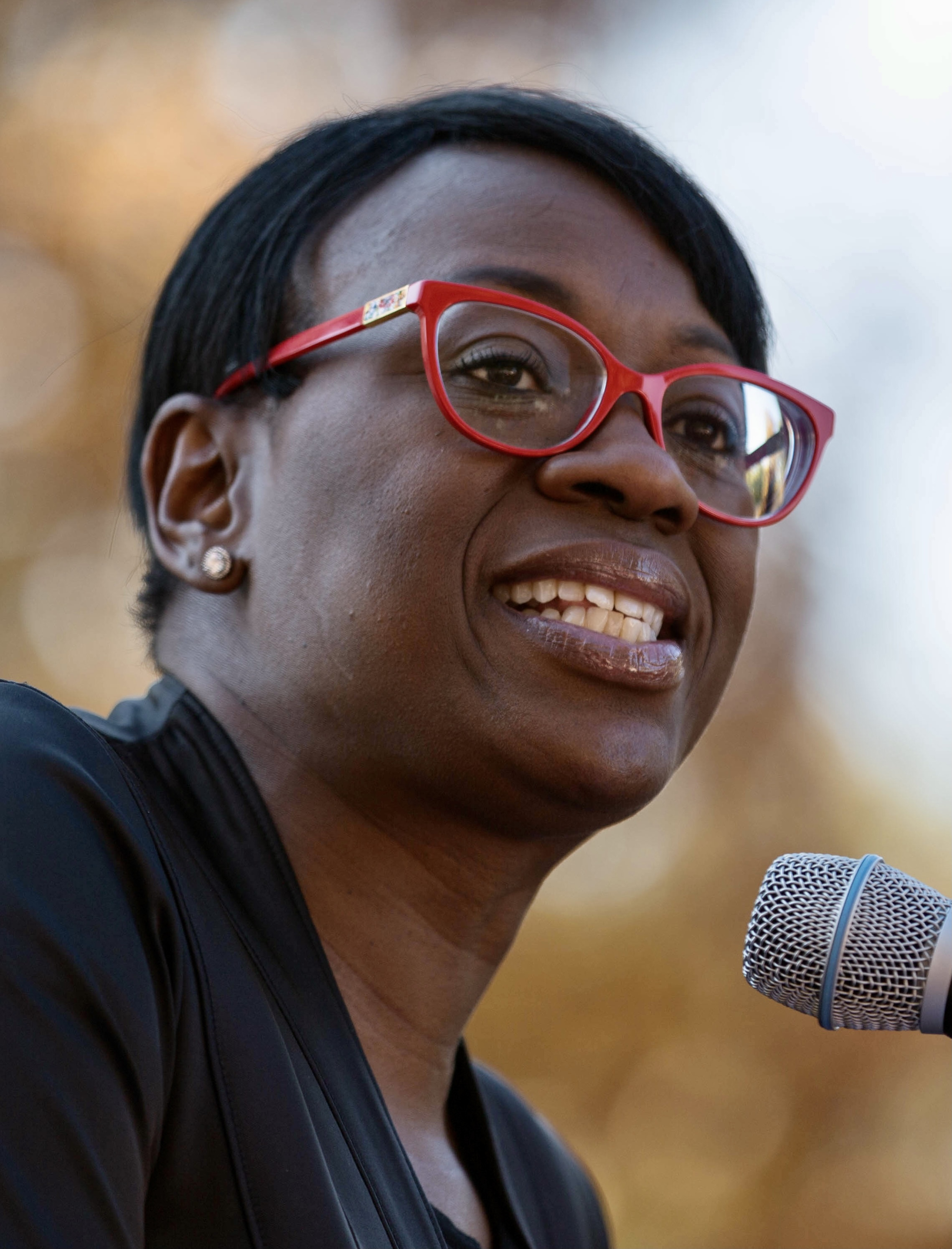
Turner speaking at a rally on November 17, 2016

In September 2008, Senator Lance Mason resigned his 25th District seat in the Ohio Senate to accept an appointment to the Cuyahoga County Court of Common Pleas. Turner was unanimously selected by the Ohio Senate Democratic caucus to serve the remainder of Mason's four-year senate term. She resigned her city council seat to accept the appointment on September 15, 2008. Turner won a full term in 2010, running unopposed in the general election.

In the 128th General Assembly, Turner was the ranking minority member on the Senate Highways & Transportation and Judiciary Criminal Justice Committees. She was elected as minority whip halfway through the 129th General Assembly. She was minority whip in the following general assembly term.

Turner considered running against incumbent Marcia Fudge in the 2012 Democratic primary for Ohio's 11th congressional district but declined, opting to stay in the State Senate.

As a political statement against legislation attempting to restrict women's access to contraception and abortion, in March 2012, Turner introduced a bill to regulate men's reproductive health. Before getting a prescription for erectile dysfunction drugs, a man would have to get a notarized affidavit signed by a recent sexual partner affirming his impotency, consult with a sex therapist and receive a cardiac stress test. She said the proposed statute would be parallel to recent legislation written by male legislators restricting women's reproductive health and that she was equally concerned about men's reproductive health. The proposed legislation was not meant to be passed, but as a way of bringing attention to similar bills targeted towards women.

In January 2014, Turner led unsuccessful efforts to change Ohio's rape custody law. It permits visitation and custody by men who father children via rape or sexual assault against a woman or girl. Turner wanted to protect rape victims/survivors and children conceived as a result of rape by preventing parental custody rights from being provided to rapists who fathered their children. She said it may be difficult for people to contemplate that a person would desire parental rights for a child conceived due to rape, though it occurs. She and fellow Democrat Charleta Tavares introduced SB-171. It would allow rape victims to file court claims terminating their attacker's parental rights and permit a mother to place her child up for adoption without being required to seek her attacker's approval. The bill was stalled in the senate.

=== 2014 Ohio Secretary of State campaign ===
On July 1, 2013, Turner declared her candidacy for Ohio Secretary of State, challenging Republican Jon Husted. On September 18, 2014, Bill Clinton officially supported Turner's candidacy. Turner was defeated 60%–35% by Husted.

=== Bernie Sanders 2016 presidential campaign ===
In the 2016 presidential election, Turner initially supported Hillary Clinton for the Democratic nomination but switched her support to Bernie Sanders. After Clinton won the nomination, Turner was invited by Jill Stein to become the Green Party's nominee for Vice President, but she declined saying, "I believe that the Democratic Party is worth fighting for." Turner went on to decline to endorse Hillary Clinton in the 2016 United States Presidential Election against Donald Trump, saying that she would endorse the party's platform in the election not an individual.

=== President of Our Revolution (2017–2019) ===
In 2017, Turner became the president and public face of Our Revolution, a political action organization to organize and elect progressive candidates, that grew out of Sanders's 2016 presidential campaign. Turner left Our Revolution in 2019 to focus on Sanders's 2020 presidential campaign.

According to a May 2018 review by Politico, Our Revolution was "flailing" and "in disarray" a year into her leadership. By May 2018, the organization's monthly fundraising totals were one-third of what they had been May 2017. According to Politico, the group operated primarily as a vehicle for Sanders and had "shown no ability to tip a major Democratic election in its favor—despite possessing Sanders's email list, the envy of the Democratic Party—and can claim no major wins in 2018 as its own". There was infighting within the group as figures in the organization speculated whether Turner was using the organization for a presidential run of her own. They questioned whether she was settling scores from 2016 with the Democratic National Committee and criticized her hiring of associates to senior positions within the organization. Our Revolution also endorsed Dennis Kucinich in the race for the Democratic nomination for the 2018 Ohio governorship; questions were raised about Turner's close relation to Kucinich's running mate.

=== Bernie Sanders 2020 presidential campaign ===
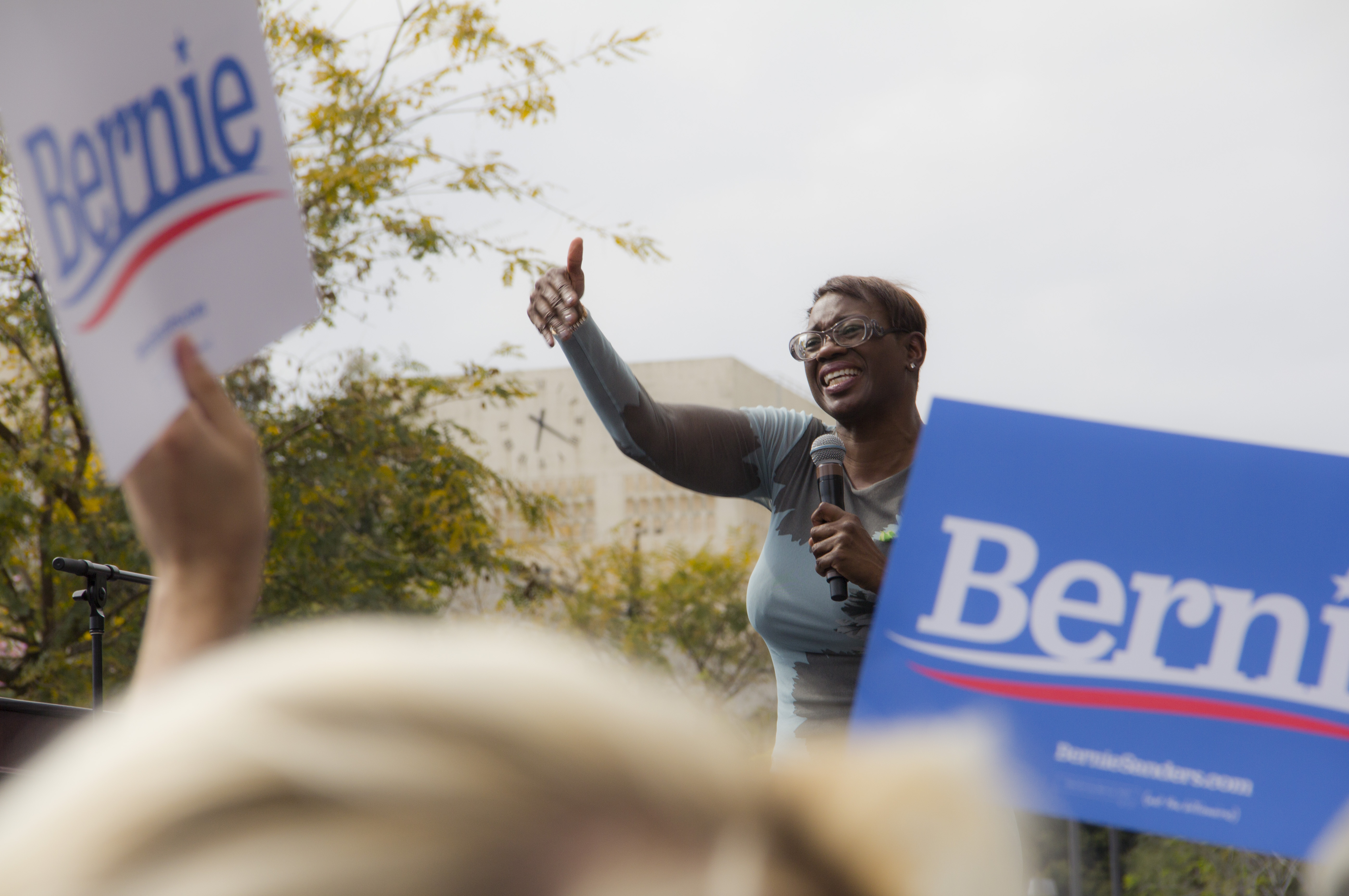
Turner campaigning for Sanders in March 2019

In February 2019, Turner was named a national co-chair of the Bernie Sanders 2020 presidential campaign. She appeared on Hardball with Chris Matthews, Meet the Press, Politics Nation, State of the Union, and other programs in support of Sanders.

A few weeks before the 2020 Democratic National Convention, Turner expressed her disdain for being forced to choose between presumptive Democratic nominee Joe Biden and incumbent Donald Trump. She told Peter Nicholas of The Atlantic, "it's like saying to somebody, 'You have a bowl of shit in front of you, and all you've got to do is eat half of it instead of the whole thing.' It's still shit." Turner declined to endorse Joe Biden in the 2020 United States Presidential election after Biden officially became the Democratic nominee.

In September 2020, in partnership with Mercury Public Affairs, Turner launched the progressive public affairs firm Amare Public Affairs.

=== Ohio's 11th congressional district campaigns ===
In 2021, Turner ran in a special election to replace Representative Marcia Fudge, who resigned her seat to become HUD secretary. By mid-June, Seth Richardson of The Plain Dealer considered Turner the sole front-runner, as expected support for Cuyahoga County Council member and moderate Democrat Shontel Brown's campaign had not materialized. Turner was often called the "frontrunner" in local and national media. Turner lost to Brown in the Democratic primary by a margin of 5.66%.

In September 2021, Turner filed paperwork with the FEC to run for Congress in the same district in 2022. Although she did not officially declare her intention to run for the seat at that time, her filing "leaves the door open. Turner has conceded in the past that she will make another run for Congress," according to The Plain Dealer.

On January 26, 2022, Turner announced her intention to run against Brown for a second time. Turner was not re-endorsed by prominent members of the Congressional Progressive Caucus who had endorsed her the previous year. On May 3, 2022, Brown defeated Turner with 66% of votes to Turner's 34%.

== Political views ==
Turner's politics have been described in the media as progressive, left-wing, or far-left. She identifies as a democratic socialist.

== Television appearances ==
Turner has worked for CNN as a contributor. In June 2017, she began a regular segment on The Real News Network called The Nina Turner Show. In 2018, Turner portrayed a fictitious version of herself in the pilot episode of the television series Black Lightning, praising Cress Williams' character Jefferson Pierce.

On September 14, 2021, Turner was hired by The Young Turks as a contributor and co-anchor.

On May 29, 2025, Mark Halperin's 2WAY Network launched a weekly roundtable-style news program called The Group Chat. The show is moderated by Batya Ungar-Sargon and includes Turner, Dan Turrentine, Emma Jo-Morris, and Robby Soave as co-hosts.

== Electoral history ==
Ohio Senate 25th district 2010 election
Year	Democrat	Votes	Pct	Republican	Votes	Pct
2010	Nina Turner	73,694	100.00%	Unopposed		

Ohio Secretary of State 2014 election
Year	Democrat	Votes	Pct	Republican	Votes	Pct	Libertarian	Votes	Pct
2014	Nina Turner	1,074,475	35.5%	Jon Husted	1,811,020	59.8%	Kevin Knedler	141,292	4.7%

2021 Ohio's 11th Congressional district special election Democratic primary
Party	Candidate	Votes	%
Democratic	Shontel Brown	38,505	50.11
Democratic	Nina Turner	34,239	44.56
Democratic	Jeff Johnson	1,388	1.81
Democratic	John E. Barnes Jr.	801	1.04
Democratic	Shirley Smith	599	0.78
Democratic	Seth J. Corey	493	0.64
Democratic	Pamela M. Pinkey	184	0.24
Democratic	Will Knight	182	0.24
Democratic	Tariq Shabazz	134	0.17
Democratic	Martin Alexander	105	0.14
Democratic	James Jerome Bell	101	0.13
Democratic	Lateek Shabazz	61	0.08
Democratic	Isaac Powell	52	0.07
Total votes		76,844	100.00

2022 Ohio's 11th congressional district Democratic primary
Party	Candidate	Votes	%
Democratic	Shontel Brown (incumbent)	40,517	66.5
Democratic	Nina Turner	20,395	33.5
Total votes		60,912	100.0

== Personal life ==
Turner is married to Jeffery Turner Sr. They have a son who is a lieutenant in the Ohio National Guard. They reside in Cleveland while Turner works out of Washington, D.C.

Turner is a Christian and has publicly stated how her faith forms a basis for her political convictions.

Party political offices
Preceded by Maryellen O'Shaughnessy	Democratic nominee for Ohio Secretary of State; 2014	Succeeded by Kathleen Clyde
Civic offices
Preceded by Joe Jones	Member of the Cleveland City Council from Ward 1; 2006–2008	Succeeded by Terrell Pruitt
Ohio Senate
Preceded by Lance Mason	Member of the Ohio Senate from the 25th district 2008–2014	Succeeded by Kenny Yuko
