= Peggy Lehner =

American politician (born 1950)

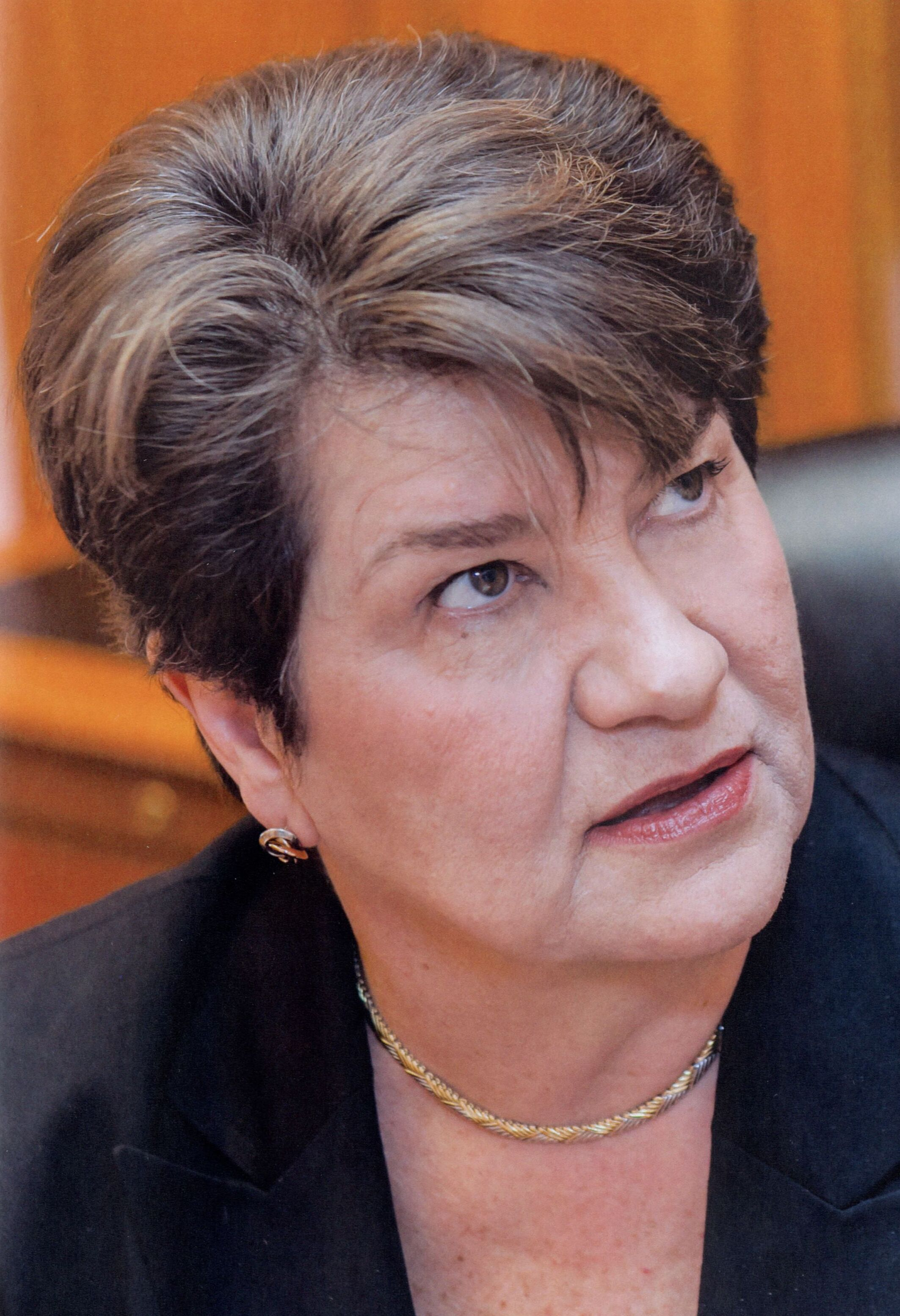
- Lehner in 2013-2014

Member of the Ohio Senate from the 6th district
- In office January 11, 2011 – December 31, 2020
- Preceded by: Jon Husted
- Succeeded by: Niraj Antani
- In office November 18, 2008 – December 31, 2008
- Preceded by: Jeff Jacobson
- Succeeded by: Jon Husted

Member of the Ohio House of Representatives from the 37th district
- In office January 5, 2009 – January 10, 2011
- Preceded by: Jon Husted
- Succeeded by: Jim Butler

Personal details
- Born: August 5, 1950 (age 76) Cleveland, Ohio, U.S.
- Party: Republican
- Spouse: Jim Lehner
- Children: 5
- Education: Saint Mary-of-the-Woods College (BA)
- Profession: Legislator

Marguerite B. Lehner (born August 5, 1950) is an American politician who is the current mayor of Kettering, Ohio. Formerly, she also served in the Ohio Senate, Ohio House of Representatives, and on the Kettering City Council. Her Senate district was located entirely in Montgomery County and included Vandalia, Riverside, Kettering, Centerville, Miamisburg and Germantown. Lehner is a Republican.

== Career ==
Having attended American University of Paris and graduating from Saint Mary-of-the-Woods College, Lehner was a three-term city councilwoman in Kettering, sat on the Ohio Ethics Commission from 1991 to 1997, served as a board member for the Greater Dayton Regional Transit Authority and has been active in efforts to address issues facing Dayton-area suburbs for decades.

While Lehner was originally elected to the Ohio House of Representatives in 2008, she came first to the Statehouse as a member of the Ohio Senate. When Senator Jeff Jacobson resigned his seat early, he left a vacancy in an important lame duck session. Since Jacobson's elected successor Jon Husted was at that time serving as Speaker of the Ohio House, he was unable to resign and take his new seat in the Senate. Therefore, Senate leadership appointed Lehner to temporarily take a seat in the Senate to fill out the remainder of Jacobson's term. Following a month-long tenure in the Senate, Lehner then began her term as in the House.

With incumbent and Speaker of the House Husted unable to run due to term limits, Lehner opted to succeed him. She faced Democrat Andi Eveslage in the general election, and won with 64% of the vote. She easily won reelection in 2010 with 70% of the vote, but only would serve about a week of that term.

== Return to the Ohio Senate ==
After Senator Husted was elected as Ohio Secretary of State on November 2, 2010, he was required to resign his seat in the Ohio Senate. Lehner, who preceded Husted (albeit for only a month-long tenure), was named as a potential successor once the seat had been vacated. Lehner was up against five other potential appointees, including former state Representative Seth Morgan.

On December 13, 2010, it was announced that the Senate Republicans had decided to appoint Lehner to fill the remaining two years of Husted's term. In a homecoming of sorts, Lehner was sworn into the seat she previously held on January 11, 2011, resigning from the House to do so.

Lehner won a full term in the Ohio Senate in 2012, defeating Democrat Rick McKiddy with 63% of the vote. In 2013, she began serving as chairwoman of the Senate Education Committee. Lehner, as chairwoman, was influential in education policy, including charter school reform. Although she is pro-charter, she has advocated for stronger charter school oversight and reform.

== Electoral history ==
Election results
Year	Office	Election	Votes for Lehner	%	Opponent	Party	Votes	%
2001	Kettering City Council	General	5,158	51%	Don Patterson	Democratic	4,974	49%
2005	Kettering City Council	General	10,545	40%				
2008	Ohio House of Representatives	General	35,171	64%	Andi Eveslage	Democratic	19,089	36%
2010	Ohio House of Representatives	General	28,598	70%	Steven Byington	Democratic	12,429	30%
2012	Ohio Senate	General	103,183	62%	Rick McKiddy	Democratic	61,235	38%
2016	Ohio Senate	General	114,168	68%	Albert Griggs, Jr	Democratic	53,584	32%
2021	Kettering Mayor	General		100	Unopposed			
