= Jeff Jacobson (politician) =

American politician

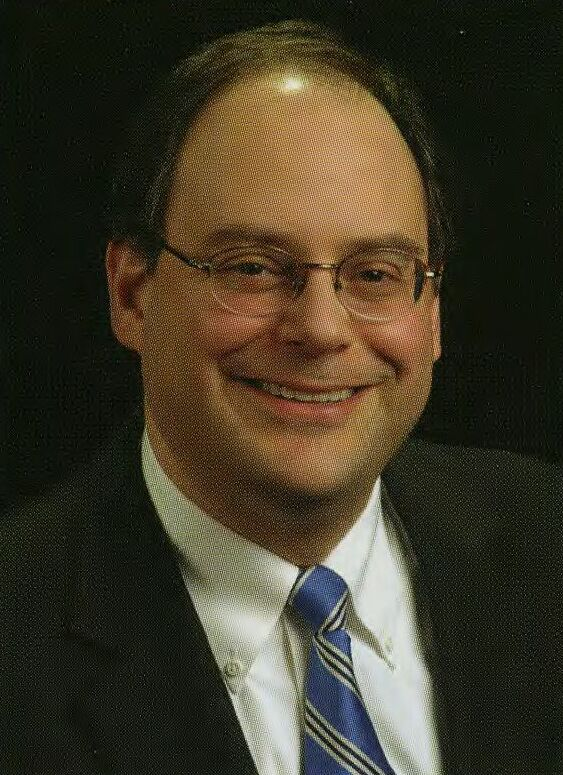

Member of the Ohio Senate from the 6th district
- In office January 3, 2001 – October 31, 2008
- Preceded by: Chuck Horn
- Succeeded by: Peggy Lehner

Member of the Ohio House of Representatives from the 40th district
- In office June 17, 1992 – December 31, 2000
- Preceded by: Russ Guerra
- Succeeded by: Arlene Setzer

Personal details
- Party: Republican
- Education: Yale University (BA); University of Dayton (JD)
- Profession: attorney

Jeff Jacobson is an American consultant, former attorney, and former politician. He was a Republican member of the Ohio Senate, representing the 6th district starting in 2001. Previously he was a member of the Ohio House of Representatives from 1992 until 2000.

== Biography ==
Jeff Jacobson graduated cum laude with a B.A. from Yale University and received his J.D. summa cum laude from The University of Dayton. Jacobson was a member of the Ohio House of Representatives from 1992 until 2000. He then represented the 6th District in the Ohio Senate starting in 2001. After easily winning reelection to the Senate in 2004, Jacobson was elected to the No. 2 spot as president pro tempore under Senator Bill Harris.

In 2003, it was reported that he was in a strong position to become Senate president in January 2005. At the time, he was Majority Whip, and as whip he chaired the committee that amended HB274 in December 2002. In 2005, as Senate President pro tempore he sponsored Senate Bill 9 to require specific provisions for aircraft in Ohio to be secured, with a milder version passing later. In 2014, he took part in secret negotiations to propose a constitutional amendment to change the redistricting process in Ohio, and the resulting House Joint Resolution 12 was 80-4 before going to the Senate, where it underwent mild changes before being approved by the Senate and then Ohio voters. He also authored the Ohio law requiring that public employees disclose any intent to collect retirement early. In 2006, Bill Harris was Senate president, apologizing after a shouting match evolved from a debate being held between Jacobson and Democratic Senator Ray Miller over racism. During his sixteen years in public service, he enacted legislation on topics such as education reform, tax policy, criminal justice, nursing home reimbursement formulas, election and campaign finance law, the abolition of predatory mortgage lending and the regulation of payday lending, collective bargaining and prevailing wage law, and electric utility re-regulation. He left office due to reaching the end of term limits.

He officially retired from politics in 2008, leaving to become a public policy consultant to clients such as the Ohio Business Roundtable. He served as a member of the Ohio State Medical Board from 2008 until 2009, and as a member of the Ohio Air Quality Development Authority from 2009 until 2014, in both cases appointed by former Governor Ted Strickland. Jacobson has worked as a strategist, consultant, and policy expert for a range of business and non-profit clients.

By 2018, he had been employed by the payday industry as a lobbyist. By 2020, he was a lobbyist representing beer wholesalers, utilities and payday lenders. In 2020, he was also helping GOP lawmakers search for a new speaker, although he asserted that he was only offering insight, not overseeing the process. He is President of Strategic Insight Group, Ltd., a consulting and governmental relations firm serving private, public, and non-profit clients interested in impacting public policy development and state governmental decision-making in Ohio.
