= Maryellen O'Shaughnessy =

American politician

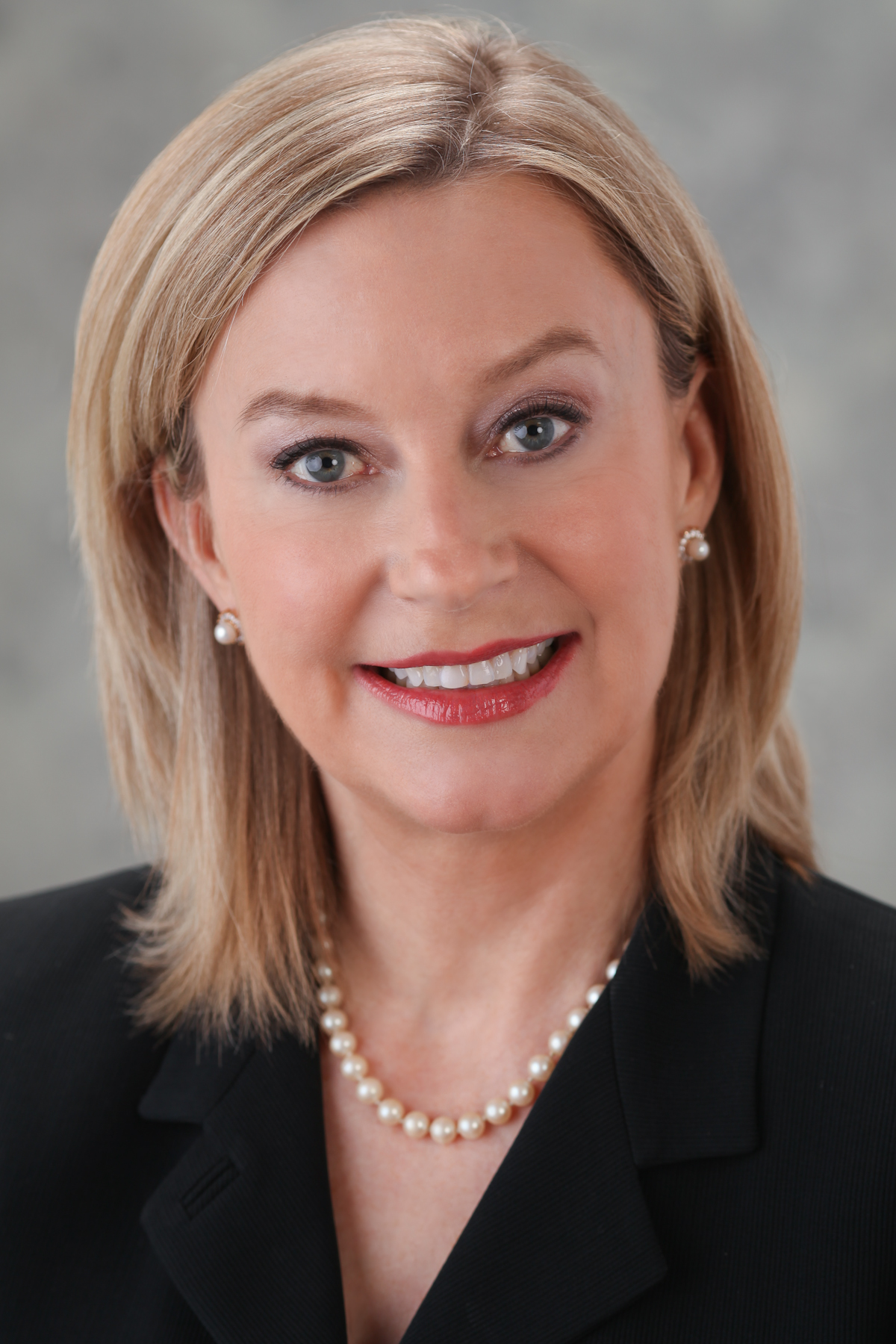

Franklin County, Ohio Clerk of Courts
- Incumbent
- Assumed office January 2, 2009
- Preceded by: John O'Grady

Member of Columbus City Council
- In office January 2, 1998 – January 1, 2009

Personal details
- Party: Democratic
- Education: Ohio State University

Maryellen O'Shaughnessy is an American Democratic politician from Columbus, Ohio, and the current Franklin County Clerk of Courts. O'Shaughnessy is serving in her fourth consecutive term.

== Background ==
O'Shaughnessy is a fifth-generation Central Ohioan. She graduated from Bishop Watterson High School and received a B.A. from The Ohio State University in journalism.

O'Shaughnessy is a fourth-generation funeral director and owner of the O'Shaughnessy Company Funeral Directors, established in 1889. O'Shaughnessy's first campaign for office was in 1992 when she was the Democratic nominee for Franklin County Commissioner. She received 42% of the vote to Republican Dorothy Teater's 58%.

In 1997, O'Shaughnessy was elected to her first of 3 terms on Columbus City Council. While on Council she was an advocate for transportation, sustainability and the arts. O'Shaughnessy was the top vote getter in the 2001 and 2005 Council elections.

In 2000, O'Shaughnessy lost to Pat Tiberi when she ran for Ohio's 12th congressional district.

In 2002, O'Shaughnessy unsuccessfully ran for Franklin County Commissioner a 2nd time. She received 49% to the incumbent Republican Dewey Stokes' 51%.

In 2008, O'Shaughnessy ran for and was elected Clerk of the Franklin County Court of Common Pleas. She was unopposed in her 2012 election, and received 67% of the vote in both her 2016 and 2020 re-election campaigns.

In 2010, O'Shaughnessy was the Democratic Party nominee for Ohio Secretary of State. She was opposed by Republican Jon A. Husted, then a member of the Ohio State Senate, and previously Speaker of the Ohio House, and Libertarian Charles Earl. Husted won election with 53.7% to O'Shaughnessy's 41.5% and Earl's 4.8%.

During her tenure as clerk of courts, her leadership has led to the office processing more than half-a-million vehicle titles a year – the most in Ohio – and has sent more than $7 million in auto-title funds to the county’s general fund. In the course of the 2020 budget process, O'Shaughnessy was able to return an additional $3 million in surplus funds to the county's general fund, bringing her office's total to more than $10 million during her tenure as Franklin County Clerk of Courts. The $3 million returned from 2019 will drive the modernization of the county court's computer systems.

== Personal life ==
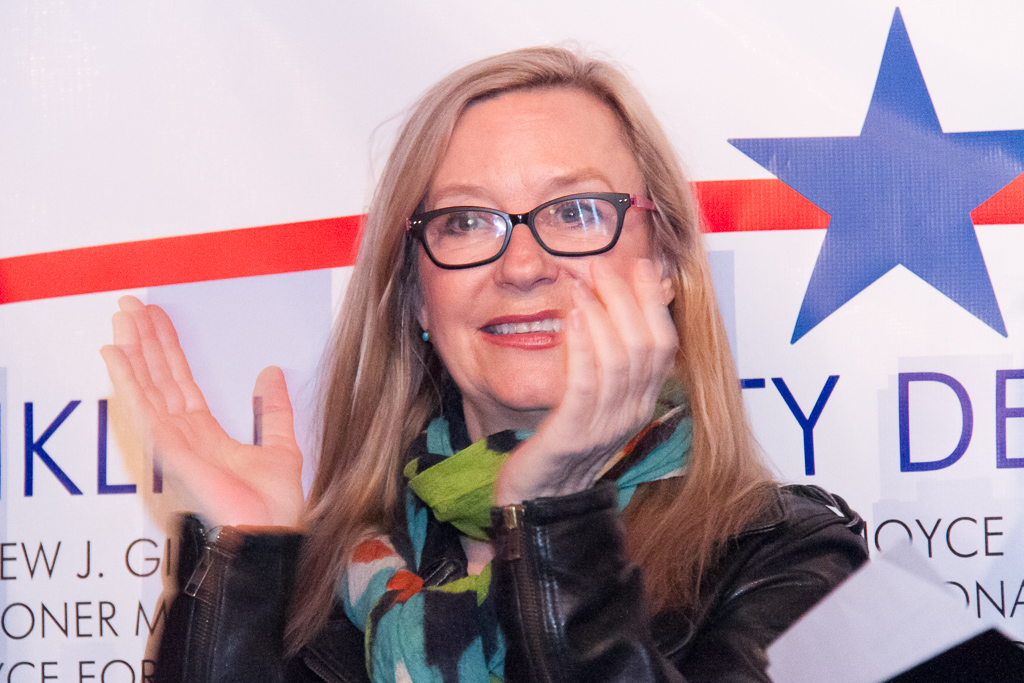
O'Shaughnessy in March 2016

O'Shaughnessy lives in Columbus, Ohio. She is a member of the O'Shaughnessy political family, and is the daughter of former Ohio State Senator Robert O'Shaughnessy.

O'Shaughnessy is a member of the Roman Catholic Church, she has received the Diocesan Service Award. She has served or currently is on the boards of the Columbus Historical Society and the Greenways Working Group of the Mid-Ohio Regional Planning Commission.

== Notes ==
Party political offices
Preceded by Jennifer Brunner	Democratic nominee for Ohio Secretary of State; 2010	Succeeded by Nina Turner
