= Brian Chavez =

American politician

Member of the Ohio Senate from the 30th district
- Incumbent
- Assumed office December 8, 2023
- Preceded by: Frank Hoagland

Personal details
- Party: Republican
- Spouse: Christy
- Children: 2
- Education: University of New Mexico

Brian Chavez is a Republican member of the Ohio Senate representing the 30th district. He was appointed to the seat in 2023 following the resignation of Frank Hoagland.

He studied chemical engineering at the University of New Mexico. He is the manager and owner of Reno Oil and Gas LLC and Chavez Well Service LLC as well as the CEO of Deeprock Disposal Solutions LLC. He previously worked as engineer at Intel.

Prior to his appointment to the Ohio Senate, he was appointed by Ohio Governor Mike DeWine as one of five members of the Ohio Oil and Gas Commission for a term beginning on June 4, 2021.
