= Beth Liston =

American politician (born 1974)

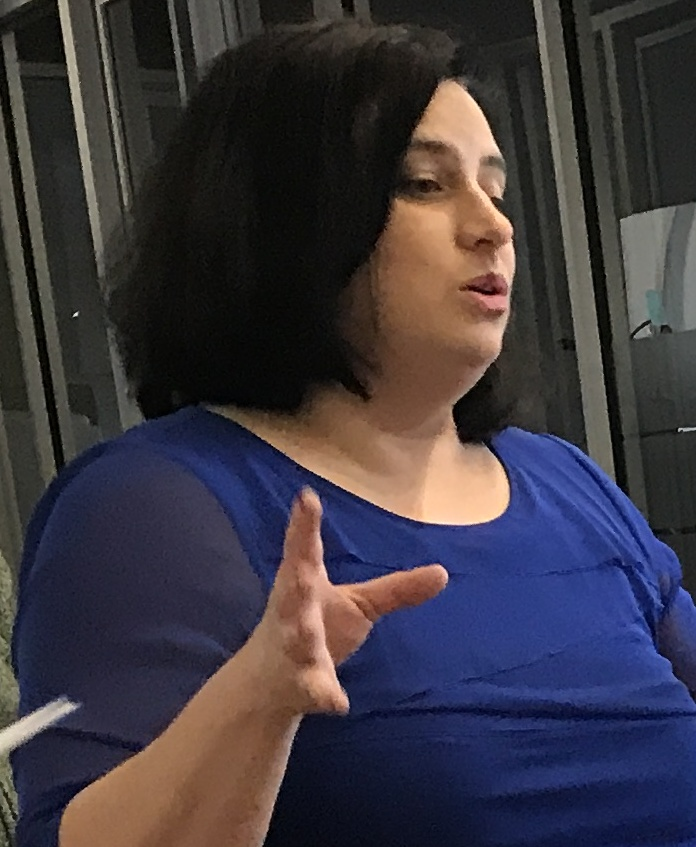

Member of the Ohio Senate from the 16th district
- Incumbent
- Assumed office January 1, 2025
- Preceded by: Stephanie Kunze

Member of the Ohio House of Representatives from the 8th district
- In office January 1, 2019 – December 31, 2024
- Preceded by: Mike Duffey
- Succeeded by: Anita Somani (redistricting)

Personal details
- Born: October 26, 1974 (age 51)
- Party: Democratic
- Spouse: Denver Liston
- Education: University of Notre Dame (BS); Ohio State University (MD, PhD)
- Occupation: doctor, professor
- Website: bethliston.com

Beth Wagner Liston (born October 26, 1974) is an American doctor and politician who is the member of the Ohio Senate representing the 16th district in Franklin County since 2025. She previously represented the 8th district in the Ohio House of Representatives from the 8th district. Ohio House District 8 includes Dublin, Worthington, and parts of Northwest Columbus. She was elected to the Ohio Senate in the 2024 election for the 16th district.

== Early life and education ==
Liston was born on Long Island, New York and moved to Columbus at the age of 8. Growing up in Worthington, she attended Linworth Alternative High School as well as Thomas Worthington High School and graduated as Salutatorian in 1992. Liston was awarded the Glenna R Joyce Scholarship which included a full scholarship to study at the University of Notre Dame where she graduated magna cum laude in 1996 with a degree in biochemistry. After graduating from Notre Dame, Liston enrolled in a dual MD/PhD program at Ohio State University. Her PhD research was focused on the molecular biology of cancer chemo-prevention. In 2002, Liston graduated cum laude earning both an MD and PhD. For her accomplishments in medical studies, she was inducted into Alpha Omega Alpha medical honor society. Liston completed her medical residency training at Yale New Haven Hospital between 2002 and 2006 and is currently board certified in both Internal Medicine and Pediatrics.

Beth and her husband Denver Liston live in Dublin with their two children Madeline and Adam. She also is a member of the Dublin Worthington Rotary and President Elect of the Columbus Medical Association.

== Medical career ==
After completing her studies in 2006, Beth Liston joined the faculty at Ohio State University as an assistant professor in the Department of Internal Medicine, Division of Hospital Medicine. She has since been caring for hospitalized adults and children at both Ohio State Wexner Medical Center and Nationwide Children's Hospital. In 2012, Liston was promoted to associate professor and in 2018 promoted to full professor of clinical medicine based on her research and national reputation for developing curricula in the fields of clinical reasoning and inter-professional collaboration. Liston is one of only a handful of professors in hospital medicine across the nation, and the only of over 100 doctors in her division to achieve this rank.

== Political career ==
=== Election ===
Liston was elected in the general election on November 6, 2018, winning 57 percent of the vote over 43 percent for Republican candidate Stu Harris, flipping the seat from Republican control to Democratic control. Liston was re-elected in the general election on November 3, 2020, winning 56.8 percent of the vote over 43.2 percent for Republican candidate Mehek Cooke.

=== Committees ===
133rd General Assembly

Liston served on the following committees in the 133rd GA: Health, Economic and Workforce Development, and Aging and Long Term Care.

134th General Assembly

Liston serves on the following committees in the current GA: Health, Behavioral Health and Recovery Supports, Ways and Means, and serves as the Ranking Minority Member on Families, Aging, and Human Services.

=== Legislation ===
133rd General Assembly

Representative Liston was the Primary Sponsor of 9 bills introduced in the legislature during the 133rd GA; House Bill 61, House Bill 165, House Bill 198, House Bill 300, House Bill 315, House Bill 379, House Bill 385, House Bill 387, and House Bill 407. Liston was also a cosponsor of over 100 other pieces of legislation.

134th General Assembly

Liston is the Primary Sponsor of 3 bills currently introduced in the legislature; House Bill 41, House Bill 153, and House Bill 212. Liston is also a cosponsor of over 40 other pieces of legislation.

== Election history ==
Ohio House 21st District
Year	Democrat	Votes	Pct	Republican	Votes	Pct
2018	Beth Liston	34,956	56.72%	Stu Harris	26,676	43.28%
2020	Beth Liston	42,990	56.8%	Mehek Cooke	32,756	43.2%
2022	Beth Liston	33,436	68.4%	Zully Truemper	15,455	31.6%

Ohio Senate 16th District
Year	Democrat	Votes	Pct	Republican	Votes	Pct
2024	Beth Liston	113,896	60.34%	Besa Sharrah	74,856	39.66%
