= Cleveland Sight Center =

US non-profit organization

- Formation: 1906; 120 years ago
- Type: Nonprofit
- Tax ID no.: 34-0714652
- Headquarters: Cleveland, Ohio
- Board Chair: Beth W. Smith
- Main organ: Board of Trustees
- Website: clevelandsightcenter.org
- Formerly called: Cleveland Society for the Blind

The Cleveland Sight Center (CSC) is a non-profit organization that provides services to individuals who are blind or visually impaired. CSC’s mission is to provide individualized support and tools to navigate the visual world. Founded in 1906, it is accredited by the Commission on Accreditation of Rehabilitation Facilities (CARF) and serves thousands of individuals annually in Northeast Ohio.

As part of the continuum of care, CSC’s specialized staff creates individualized plans to help each person understand their vision diagnosis, overcome barriers and reach their goals through a variety of service areas. The staff includes over 100 professionals, including social workers, optometrists, vision rehabilitation therapists, orientation and mobility instructors, occupational therapists, and educators who work to help clients achieve independence. Services and activities are tailored to different age groups but many overlap, enabling clients to gain independence in all areas of their life.

== History ==
The Cleveland Sight Center was founded in 1906 under the name Cleveland Society for the Blind, inspired by an 1898 project at Goodrich House which, among other things, encouraged enrollment of blind and visually impaired individuals in the Cleveland Public School System. In early 1906, with support from the Cleveland Public Library system, Visiting Nursing Association, related charities, area settlement houses, and the American Foundation for the Blind under Robert B. Irwin, the Society for the Blind was established. In 1989 it was renamed as Cleveland Sight Center of the Cleveland Society for the Blind.

== Leadership ==
In April 2015, Cuyahoga County Development Director, Larry Benders, became the tenth President and CEO of the Cleveland Sight Center. Under his direction, the organization increased its operating budget from $8 million to $12.5 million and doubled its endowment to $120 million. Staff expanded by 36%, with one-third of employees having a work-limiting disability.

In 2019, Benders led a coalition that successfully lobbied for the first statewide Medicaid coverage of white canes for Ohioans. He also directs a statewide network that runs the largest early intervention program for blind and visually impaired children in Ohio.

Benders had served as the director of the Cuyahoga County Workforce Investment Board. He had also served as the Vice President of Marketing for the Rock and Roll Hall of Fame and Museum.

== Available Technologies ==
CSC's Store, which is the largest of its kind in Ohio, offers more than 800 low vision aids, technologies and training to its clients, including computers, voice control calualators, echo, clocks, software magnification (ZoomText & MAGic), screen reader (JAWS, Window Eyes, System Access), optical character recognition (Kurzweil, OpenBook, and OmniPage), Braille translation (Duxbury), digital recorders, and digital book players, Braille embossers, refreshable Braille displays, note takers (PacMate, BrailleNote, and Braille), and Microsoft Office (Word, Outlook, Excel, PowerPoint, Access, etc.).

== Support Services ==
Cleveland Sight Center offers case management services from licensed case managers to ensure each individual has the resources, support and information needed to reach their goals. This includes connecting them with financial assistance programs as needed.

CSC also offers peer mentoring programs for individuals with low vision to connect with one another, as well as recreation and socialization services. These activities, designed to encourage self-care and self-esteem, may include things like pottery, candle making, yoga, hiking, or learning about nutrition and mental health.

== Employment Services ==
Cleveland Sight Center's Employment Services help adults who are blind or visually impaired seek and maintain career opportunities. Employment Services inform clients and employers of the accommodations available to help the blind and visually impaired utilize their abilities and talents to their fullest capacity in the workplace.

After determining what career interests clients have and/or are best suited for via its comprehensive vocational evaluation system, staff provide clients with training in various areas of job readiness, from learning to fill out applications and develop their resumes to practicing job interviews and learning about employer expectations. Through networking and partnerships with various organizations in northeast Ohio, including Progressive Field, the Great Lakes Science Center, and the Rock and Roll Hall of Fame, employment services help connect clients with employers and secure work.

CSC established and launched a Call Center in 2010 which provides services to Ohio's government agencies, including Cuyahoga County Board of Elections, Cuyahoga Job and Family Services, and Ohio Department of Taxation, Ohio Secretary of State, and Tourism Ohio. The Call Center now has annual revenues of $2.2 million a year and a workforce of over 70 representatives - nearly all of whom have a work-limiting disability. Over 500,000 calls and 50,000 emails are handled each year with measurably excellent levels or customer service.

== Early Intervention ==
Cleveland Sight Center's Early Intervention program works with children from birth to 3 years old and their families to help them overcome or minimize developmental delays, including adjusting to vision loss.

The program staff includes an early interventionist, occupational therapist, physical therapist and a speech and language therapist who conduct assessments and activities, host weekly support groups, and provide encouragement and information for each family through these most crucial first three years of the client's life.

== Preschool and Children's Services ==
Cleveland Sight Center's Preschool is a program for 3- to 5-year-old children who have disabilities, including visual impairments. Children without any disabilities are also welcome.

Students each receive assessments conducted by the Early Intervention staff, resulting in the creation of personalized lesson plans for them in typical areas of importance for developing children. The students participate in the program four times a week.

In addition to the preschool, CSC provides a range of Children’s Services, including early intervention for children and families to maximize skills across developmental areas and school-age case management to guide children and families through the special education process.

== Events ==
=== White Cane Walk ===
White Cane Walk is CSC's annual fundraiser to raise awareness and support for the blind and visually impaired community. The event, hosted at Cleveland Sight Center, educates participants about the importance of the white cane, the blind and visually impaired community and Cleveland Sight Center. The event features a one-mile walk around Wade Lagoon in University Circle and a celebration to follow with family-friendly music, food and games.

== Community Education and Advocacy ==
CSC’s Education and Advocacy team provides training and resources to various community groups, professionals, and the general public to enhance understanding and improve interactions with individuals who are visually impaired. The team offers a range of presentations and training programs on topics such as "Blindness Basics," "Working with Students who are Visually Impaired," and specialized training for emergency responders, educators, and customer service professionals. These programs are designed to equip participants with the knowledge and skills to better serve and support those with vision loss.

Cleveland Sight Center has partnered with organizations such as MetroHealth Medical Center, Intercontinental Hotel Cleveland, and University Circle Police Department to deliver these presentations. Alicia Howerton, the Manager of External and Government Relations, and Tom Sawyer, an Outreach Specialist, lead these efforts. They have served as key advocates and educators for over a decade, promoting awareness and accessibility throughout the community.

== Radio Network ==
CSC operates its own dedicated radio network, providing a variety of informative and entertaining programming tailored to individuals with visual impairments. The network features a unique daily schedule where volunteers read and record newspapers, magazine articles, and stories, keeping listeners updated on current events and cultural topics. It is accessible through an online stream or on local cable channel 25-9 in the Cleveland area. The content is produced under the authority of Section 121 of Title 17 of the United States Code and is intended specifically for the visually impaired. The station is coordinated by Glenn Wickline, who oversees the network's operations and volunteer team.

== Highbrook Lodge Camp ==
Highbrook Lodge, founded in 1928, was Cleveland Sight Center's ACA Accredited summer camp spanning over 60 acres in Geauga County. Camp sessions were held throughout the months of June, July, and August, each focusing on a specific age group. Activities included arts and crafts, book clubs, sports and recreation, field trips, and more.

In 2023, the Board of Trustees of CSC concluded that CSC would no longer operate Highbrook Lodge, citing that the benefits of running camp were outweighed by the declining client demand, challenges in hiring and retaining qualified support staff and the risks of operating a residential, overnight facility. Today, CSC continues to provide social and recreational activities through their Leisure and Lifestyle programming at CSC’s headquarters.

== See also ==
- Visual impairment
- Blindness
- White cane
- Low vision
- Guide dog
- Orientation and mobility
- Cleveland
