= Willis Blackshear Jr. =

American politician

Member of the Ohio Senate from the 6th district
- Incumbent
- Assumed office January 1, 2025
- Preceded by: Niraj Antani

Member of the Ohio House of Representatives from the 38th district
- In office January 1, 2021 – December 31, 2024
- Preceded by: Fred Strahorn
- Succeeded by: Desiree Tims

Personal details
- Party: Democratic
- Education: Wright State University (Bachelor of Arts in Political Science)

Willis Blackshear Jr. is a Democratic member of the Ohio Senate representing the 6th district. He previously served in the Ohio House of Representatives representing the 38th district. He was elected in 2020, defeating Republican John Ferrell Mullins III with 79% of the vote. Prior to his election the Ohio House, Blackshear worked in the Montgomery County Auditor's Office as an outreach specialist.

== Ohio House of Representatives ==
=== Election ===
Blackshear was elected in the general election on November 3, 2020.

=== Committees ===
Blackshear serves on the following committees: Commerce and Labor, Criminal Justice, and Agriculture and Rural Development.

== Ohio Senate ==
In October 2023, Blackshear pulled petitions to run for the 6th Senate District of Ohio. He was elected to the seat in November 2024.

== Election history ==
Ohio House 39th District
| Year | Democrat | Votes | Pct | Republican | Votes | Pct |
|---|---|---|---|---|---|---|
| 2020 | Willis Blackshear | 31,583 | 79.3% | John Ferrell Mullins III | 8,269 | 20.7% |
