= Niraj Antani =

American politician (born 1991)

Member of the Ohio Senate from the 6th district
- In office January 4, 2021 – December 31, 2024
- Preceded by: Peggy Lehner
- Succeeded by: Willis Blackshear Jr.

Member of the Ohio House of Representatives from the 42nd district
- In office December 2, 2014 – December 31, 2020
- Preceded by: Terry Blair
- Succeeded by: Tom Young

Personal details
- Born: Niraj Jaimini Antani; February 26, 1991 (age 35) Miami Township, Ohio, U.S.
- Party: Republican
- Education: Ohio State University (BA); University of Dayton (attended)

Niraj Jaimini Antani (born February 26, 1991) is an American politician from the state of Ohio. A Republican, he represented the 6th district in the Ohio State Senate from 2021 to 2024, covering the northern, eastern, and southern of Montgomery County. Prior to this, he served three terms in the Ohio House of Representatives as representative from the 42nd district.

Antani was the first Indian and Hindu American member of the Ohio State Senate.

== Early life and education ==
Antani was born to Hindu immigrant parents from India, was and raised in Miami Township. He lives in Miamisburg, Ohio. Antani attended Miamisburg City Schools and graduated from Miamisburg High School in 2009. He went on to Ohio State University and earned his bachelor's degree in political science. After that, he briefly attended the University of Dayton Law School before leaving to run for State Representative.

== Career ==
When state Representative Terry Blair died after winning the 2014 primary election for a fourth term, Antani was chosen by the Montgomery County Republican party to replace Blair on the ballot. It was a difficult win for Antani, who was at the time a political outsider, "It took four rounds for Niraj Antani of Miami Twp. to gain a majority of votes from the district’s GOP precinct captains." However, Antani won the general election 64.5% to 35.5% over Democrat Patrick Merris at the age of 23. Antani was sworn in to the Ohio House of Representatives to complete the remainder of Blair's term on December 2, 2014.

During the 2020 United States elections, Antani ran for Ohio State Senate in the 6th district. This district includes much of eastern Montgomery County, Ohio. Antani won the general election against Democratic Party candidate Mark Fogel with 53.17% of the vote.

In 2019, Antani co-sponsored legislation, along with 21 other House Republicans that would restrict abortion in Ohio. Doctors who performed abortions in cases of ectopic pregnancy and other life-threatening conditions would be exempt from prosecution only if they "[took] all possible steps to preserve the life of the unborn child, while preserving the life of the woman. Reimplantation of an ectopic pregnancy is not a recognized or medically feasible procedure.

Antani chaired the Ohio Republican Party Asian Pacific American Advisory Council and serves on the national board of the Republican State Leadership Committee's Future Majority Project.

=== Committee assignments ===
During the 134th General Assembly, Antani was assigned to the following Ohio Senate committees:

- (Vice Chair of) Health Committee
- Financial Institutions & Technology Committee
- Judiciary Committee
- Transportation Committee

== Electoral history ==
Election results
Year	Office	Election	Votes for Antani	%	Opponent	Party	Votes	%
2014	Ohio House of Representatives	General	20,440	64.50%	Patrick Merris	Democratic	11,248	35.50%
2016	Ohio House of Representatives	General	33,997	63.03%	Patrick Merris	Democratic	19,939	36.97%
2018	Ohio House of Representatives	General	28,079	59.30%	Zach Dickerson	Democratic	19,273	40.70%
2020	Ohio Senate	General	99,096	53.2%	Mark Fogel	Democratic	87,280	46.8%

In July 2024, the Miami Township Board of Trustees unanimously passed a resolution calling for State Senator Niraj Antani's resignation, citing his refusal to support local project funding through the OneTime Strategic Community Investment Fund (OTSCIF) in the state capital budget. Antani defended his stance, arguing that the $700 million surplus allocation was excessive and not in taxpayers' best interests. Antani later attacked the Miami Township Trustees personally saying they didn't understand the legislative process in the Ohio Statehouse and that they were unprofessional, harsh toward him and Antani also insinuated one of the trustees was corrupt with regard to the placement of a park in the township near his personal residence during the public testimony period on August 7th 2024.

== Personal life ==
Outside of the Ohio Senate, Antani is a member of the National Rifle Association of America and Dayton Right to Life. He was a member of the Rotary Club of Miamisburg, is the former President of the Miamisburg High School Alumni Association, and a former executive board member of the non-profit Dayton International Festival, Inc.

In 2015, Niraj was added to Forbes Magazine's list of the top "30 under 30" people in the U.S. for Law & Policy in 2015.

Beginning in 2018, Antani started serving on the national board of the Republican State Leadership Committee's Future Majority Project.

Antani has received the Legislator of the Year Award by the AMVETS Department of Ohio for his work on veterans issues.

He practices Hinduism.
