= Ohio's 12th House of Representatives district =

American legislative district

Ohio's 12th State House of Representatives district
Representative
Brian Stewart; R–Ashville
- Population (2020): 114,076

Ohio's 12th House of Representatives district is currently represented by Republican Brian Stewart. It includes all of Madison and Pickaway counties, and a portion of western Franklin County.

== List of members representing the district ==
Member	Party	Years	General Assembly	Electoral history
District established January 2, 1967.
Bill Mussey (Batavia)	Republican	January 2, 1967 – December 31, 1972	107th 108th 109th	Elected in 1966. Re-elected in 1968. Re-elected in 1970. Retired to run for state senator.
Donna Pope (Parma)	Republican	January 1, 1973 – May 13, 1981	110th 111th 112th 113th 114th	Redistricted from the 51st district and re-elected in 1972. Re-elected in 1974. Re-elected in 1976. Re-elected in 1978. Re-elected in 1980. Resigned to become Director of the United States Mint.
Edna Deffler (Broadview Heights)	Republican	May 13, 1981 – December 31, 1982	114th	Appointed to finish Pope's term.
Troy Lee James (Cleveland)	Democratic	January 3, 1983 – December 31, 1992	115th 116th 117th 118th 119th	Redistricted from the 9th district and re-elected in 1982. Re-elected in 1984. Re-elected in 1986. Re-elected in 1988. Re-elected in 1990. Redistricted to the 10th district.
Vermel Whalen (Cleveland)	Democratic	January 4, 1993 – December 31, 1998	120th 121st 122nd	Redistricted from the 16th district and re-elected in 1992. Re-elected in 1994. Re-elected in 1996. Retired.
John E. Barnes Jr. (Cleveland)	Democratic	January 4, 1999 – February 13, 2002	123rd 124th	Elected in 1998. Re-elected in 2000. Resigned to become Cleveland Director of Community Relations.
Michael DeBose (Cleveland)	Democratic	February 13, 2002 – December 31, 2010	124th 125th 126th 127th 128th	Appointed to finish Barnes' term. Re-elected in 2002. Re-elected in 2004. Re-elected in 2006. Re-elected in 2008. Term-limited.
John E. Barnes Jr. (Cleveland)	Democratic	January 3, 2011 – December 31, 2018	129th 130th 131st 132nd	Elected in 2010. Re-elected in 2012. Re-elected in 2014. Re-elected in 2016. Term-limited.
Juanita Brent (Cleveland)	Democratic	January 7, 2019 – December 31, 2022	133rd 134th	Elected in 2018. Re-elected in 2020. Redistricted to the 22nd district.
Brian Stewart (Ashville)	Republican	January 2, 2023 – present	135th	Redistricted from the 78th district and re-elected in 2022.
