= 2022 Ohio gubernatorial election =

- November 8, 2022
- Turnout: 52.32% (registered voters) ▼3.47pp
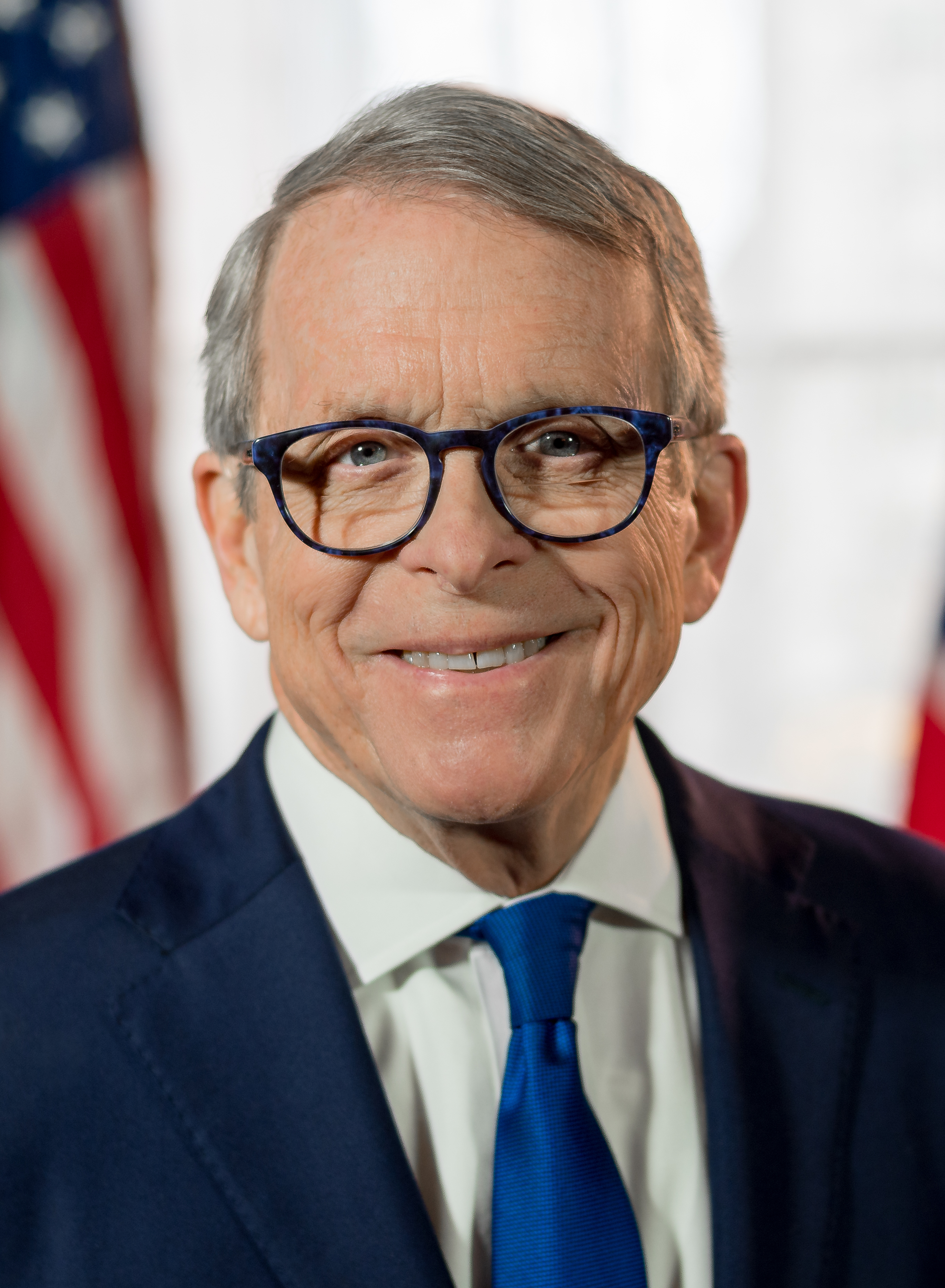

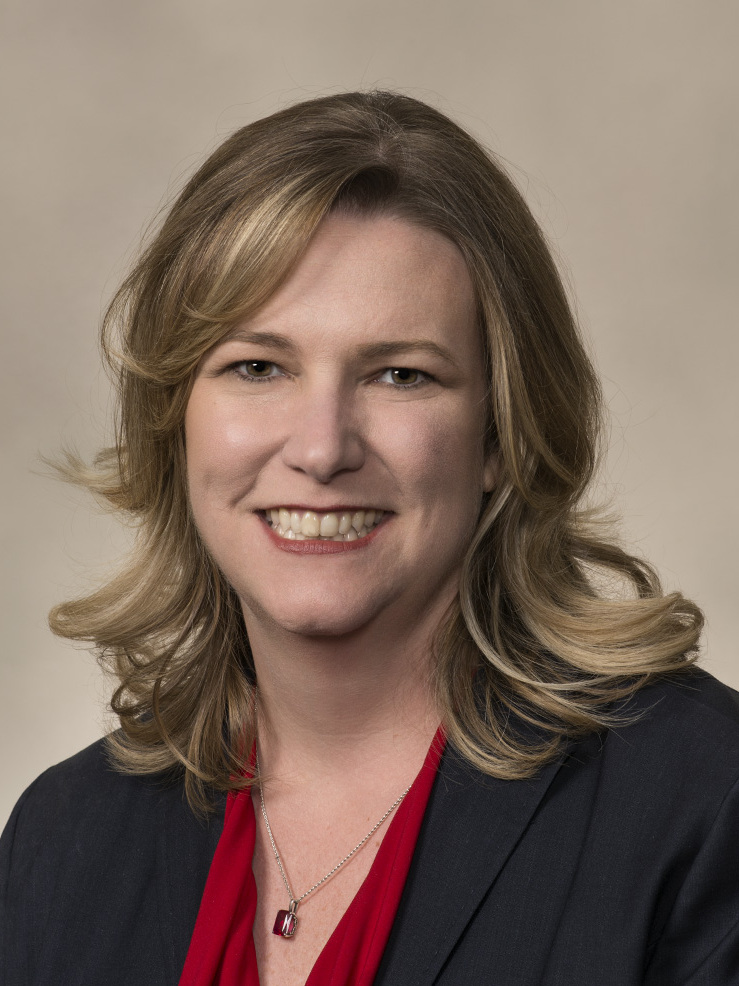
Nominee	Mike DeWine	Nan Whaley
Party	Republican	Democratic
Running mate	Jon Husted	Cheryl Stephens
Popular vote	2,580,424	1,545,489
Percentage	62.41%	37.38%
- DeWine: 50–60% 60–70% 70–80% 80–90% >90% Whaley: 50–60% 60–70% 70–80% 80–90% >90% Tie: 50% No votes
Governor before election
Mike DeWine
Republican
Elected Governor
Mike DeWine
Republican

The 2022 Ohio gubernatorial election was held on November 8, 2022, to elect the governor of Ohio. Incumbent Republican governor Mike DeWine won a second term in a landslide, defeating Democratic nominee Nan Whaley, the former mayor of Dayton, with 62.4% of the vote. DeWine's 25-point victory marked the continuation of a trend in which every incumbent Republican governor of Ohio since 1994 has won re-election by a double-digit margin.

This was the first time since 1994 in which Trumbull and Mahoning counties have gone to the Republican candidate with over 60% of the vote. Hamilton County also voted Republican in a statewide election for the first time since Ohio's 2016 United States Senate election, which incumbent Republican Rob Portman also won by over 20 points and nearly 60% of the vote.

== Republican primary ==
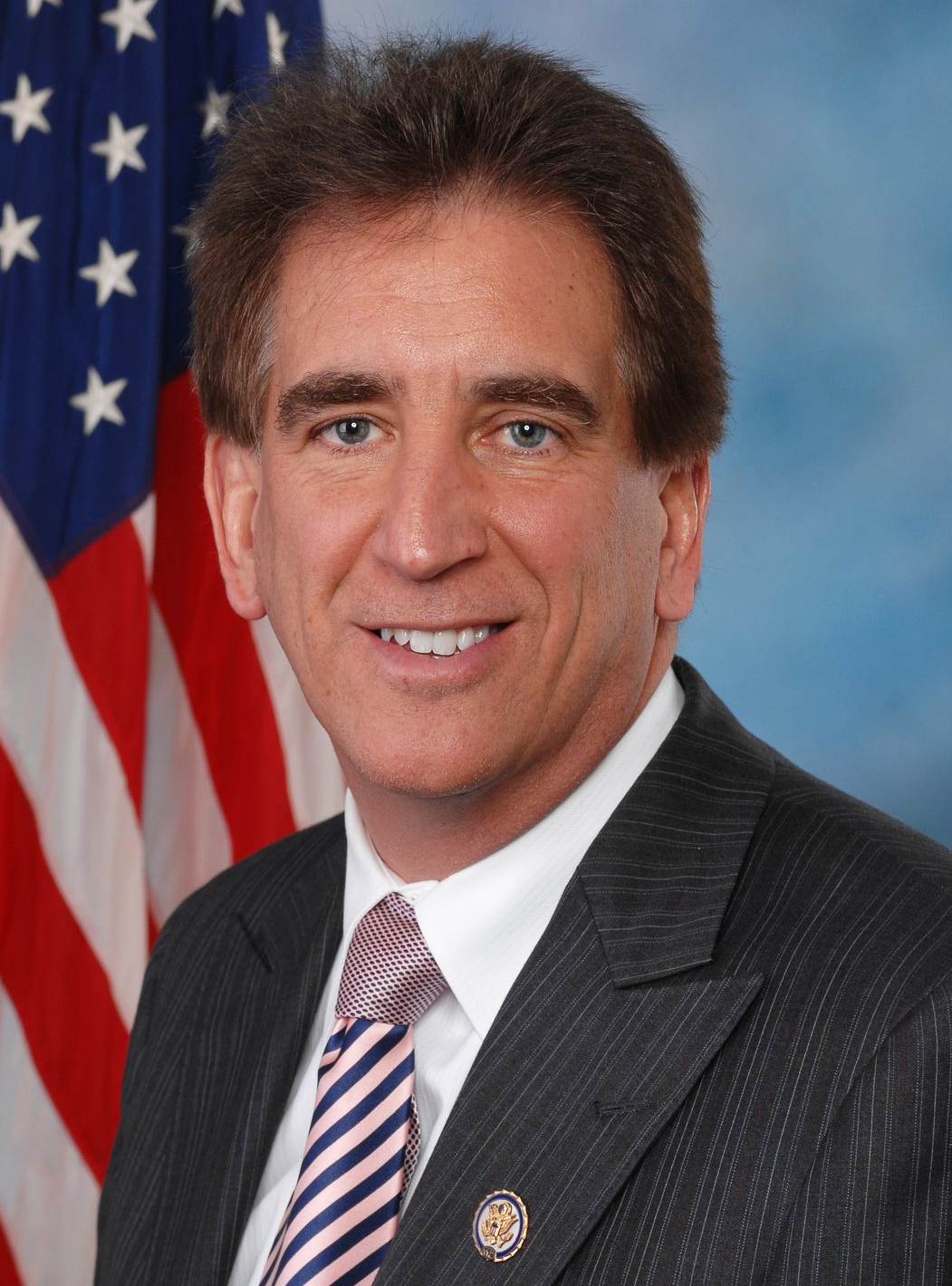
Former U.S. representative Jim Renacci challenged DeWine in the primary.

Incumbent governor Mike DeWine faced backlash from Republicans due to having implemented strict COVID-19 restrictions, such as a statewide stay at home order and mask mandates. Due to this, on April 30, 2021, farmer Joe Blystone became the first candidate to announce a primary challenge to DeWine. On June 9, former U.S. representative Jim Renacci also announced a run, later being followed up by former state representative Ron Hood. As a result, DeWine became the first incumbent Ohio governor to face a primary challenger since Jim Rhodes in 1978 and the first to have multiple challengers since Michael Disalle in 1962. Initial polling showed Renacci in the lead; however, his lead soon evaporated, as DeWine attempted to appeal to conservatives angry with his COVID-19 response by attacking President Joe Biden's policies and signing constitutional carry into law, allowing permitless carry of firearms. Incumbent governors rarely ever lose their primaries. Ultimately, DeWine prevailed in the primary election on May 3; however, he only won with a plurality of the vote, which suggests that he could have lost had his opponents not split the vote.

=== Candidates ===
==== Nominated ====
- Mike DeWine, incumbent governor of Ohio (2019–present), 50th attorney general of Ohio (2011–2019), former U.S. senator from Ohio (1995–2007), 59th lieutenant governor of Ohio, and former U.S. representative for Ohio's 7th congressional district (1983–1991)
  - Running mate: Jon Husted, incumbent lieutenant governor of Ohio (2019–present)

==== Eliminated in primary ====
- Joe Blystone, farmer
  - Running mate: Jeremiah Workman, Iraq War veteran; Restaurateur Joanna Swallen, Blystone's original running mate, withdrew
- Ron Hood, former state representative from the 78th District (2013–2020), 91st District (2005–2006), 57th District (1995–2000), and candidate for OH-15 in 2021
  - Running mate: Candice Keller, former state representative from the 53rd District (2016–2020)
- Jim Renacci, former U.S. representative for Ohio's 16th congressional district (2011–2019) and nominee for U.S. Senate in 2018
  - Running mate: Joe Knopp, Christian film producer

==== Declined ====
- Warren Davidson, U.S. representative for Ohio's 8th congressional district (2016–present) (ran for re-election)
- Jon Husted, lieutenant governor of Ohio (2019–present) (ran for re-election)
- Jim Jordan, U.S. representative for Ohio's 4th congressional district (2007–present) (ran for re-election)
- Josh Mandel, former Ohio state treasurer (2011–2019), nominee for U.S. Senate in 2012, and candidate for U.S. Senate in 2018 (ran for U.S. Senate)
- Dave Yost, Attorney General of Ohio (2019–2026) and former Ohio state auditor (2011–2019) (ran for re-election)

=== Endorsements ===
Mike DeWine

Local officials

- Dennis Clough, mayor of Westlake
- Kevin Corcoran, mayor of North Ridgeville
- Tom Perciak, mayor of Strongsville

Individuals

- Chuck Calvert, former chair of the Medina County Republican Party and former state representative from the 69th district (1999–2006)
- Bryan C. Williams, vice chair of the Ohio Republican Party, chair of the Summit County Republican Party, former acting chair of the Ohio Republican Party, and former state representative from the 41st district (1997–2004)

Labor unions

- National Border Patrol Council

Organizations

- Columbiana County Republican Party
- Franklin County Republican Party
- Ohio Republican Party
- Ohio Restaurant Association
- Ohio Right to Life
- Pike County Republican Party
Jim Renacci

State representatives

- John Becker, former state representative from the 65th district (2013–2020)
- Jennifer Gross, state representative from the 52nd district (2021–present)
- Ron Maag, former state representative from the 62nd district (2013–2016) and the 35th district (2009–2013)
- Seth Morgan, former state representative from the 36th district (2009–2011)
- Nino Vitale, state representative from the 85th district (2015–present)
- Scott Wiggam, state representative from the 1st district (2017–present)

Local officials

- Ron Falconi, mayor of Brunswick
- Bob Meilander, mayor of Kipton

Individuals

- Brad Parscale, campaign manager for Donald J. Trump's 2020 presidential campaign

Organizations

- Butler County Republican Party
- Clermont County Republican Party
- Cuyahoga County Republican Party
- Geauga County Conservative Club
- Lorain County Tea Party
- Ohio Value Voters
- Ohio Women for Trump
- Stand for Health Freedom
- Strongsville Republican Party
Declined to endorse

Organizations

- Hamilton County Republican Party

=== Polling ===
Graphical summary

Source of poll aggregation	Dates administered	Dates updated	Joe Blystone	Mike DeWine	Jim Renacci	Other (Note: Calculated by taking the difference of 100% and all other candidates combined.)	Margin
Real Clear Politics	February 25 – May 1, 2022	May 2, 2022	16.5%	48.0%	31.0%	4.5%	DeWine +17.0

Poll source	Date(s) administered	Sample size (Note: Key: A – all adults RV – registered voters LV – likely voters V – unclear)	Margin of error	Joe Blystone	Mike DeWine	Ron Hood	Jim Renacci	Other	Undecided
The Trafalgar Group (R)	April 29 – May 1, 2022	1,081 (LV)	± 3.0%	19%	47%	2%	27%	–	5%
Emerson College	April 28–29, 2022	885 (LV)	± 3.2%	12%	45%	2%	30%	–	12%
Fox News	April 20–24, 2022	906 (LV)	± 3.0%	19%	43%	–	24%	1%	12%
The Trafalgar Group (R)	April 13–14, 2022	1,078 (LV)	± 3.0%	24%	40%	2%	26%	–	10%
University of Akron	February 17 – March 15, 2022	– (LV)	–	–	51%	–	23%	10%	17%
Fox News	March 2–6, 2022	918 (LV)	± 3.0%	21%	50%	–	18%	<1%	10%
Emerson College	February 25–26, 2022	410 (LV)	± 4.8%	20%	34%	0%	9%	–	36%
The Trafalgar Group (R)	February 1–4, 2022	1,066 (LV)	± 3.0%	20%	41%	–	23%	–	16%
Public Policy Polling (D) (Note: This poll was sponsored by the Democratic Governors Association)	January 25–26, 2022	626 (LV)	± 3.9%	–	38%	–	33%	–	29%
Fabrizio Lee (R) (Note: This poll was sponsored by Renacci's campaign committee)	January 11–13, 2022	800 (LV)	± 3.5%	–	38%	–	46%	–	16%
Fabrizio Lee (R)	May 2021	600 (LV)	± 4.0%	–	34%	–	42%	–	24%

=== Results ===
Results by county: DeWine: 30–40%; 40–50%; 50–60%; 60–70%; Renacci: 30–40%; 40–50%; Blystone: 30–40%; 40–50%; 50–60%

Republican primary results
Party	Candidate	Votes	%
Republican	Mike DeWine (incumbent); Jon Husted (incumbent)	519,594	48.11%
Republican	Jim Renacci; Joe Knopp	302,494	28.01%
Republican	Joe Blystone; Jeremiah Workman	235,584	21.81%
Republican	Ron Hood; Candice Keller	22,411	2.07%
Total votes		1,080,083	100.0%

== Democratic primary ==
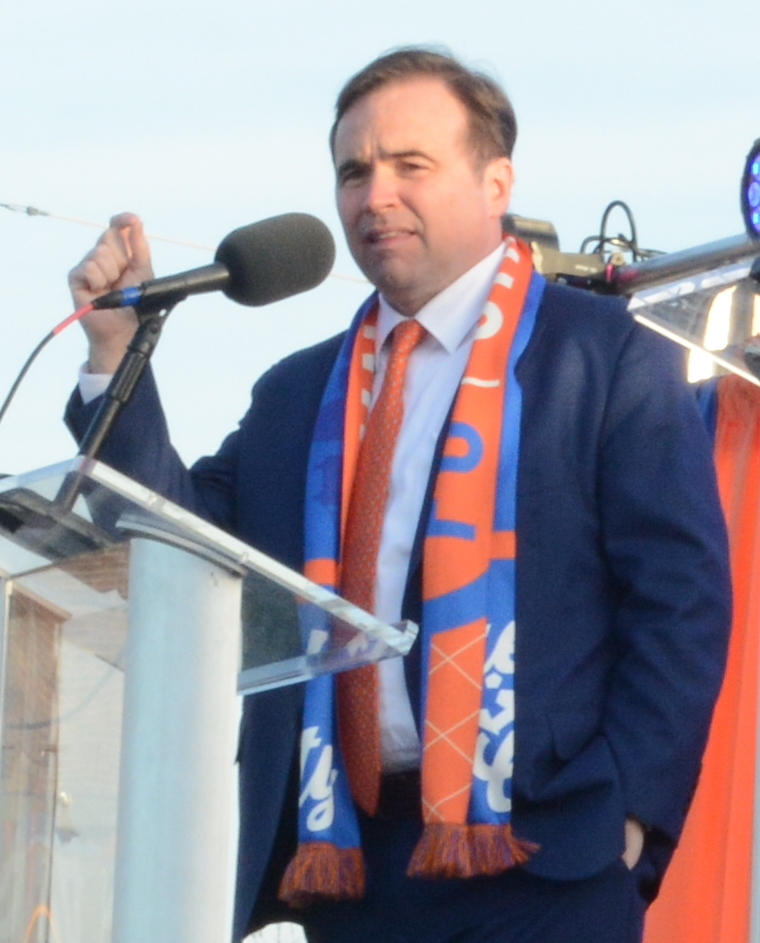
Former Cincinnati Mayor John Cranley finished second in the primary.

=== Candidates ===
==== Nominated ====
- Nan Whaley, former mayor of Dayton (2014–2022) and candidate in 2018
  - Running mate: Cheryl Stephens, Cuyahoga County Council vice president

==== Eliminated in primary ====
- John Cranley, former mayor of Cincinnati (2013–2022) and nominee for OH-01 in 2000 and 2006
  - Running mate: Teresa Fedor, state senator from Ohio's 11th senatorial district

==== Withdrawn ====
- Ted Williams, voice-over artist

==== Declined ====
- Tim Ryan, U.S. representative for Ohio's 13th congressional district (2003–2023) and candidate for U.S. President in 2020 (ran for U.S. Senate)
- Emilia Sykes, Minority Leader of the Ohio House of Representatives (2019–2021) and state representative (2015–2023) (successfully ran for Rep of the U.S. House in Ohio's 13th congressional district)

=== Endorsements ===
John Cranley

State senators

- Eric Kearney, former state senator from the 9th district (2005–2014)
- Rhine McLin, former state senator from the 5th district (1995–2001); former mayor of Dayton (2002–2010)
- Ray Miller, former state senator from the 15th district (2003–2010)
- Cecil Thomas, state senator from the 9th district (2015–present)

State representatives

- Nick Celebrezze, former state representative from the 15th district (2012–2019)
- Sedrick Denson, state representative from the 33rd district (2019–present)
- Dan Dodd, former state representative from the 91st district (2007–2010)
- Jessica Miranda, state representative from the 28th district (2019–present)
- Michael O'Brien, state representative from the 64th district (2015–present)

Individuals

- Gloria Steinem, feminist political activist

Newspapers

- The Plain Dealer, Cleveland
- The Toledo Blade
Nan Whaley

U.S. senators

- Sherrod Brown, U.S. senator from Ohio (2007–present), former U.S. representative for OH-13 (1993–2007)

State senators

- Nickie Antonio, state senator from the 23rd district (2019–present)
- Tina Maharath, state senator from the 3rd district (2019–present)

State representatives

- Willis Blackshear Jr., state representative from the 39th district (2021–present)
- Kristin Boggs, state representative from the 18th district (2016–present)
- Janine Boyd, state representative from the 9th district (2015–present)
- Juanita Brent, state representative from the 12th district (2019–present)
- Rich Brown, state representative from the 20th district (2017–present)
- Randi Clites, former state representative from the 75th district (2019–2020)
- Paula Hicks-Hudson, state representative from the 44th district (2019–present) and former mayor of Toledo (2015–2018)
- David J. Leland, state representative from the 22nd district (1983–1984, 2015–present)
- Michele Lepore-Hagan, state representative for Ohio's 58th district (2015–present)
- Mary Lightbody, state representative from the 19th district (2019–present)
- Beth Liston, state representative from the 21st district (2019–present)
- Adam Miller, state representative from the 17th district (2017–present)
- Joe Miller, state representative from the 56th district (2019–present)
- Dan Ramos, former state representative from the 56th district (2011–present)
- Phil Robinson, state representative from the 6th district (2019–present)
- Allison Russo, state representative from the 24th district (2019–present) and Minority Leader of the Ohio House of Representatives (2022–2025)
- Michael Sheehy, state representative from the 46th district (2013–present)
- Michael J. Skindell, state representative from the 13th district (2019–present)
- Kent Smith, state representative from the 8th district (2015–present)
- Monique Smith, state representative from the 16th district (2021–present)
- Lisa Sobecki, state representative from the 45th district (2019–present)
- Bride Rose Sweeney, state representative from the 14th district (2018–present)
- Casey Weinstein, state representative from the 37th district (2019–present)

Local officials

- Andrew Ginther, mayor of Columbus
- Dan Horrigan, mayor of Akron
- Frank G. Jackson, former mayor of Cleveland
- Wade Kapszukiewicz, mayor of Toledo

Individuals

- Joe Rugola, executive director of the Ohio Association of Public School Employees (OAPSE)

Unions

- Industrial Division of the Communication Workers of America
- Ohio Association of Public School Employees

Organizations

- 314 Action
- EMILY's List
- The Matriots PAC
Declined to endorse

Organizations

- Ohio Democratic Party

=== Polling ===
Poll source	Date(s) administered	Sample size	Margin of error	John Cranley	Nan Whaley	Other	Undecided
University of Akron	February 17 – March 15, 2022	– (LV)	–	18%	23%	6%	54%
Emerson College	February 25–26, 2022	313 (LV)	± 5.5%	16%	16%	–	69%
Clarity Campaign Labs (D) (Note: This poll was sponsored by Whaley's campaign)	January 17–19, 2022	670 (LV)	± 3.8%	20%	33%	–	48%

=== Results ===
Results by county: Whaley: 50–60%; 60–70%; 70–80%; 80–90%; Cranley: 50–60%; 60–70%

Democratic primary results
Party	Candidate	Votes	%
Democratic	Nan Whaley; Cheryl Stephens	331,014	65.01%
Democratic	John Cranley; Teresa Fedor	178,132	34.99%
Total votes		509,146	100.0%

== Independents ==
=== Disqualified ===
- F. Patrick Cunnane
  - Running mate: Mary Cunnane
- Niel Petersen, pastor
  - Running mate: Michael V Stewart

== Write-in candidates ==
=== Declared ===
- Timothy Grady, college student
  - Running mate: Dayna Bickley
- Craig Patton
  - Running mate: Collin Cook
- Renea Turner
  - Running mate: Adina Pelletier
- Marshall Usher
  - Running mate: Shannon Walker

=== Endorsements ===
Timothy Grady

Individuals

- Vermin Supreme, former Libertarian National Committee member

== General election ==
=== Predictions ===
Source	Ranking	As of
The Cook Political Report	Solid R	September 29, 2022
Inside Elections	Solid R	July 22, 2022
Sabato's Crystal Ball	Safe R	June 2, 2022
Politico	Solid R	November 3, 2022
RCP	Safe R	October 20, 2022
Fox News	Likely R	May 12, 2022
538	Solid R	July 31, 2022
Elections Daily	Safe R	November 7, 2022

=== Post-primary endorsements ===
Mike DeWine (R)

U.S. executive branch officials

- Donald Trump, 45th president of the United States (2017–2021)

State officials

- Keith Faber, Auditor of Ohio (2019–present)
- Frank LaRose, Secretary of State of Ohio (2019–present)
- Robert Sprague, Treasurer of Ohio (2019–present)
- Dave Yost, Attorney General of Ohio (2019–2026)

State senators

- Frank Hoagland, state senator from the 30th district (2017–2023)

Individuals

- JD Vance, author and Republican nominee in the 2022 United States Senate election in Ohio

Newspapers

- The Marietta Times (local newspaper from the city of Marietta, Ohio)
- The Toledo Blade

Organizations

- Ohio Fraternal Order of Police

Unions

- Cleveland Building and Construction Trades Council
- Affiliated Construction Trades of Ohio
Nan Whaley (D)

Newspapers

- The Columbus Dispatch

Unions

- National Education Association

=== Polling ===
Aggregate polls

Source of poll aggregation	Dates administered	Dates updated	Mike DeWine (R)	Nan Whaley (D)	Undecided (Note: Calculated by taking the difference of 100% and all other candidates combined.)	Margin
Real Clear Politics	October 7–22, 2022	October 25, 2022	55.8%	37.5%	6.7%	DeWine +18.3
FiveThirtyEight	August 16 – October 25, 2022	October 25, 2022	55.5%	36.1%	8.4%	DeWine +19.3
Average			55.6%	36.8%	7.6%	DeWine +18.8

Graphical summary

Poll source	Date(s) administered	Sample size	Margin of error	Mike DeWine (R)	Nan Whaley (D)	Other	Undecided
Civiqs	November 4–7, 2022	716 (LV)	± 4.1%	53%	39%	6% (Note: "Someone else" with 6%)	2%
Research Co.	November 4–6, 2022	450 (LV)	± 4.6%	57%	37%	–	6%
Targoz Market Research	November 2–6, 2022	505 (LV)	± 4.3%	62%	32%	5% (Note: "All others" with 5%)	–
The Trafalgar Group (R)	November 3–5, 2022	1,123 (LV)	± 2.9%	59%	34%	–	8%
Data for Progress (D)	November 2–5, 2022	1,413 (LV)	± 3.0%	62%	38%	–	–
Cygnal (R)	November 1–3, 2022	1,498 (LV)	± 2.5%	56%	37%	–	7%
Remington Research Group (R)	November 1–2, 2022	1,125 (LV)	± 2.8%	58%	35%	–	7%
Emerson College	October 30 – November 1, 2022	1,000 (LV)	± 3.0%	55%	34%	5% (Note: "Someone else" with 5%)	7%
Cygnal (R)	October 29 – November 1, 2022	1,520 (LV)	± 2.5%	56%	36%	–	8%
Cygnal (R)	October 26–30, 2022	1,510 (LV)	± 2.5%	56%	36%	–	9%
Cygnal (R)	October 24–28, 2022	1,776 (LV)	± 2.3%	56%	35%	–	9%
Cygnal (R)	October 22–26, 2022	1,817 (LV)	± 2.3%	56%	35%	–	9%
Cygnal (R)	October 20–24, 2022	1,886 (LV)	± 2.3%	55%	37%	–	8%
Baldwin Wallace University	October 20–23, 2022	1,068 (LV)	± 3.5%	57%	40%	–	3%
Cygnal (R)	October 18–22, 2022	1,547 (LV)	± 2.5%	55%	37%	–	8%
Marist College	October 17–20, 2022	1,141 (RV)	± 3.9%	53%	40%	1% (Note: "Another party's candidate" with 1%)	6%
Marist College	October 17–20, 2022	942 (LV)	± 4.3%	54%	41%	1% (Note: "Another party's candidate" with 1%)	3%
Cygnal (R)	October 16–20, 2022	1,540 (LV)	± 2.5%	55%	37%	–	8%
Siena College	October 14–19, 2022	644 (LV)	± 5.1%	58%	34%	3% (Note: "Another candidate" with 2%; "Not going to vote" with 1%)	6%
Cygnal (R)	October 14–18, 2022	1,438 (LV)	± 2.6%	56%	35%	–	9%
Ohio Northern University/Lucid	October 11–15, 2022	668 (LV)	± 3.8%	60%	29%	1% (Note: "Other" with 1%)	10%
Suffolk University	October 11–15, 2022	500 (LV)	± 4.4%	56%	38%	1% (Note: "Someone else" with 1%)	5%
The Trafalgar Group (R)	October 10–12, 2022	1,081 (LV)	± 2.9%	55%	37%	–	8%
Data for Progress (D)	October 7–12, 2022	1,016 (LV)	± 3.0%	57%	38%	–	5%
Cygnal (R) (Note: This poll was sponsored by American Greatness)	October 6–8, 2022	640 (LV)	–	57%	35%	–	8%
Emerson College	October 6–7, 2022	1,000 (LV)	± 3.0%	50%	36%	6% (Note: "Someone else" with 6%)	8%
Siena College	September 18–22, 2022	642 (LV)	± 4.4%	55%	32%	3% (Note: "Another candidate" with 2%; "Not going to vote" with 1%)	10%
Baldwin Wallace University	September 12–15, 2022	855 (LV)	± 4.1%	57%	39%	–	4%
Marist College	September 12–15, 2022	1,200 (RV)	± 3.6%	55%	37%	–	8%
Marist College	September 12–15, 2022	1,009 (LV)	± 3.9%	55%	39%	–	6%
Emerson College	September 10–13, 2022	1000 (LV)	± 3%	50%	33%	5%	12%
Civiqs	September 10–13, 2022	780 (LV)	± 4%	44%	41%	10%	5%
Fallon Research	September 6–11, 2022	500 (RV)	± 4.3%	49%	37%	–	14%
Suffolk University	September 5–7, 2022	500 (LV)	± 4.4%	54%	39%	–	7%
Echelon Insights	August 31 – September 7, 2022	831 (LV)	± 4.3%	54%	35%	–	11%
Survey Monkey (D) (Note: This poll was sponsored by Center Street PAC, which opposes DeWine)	August 31 – September 2, 2022	987 (RV)	± 3.0%	52%	31%	–	17%
Survey Monkey (D)	August 31 – September 2, 2022	519 (LV)	± 3.0%	53%	37%	–	10%
The Trafalgar Group (R)	August 16–19, 2022	1,087 (LV)	± 2.9%	54%	38%	–	8%
Emerson College	August 15–16, 2022	925 (LV)	± 3.2%	49%	33%	8%	11%
Lake Research Partners (D) (Note: This poll was circulated by the Ohio Democratic Party)	August 4–9, 2022	600 (LV)	± 4.0%	44%	43%	8%	5%
Lake Research Partners (D)	August 3–9, 2022	600 (LV)	± 4.0%	44%	43%	7%	6%
Suffolk University	May 22–24, 2022	500 (LV)	± 4.4%	45%	30%	11% (Note: Petersen with 11%, "someone else" with 1%)	13%
Redfield & Wilton Strategies	August 20–24, 2021	1,200 (RV)	± 2.8%	44%	25%	10%	16%
Redfield & Wilton Strategies	August 20–24, 2021	1,160 (LV)	± 2.9%	46%	27%	11%	16%

Hypothetical polling

Mike DeWine vs. John Cranley

Poll source	Date(s) administered	Sample size	Margin of error	Mike DeWine (R)	John Cranley (D)	Other	Undecided
Redfield & Wilton Strategies	August 20–24, 2021	1,200 (RV)	± 2.8%	44%	24%	10%	16%
Redfield & Wilton Strategies	August 20–24, 2021	1,160 (LV)	± 2.9%	47%	25%	11%	15%

=== Results ===
State Senate district results

State House district results

According to a survey conducted by NORC for Fox News and the Associated Press, most white people (68% to 32%), Latinos (64% to 33%), and other minorities (60% to 36%) voted for DeWine, while most African Americans voted for Whaley (73% to 27%).

2022 Ohio gubernatorial election
Party	Candidate	Votes	%	±%
Republican	Mike DeWine (incumbent); Jon Husted (incumbent)	2,580,424	62.41%	+12.02%
Democratic	Nan Whaley; Cheryl Stephens	1,545,489	37.38%	−9.30%
Write-in		8,964	0.22%	N/A
Total votes		4,134,877	100.0%	
Turnout		4,201,368	52.32%	
Registered electors		8,029,950		
Republican hold				

==== By county ====
County	Mike DeWine Republican		Nan Whaley Democratic		Various candidates Other parties		Margin		Total
County	#	%	#	%	#	%	#	%	Total
Adams	7,348	83.83%	1,395	15.92%	22	0.25%	5,953	67.91%	8,765
Allen	25,461	77.97%	6,835	20.93%	360	1.10%	18,626	57.04%	32,656
Ashland	14,510	79.10%	3,729	20.33%	105	0.57%	10,781	58.77%	18,344
Ashtabula	20,903	68.16%	9,621	31.37%	142	0.46%	11,282	36.79%	30,666
Athens	8,920	46.63%	10,155	53.08%	55	0.29%	-1,235	-6.45%	19,130
Auglaize	16,019	85.80%	2,474	13.25%	178	0.96%	13,545	72.55%	18,671
Belmont	16,884	74.74%	5,546	24.55%	161	0.70%	11,338	50.19%	22,591
Brown	11,658	82.42%	2,372	16.77%	114	0.81%	9,286	65.65%	14,144
Butler	90,063	70.12%	38,186	29.73%	199	0.15%	51,877	40.39%	128,448
Carroll	8,074	79.51%	1,969	19.39%	112	1.11%	6,105	60.12%	10,155
Champaign	11,324	78.34%	2,962	20.49%	169	1.17%	8,362	57.85%	14,455
Clark	31,121	70.88%	12,559	28.60%	228	0.51%	18,562	42.28%	43,908
Clermont	59,153	73.54%	20,888	25.97%	395	0.49%	38,265	47.57%	80,436
Clinton	11,479	81.05%	2,583	18.24%	101	0.71%	8,896	62.81%	14,163
Columbiana	28,013	78.93%	7,169	20.20%	311	0.87%	20,844	58.73%	35,493
Coshocton	8,901	78.44%	2,369	20.88%	78	0.69%	6,532	57.56%	11,348
Crawford	11,781	79.43%	2,949	19.88%	101	0.68%	8,832	59.55%	14,831
Cuyahoga	175,697	42.73%	234,076	56.93%	1,389	0.34%	-58,379	-14.20%	411,162
Darke	17,278	86.96%	2,464	12.40%	128	0.65%	14,814	74.56%	19,870
Defiance	10,180	75.87%	3,139	23.40%	98	0.73%	7,041	52.47%	13,417
Delaware	62,733	63.49%	35,942	36.37%	137	0.14%	26,791	27.12%	98,812
Erie	18,651	64.31%	10,236	35.30%	113	0.39%	8,415	29.01%	29,000
Fairfield	41,017	69.53%	17,842	30.25%	129	0.22%	23,175	39.28%	58,988
Fayette	6,913	81.88%	1,476	17.48%	54	0.64%	5,437	64.40%	8,443
Franklin	182,914	42.87%	242,332	56.79%	1,464	0.34%	-59,418	-13.92%	426,710
Fulton	13,008	79.22%	3,324	20.24%	88	0.53%	9,684	58.98%	16,420
Gallia	7,229	79.72%	1,677	18.49%	162	1.79%	5,552	61.23%	9,068
Geauga	28,931	67.97%	13,344	31.35%	289	0.68%	15,587	36.62%	42,564
Greene	45,787	68.90%	20,565	30.95%	101	0.15%	25,222	37.95%	66,453
Guernsey	9,486	78.04%	2,530	20.81%	139	1.14%	6,956	57.23%	12,155
Hamilton	155,577	51.18%	148,023	48.70%	371	0.12%	7,554	2.48%	303,971
Hancock	20,975	77.07%	6,127	22.51%	114	0.42%	14,848	54.56%	27,216
Hardin	7,210	80.42%	1,717	19.15%	38	0.42%	5,493	61.27%	8,965
Harrison	4,079	78.61%	1,072	20.66%	38	0.73%	3,007	57.95%	5,189
Henry	8,437	80.87%	1,949	18.68%	47	0.45%	6,488	62.19%	10,433
Highland	10,880	83.31%	2,114	16.19%	65	0.50%	8,766	67.12%	13,059
Hocking	7,046	73.83%	2,405	25.20%	92	0.96%	4,641	48.63%	9,543
Holmes	7,262	85.96%	1,115	13.20%	71	0.84%	6,147	72.76%	8,448
Huron	13,904	75.06%	4,464	24.10%	155	0.84%	9,440	50.96%	18,523
Jackson	7,033	79.38%	1,749	19.74%	78	0.88%	5,284	59.64%	8,860
Jefferson	16,929	73.90%	5,855	25.56%	123	0.53%	11,074	48.34%	22,907
Knox	17,349	75.22%	5,525	23.95%	191	0.83%	11,824	51.27%	23,065
Lake	61,121	64.66%	33,098	35.01%	308	0.33%	28,023	29.65%	94,527
Lawrence	13,602	77.86%	3,815	21.84%	52	0.30%	9,787	56.02%	17,469
Licking	46,881	70.54%	19,143	28.80%	439	0.66%	27,738	41.74%	66,463
Logan	13,553	82.05%	2,777	16.81%	188	1.14%	10,776	65.24%	16,518
Lorain	66,289	59.69%	44,314	39.90%	446	0.40%	21,975	19.79%	111,049
Lucas	72,214	54.14%	60,516	45.37%	661	0.50%	11,698	8.77%	133,391
Madison	10,783	76.25%	3,244	22.94%	115	0.81%	7,539	53.31%	14,142
Mahoning	55,676	65.20%	29,444	34.48%	276	0.32%	26,232	30.72%	85,396
Marion	14,263	74.17%	4,818	25.05%	149	0.78%	9,445	49.12%	19,230
Medina	53,498	68.47%	24,034	30.76%	604	0.78%	29,464	37.71%	78,136
Meigs	5,755	78.20%	1,519	20.64%	85	1.15%	4,236	57.56%	7,359
Mercer	15,403	86.89%	2,230	12.58%	104	0.53%	13,173	74.31%	17,727
Miami	33,709	79.46%	8,452	19.92%	261	0.62%	25,257	59.54%	42,422
Monroe	3,793	77.97%	1,022	21.01%	50	1.03%	2,771	56.96%	4,865
Montgomery	110,672	59.05%	76,154	40.63%	603	0.32%	34,518	18.42%	187,429
Morgan	3,808	79.35%	958	19.96%	33	0.69%	2,850	59.39%	4,799
Morrow	10,698	80.52%	2,475	18.63%	113	0.85%	8,223	61.89%	13,286
Muskingum	21,064	76.76%	6,230	22.70%	149	0.54%	14,834	54.06%	27,443
Noble	3,785	81.93%	778	16.84%	57	1.24%	3,007	65.09%	4,620
Ottawa	13,312	71.79%	5,171	27.89%	60	0.32%	8,141	43.90%	18,543
Paulding	5,169	79.58%	1,285	19.78%	41	0.63%	3,884	59.80%	6,495
Perry	9,263	78.31%	2,515	21.26%	50	0.43%	6,748	57.05%	11,828
Pickaway	15,209	77.45%	4,289	21.84%	139	0.71%	10,920	55.61%	19,637
Pike	5,889	75.66%	1,842	23.67%	52	0.67%	4,047	51.99%	7,783
Portage	37,634	62.15%	22,665	37.43%	255	0.42%	14,969	24.72%	60,554
Preble	13,172	83.38%	2,504	15.85%	121	0.77%	10,668	67.53%	15,797
Putnam	13,402	89.09%	1,550	10.30%	92	0.62%	11,852	78.79%	15,044
Richland	30,899	74.46%	10,429	25.13%	170	0.41%	20,470	49.33%	41,498
Ross	16,496	72.79%	6,037	26.64%	130	0.57%	10,459	46.15%	22,663
Sandusky	15,712	73.10%	5,631	26.20%	150	0.70%	10,081	46.90%	21,493
Scioto	15,934	75.84%	5,048	24.03%	29	0.14%	10,886	51.81%	21,011
Seneca	13,667	75.45%	4,319	23.84%	129	0.71%	9,348	51.61%	18,115
Shelby	15,717	86.69%	2,291	12.64%	122	0.67%	13,426	74.05%	18,130
Stark	90,387	67.49%	43,082	32.17%	463	0.35%	47,305	35.32%	133,932
Summit	105,777	53.20%	92,206	46.37%	854	0.43%	13,571	6.83%	198,837
Trumbull	48,459	66.48%	24,163	33.15%	268	0.37%	24,296	33.33%	72,890
Tuscarawas	22,296	73.64%	7,685	25.38%	294	0.97%	14,611	48.26%	30,275
Union	18,387	72.10%	6,918	27.13%	196	0.77%	11,469	44.97%	25,501
Van Wert	8,279	82.22%	1,702	16.90%	88	0.88%	6,577	65.32%	10,069
Vinton	3,111	77.87%	832	20.83%	52	1.30%	2,279	57.04%	3,995
Warren	74,345	72.95%	27,070	26.56%	493	0.48%	47,275	46.39%	101,908
Washington	16,934	74.79%	5,625	24.84%	82	0.37%	11,309	49.95%	22,641
Wayne	28,284	73.76%	9,824	25.62%	238	0.63%	18,460	48.14%	38,346
Williams	10,331	79.99%	2,543	19.69%	41	0.32%	7,788	60.30%	12,915
Wood	31,399	64.67%	17,060	35.14%	95	0.20%	14,339	29.53%	48,554
Wyandot	6,537	80.17%	1,558	19.11%	59	0.71%	4,979	61.06%	8,154
Totals	2,580,685	62.27%	1,545,688	37.30%	17,951	0.43%	1,034,997	24.97%	4,144,324

Counties that flipped from Democratic to Republican

- Hamilton (largest city: Cincinnati)
- Lorain (largest city: Lorain)
- Lucas (largest city: Toledo)
- Mahoning (largest city: Youngstown)
- Summit (largest city: Akron)
- Trumbull (largest city: Warren)

==== By congressional district ====
DeWine won 13 of 15 congressional districts, including three that elected Democrats.

District	DeWine	Whaley	Representative
1st	55%	45%	Steve Chabot (117th Congress)
1st	55%	45%	Greg Landsman (118th Congress)
2nd	77%	23%	Brad Wenstrup
3rd	37%	63%	Joyce Beatty
4th	74%	26%	Jim Jordan
5th	71%	29%	Bob Latta
6th	72%	28%	Bill Johnson
7th	63%	37%	Bob Gibbs (117th Congress)
7th	63%	37%	Max Miller (118th Congress)
8th	69%	31%	Warren Davidson
9th	63%	37%	Marcy Kaptur
10th	62%	38%	Mike Turner
11th	30%	70%	Shontel Brown
12th	72%	28%	Troy Balderson
13th	57%	43%	Tim Ryan (117th Congress)
13th	57%	43%	Emilia Sykes (118th Congress)
14th	66%	34%	David Joyce
15th	62%	38%	Mike Carey

== Analysis ==
=== Voter demographics ===
Voter demographic data was collected by CNN. The voter survey is based on exit polls. There were 3,772 total respondents.

2022 Ohio gubernatorial election (CNN)
Demographic subgroup	DeWine	Whaley	% of total vote
Ideology
Liberals	13	86	20
Moderates	57	42	42
Conservatives	93	6	38
Party
Democrats	16	84	30
Republicans	96	3	41
Independents	62	37	29
Age
18–24 years old	44	56	4
25–29 years old	40	60	6
30–39 years old	51	48	12
40–49 years old	60	38	16
50–64 years old	68	31	31
65 and older	68	32	31
Gender
Men	66	33	52
Women	58	41	48
Marital status
Married	64	35	65
Unmarried	56	42	35
Marital status by gender
Married men	70	29	31
Married women	58	41	34
Unmarried men	59	39	18
Unmarried women	53	46	17
Race/ethnicity
White	67	32	84
Black	32	67	12
Latino	48	52	2
Gender by race
White men	70	29	44
White women	64	35	40
Black men	41	59	6
Black women	25	75	6
Latino men	N/A	N/A	1
Latino women	N/A	N/A	1
Other racial/ethnic groups	N/A	N/A	2
Education
Never attended college	68	32	17
Some college education	64	35	25
Associate degree	63	36	15
Bachelor's degree	58	40	25
Advanced degree	58	41	18
Education by race
White college graduates	61	38	37
White no college degree	72	27	46
Non-white college graduates	44	56	6
Non-white no college degree	37	63	11
Education by gender/race
White women with college degrees	57	42	18
White women without college degrees	69	30	21
White men with college degrees	65	34	19
White men without college degrees	74	25	25
Non-white	39	60	16
Issue regarded as most important
Crime	66	34	8
Inflation	81	18	35
Immigration	92	6	9
Gun policy	56	42	16
Abortion	28	71	26
Abortion should be
Legal	43	56	58
Illegal	89	9	37
2020 presidential vote
Biden	20	79	43
Trump	95	3	50
Biden legitimately won in 2020
Yes	37	63	57
No	95	3	39
Union household
Yes	56	43	21
No	62	37	79
Area type
Urban	53	46	33
Suburban	68	31	51
Rural	62	38	16

== See also ==
- 2022 Ohio elections

== Notes ==
Partisan clients
