= Ohio's 78th House of Representatives district =

American legislative district

Ohio's 78th State House of Representatives district
Representative
Susan Manchester; R–Waynesfield
- Population (2020): 113,287

Ohio's 78th House of Representatives district is currently represented by Republican Susan Manchester. It includes all of Allen County and a portion of northern Auglaize County.

== List of members representing the district ==
Member	Party	Years	General Assembly	Electoral history
District established January 2, 1967.
James Holzemer (Toledo)	Democratic	January 2, 1967 – December 31, 1968	107th	Elected in 1966. Retired to run for Lucas County Commissioner.
Casey Jones (Toledo)	Democratic	January 6, 1969 – December 31, 1972	108th 109th	Elected in 1968. Re-elected in 1970. Redistricted to the 45th district.
Rodney Hughes (Bellefontaine)	Republican	January 1, 1973 – December 31, 1976	110th 111th 112th 113th 114th	Redistricted from the 8th district and re-elected in 1972. Re-elected in 1974. Re-elected in 1976. Re-elected in 1978. Re-elected in 1980. Redistricted to the 83rd district.
Steve Williams (Lancaster)	Republican	January 3, 1977 – December 31, 1990	115th 116th 117th 118th	Redistricted from the 90th district and re-elected in 1982. Re-elected in 1984. Re-elected in 1986. Re-elected in 1988. Retired to run for state senator.
Jon D. Myers (Lancaster)	Republican	January 7, 1991 – December 31, 1992	119th	Elected in 1990. Redistricted to the 6th district.
Mary Abel (Athens)	Democratic	January 4, 1993 – December 31, 1996	120th 121st	Redistricted from the 94th district and re-elected in 1992. Re-elected in 1994. Lost re-election.
Larry Householder (Glenford)	Republican	January 6, 1997 – December 31, 2002	122nd 123rd 124th	Elected in 1996. Re-elected in 1998. Re-elected in 2000. Redistricted to the 91st district.
Derrick Seaver (Minster)	Democratic	January 6, 2003 – November 18, 2004	125th 126th	Redistricted from the 85th district and re-elected in 2002. Re-elected in 2004. Retired.
Derrick Seaver (Minster)	Republican	November 18, 2004 – December 31, 2006	125th 126th	Redistricted from the 85th district and re-elected in 2002. Re-elected in 2004. Retired.
John Adams (Sidney)	Republican	January 1, 2007 – December 31, 2012	127th 128th 129th	Elected in 2006. Re-elected in 2008. Re-elected in 2010. Redistricted to the 85th district.
Ron Hood (Ashville)	Republican	January 7, 2013 – December 31, 2020	130th 131st 132nd 133rd	Elected in 2012. Re-elected in 2014. Re-elected in 2016. Re-elected in 2018. Term-limited.
Brian Stewart (Ashville)	Republican	January 4, 2021 – December 31, 2022	134th	Elected in 2020. Redistricted to the 12th district.
Susan Manchester (Waynesfield)	Republican	January 2, 2023 – present	135th	Redistricted from the 84th district and re-elected in 2022. Ran for Ohio Senate
Matt Huffman (Tipp City)	Republican	January 6, 2025 – present	136th	Elected in 2024.

== Election results ==
=== 2020 ===
Democratic primary
Party	Candidate	Votes	%
Democratic	Charlotte Owens	4,613	100.0
Total votes		4,613	100.0

Republican primary
Party	Candidate	Votes	%
Republican	Brian Stewart	7,820	66.9
Republican	Bobby Mitchell	2,939	25.2
Republican	Aaron Adams	924	7.9
Total votes		11,683	100.0

Ohio's 78th House District General Election, 2020
Party	Candidate	Votes	%
Republican	Brian Stewart	42,314	72.71%
Democratic	Charlotte Owens	15,878	27.29%
Total votes		58,192	100.0
Republican hold			

=== 2018 ===
Ohio House of Representatives General Election, 2018
Party	Candidate	Votes	%
Republican	Ron Hood	29,188	67.82
Democratic	Amber Daniels	13,848	32.18

=== 2016 ===
Ohio House of Representatives General Election, 2016
Party	Candidate	Votes	%
Republican	Ron Hood	37,755	100.00

=== 2014 ===
Ohio House of Representatives General Election, 2014
Party	Candidate	Votes	%
Republican	Ron Hood	20,281	65.92
Democratic	Lina Fetherolf Rogers	10,487	34.08

=== 2012 ===
Ohio House of Representatives General Election, 2012
Party	Candidate	Votes	%
Republican	Ron Hood	28,885	57.55
Democratic	Jeremy VanMeter	21,309	42.45

=== 2010 ===
Ohio House of Representatives General Election, 2010
Party	Candidate	Votes	%
Republican	John Adams	31,358	74.27
Democratic	Anthony Ehresmann	10,864	25.73

=== 2008 ===
Ohio House of Representatives General Election, 2008
Party	Candidate	Votes	%
Republican	John Adams	44,838	100.00

=== 2006 ===
Ohio House of Representatives General Election, 2006
Party	Candidate	Votes	%
Republican	John Adams	22,352	52.37
Democratic	Adam Ward	20,329	47.63

=== 2004 ===
Ohio House of Representatives General Election, 2004
Party	Candidate	Votes	%
Democratic	Derrick Seaver	42,739	100.00

=== 2002 ===
Ohio House of Representatives General Election, 2002
Party	Candidate	Votes	%
Democratic	Derrick Seaver	20,434	58.28
Republican	John Adams	14,630	41.72

=== 2000 ===
Ohio House of Representatives General Election, 2000
Party	Candidate	Votes	%
Republican	Larry Householder	25,437	52.8
Democratic	Lisa Eliason	21,480	44.6
Libertarian	Scott Nazzarine	1,229	2.6

== Historical district boundaries ==
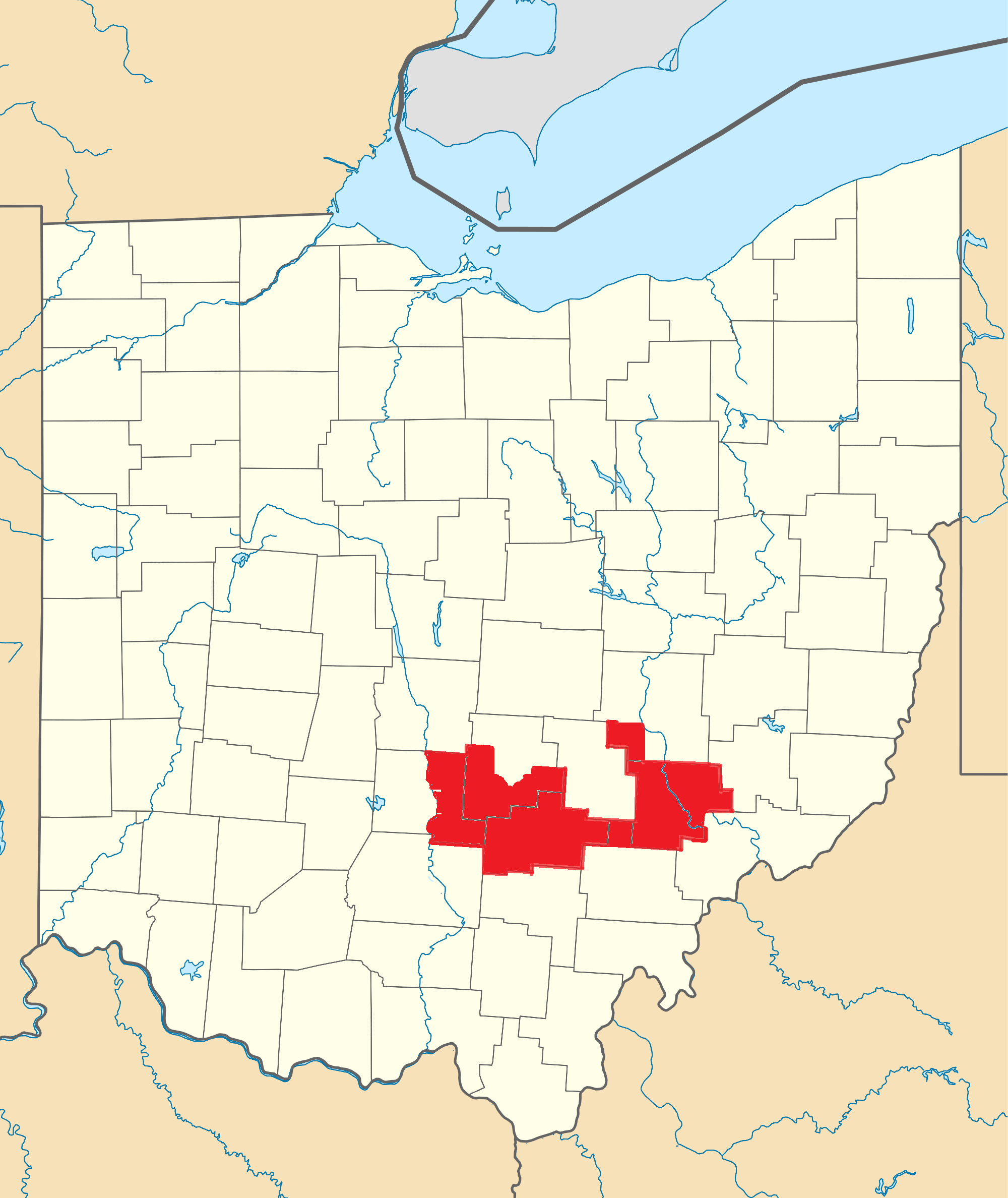
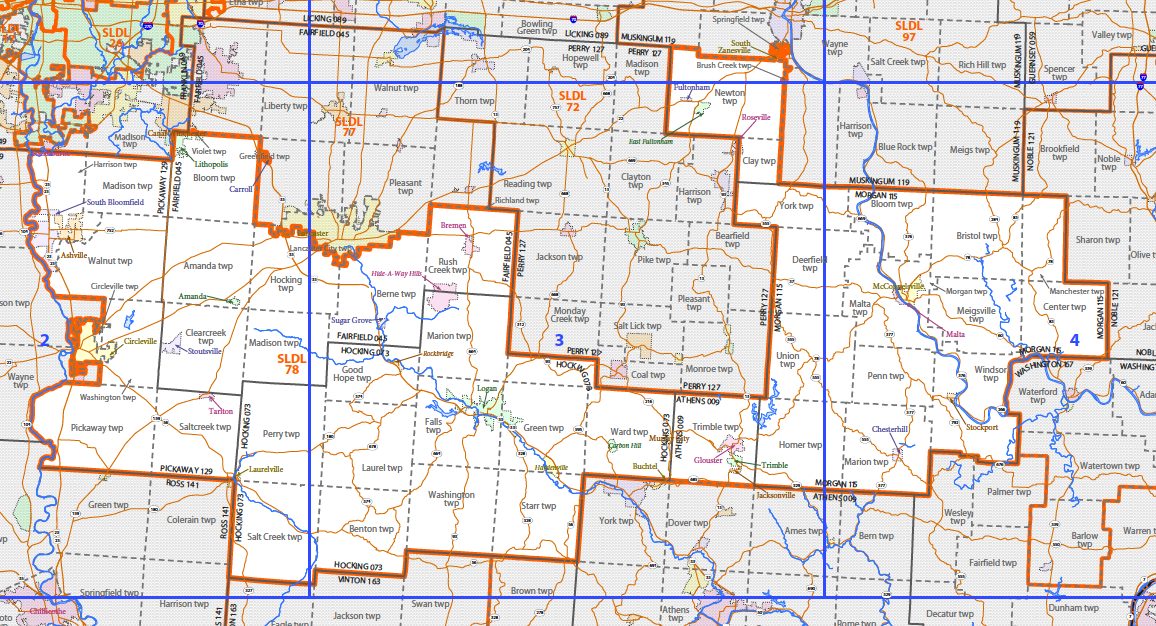
2013–2022
