= Richard Ditto =

American politician

Member of the Ohio Senate from the 12th district
- In office July 17, 1979 - December 31, 1980
- Preceded by: Walter White
- Succeeded by: Steve Maurer

Personal details
- Born: 1934 or 1935 (age 91–92)
- Party: Republican

Richard Ditto is a former member of the Ohio Senate, serving from 1979 to 1980. He represented the 12th District which encompassed much of West-Central Ohio. Known for his pro-choice stance on abortion and is the reason he lost in a solid Republican district to a Democrat during the Reagan 1980 landslide election. He also worked as a representative for Congressman Mike Oxley for many years.
