= NW Raiders =

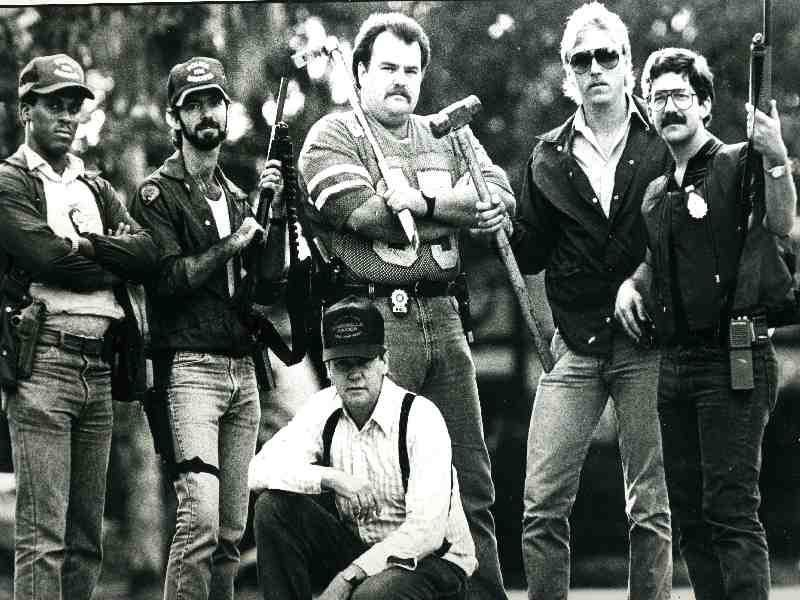
NW Raiders from the Fort Lauderdale Police Department

The NW Raiders is a police crime unit with the Fort Lauderdale Police Department in Fort Lauderdale, Florida.

Focused primarily on crack cocaine, the NW Raiders were the first police unit in the United States to employ "reverse stings" and ram vehicles in undercover drug enforcement activities.

== History ==
The initial Raider Unit was a temporary unit formed by Sgt George Hurt of the Fort Lauderdale Police Dept in 1983. The Unit, known as Hurts Raiders, was staffed by road patrol officers who focused on the street sales of heroin and cocaine. As they stormed into the homes and neighborhoods with their vans and cars, it became easy for the drug users and drug dealers to identify this group as the "Raiders".

They concentrated their investigations in District 2, which is located in the NW (Northwest) section of Fort Lauderdale, Broward County, Florida. The unit was then disbanded after a 2-month period and street level investigations were left to patrol.

From 1983 to 1985, FLPD (Fort Lauderdale Police Department) patrol officers initiated all the street level investigations as part of their assignments, which included search warrants. There were four officers handling all street level drug activity during this period. Officer Keith Abrahamsen, Ron Hood, Marion Sims and Rick Kosick. At the end of 1984, Abrahamsen and Hood were reassigned to other areas of the department, which left the bulk of the investigations to Officers Sims and Kosick.

With an epidemic Crack Cocaine problem hitting the streets, the two patrol officers could not handle all the investigations. Their drug investigations were in addition to their normal patrol activities on midnight shift. With public outcry connected with street sales and the violence that goes along with it, Fort Lauderdale then Police Chief Ron Cochran formed the NW Raiders which he selected patrol officers who worked the NW Area of Fort Lauderdale.

Formed in 1985, the Unit "NW RAIDERS" consisted of Five Detectives and One Sgt. Detective Abrahamsen joined the Unit in 1986 when Detective Memrick was reassigned.

During the first two years of the unit forming, 1,100 arrests were made, 172 search warrants were executed and 116 vehicles were seized. Investigations included the use of wiretaps, reverse stings, controlled buys and stake outs.

== Reverse sting and ram vehicles ==
The NW Raiders conducted the first documented "Reverse Sting" in the United States. In a "reverse sting", a police officer poses as a "Street Seller". Many police agencies trained with the NW Raiders on using this method.

The NW Raiders were the first police unit in the country to use ram vehicles during reverse stings. These were vehicles that were specially equipped to ram the vehicles of any suspects trying to flee the crime scene.

NW Raiders was also the first police unit in Florida to seize and forfeit the vehicles and jewelry of drug buyers/sellers under the Florida Contraband Forfeiture Act

Both media and the community identified the unit as "The Raiders or Northwest Raiders".

In November 1987, the Miami Herald was given permission to embed two reporters with the unit for 1 month. The reporters were allowed to ride along with the unit daily. Photographer Charles Trainor and Trish Power was given the assignment, and on Dec 27, 1987, the Miami Herald did a full page article on the NW Raiders calling the article "DRUG WARRIORS - UNIT SERVES ON THE FRONT LINES".

The long term reward is that Multiple Units/Operations/Actions plans were derived from the NW Raiders Narcotics Unit efforts and success. There tactics continue to exist today.

== Publicity ==
The NW Raiders were featured on ABC News, NBC, CBS and CNN. Media publications included Newsweek, Time Magazine, Miami Herald, Sun Sentinel and various Law journals .

The NW Raiders is no longer an active unit in the Fort Lauderdale Police Department.

== Sources ==
- 2011 Article from Sun-Sentinel
- Northwest Raiders – the name, and accusations, never die November 5, 2011|By Brittany Wallman, Sun Sentinel
- 2012 Article from Sun-Sentinel http://www.sun-sentinel.com/news/local/crime/fl-fort-lauderdale-cops-arrested-20120531,0,4807123.story Sun Sentinel
- Fort Lauderdale officers surrender, face charges of covering up misconduct By Paula McMahon and Robert Nolin, Sun Sentinel
