= Senator Maurer =

Senator Maurer may refer to:

- John J. Maurer (1922–2019), Wisconsin State Senate
- Steve Maurer (born 1947), Ohio State Senate
