= Ohio's 12th senatorial district =

American legislative district

Ohio's 12th State Senate district
Senator
| Susan Manchester; R–Waynesfield |
- Demographics: 88% White; 6.2% Black; 2.3% Hispanic; 1% Asian; 1.8% Native American; 0.3% Hawaiian/Pacific Islander
- Population (2020) • Voting age • Citizens of voting age: 344,252; 262,250; 257,573

Ohio's 12th senatorial district Is in the rural western counties of Ohio, Mercer, Dark, Allen, Auglaize, Champaign and the southern part of Logan County. It contains House Districts 78, 84, and 85.

The current Ohio Senator is Republican Susan Manchester.

== Historically ==
Before the 2023 redistricting, Ohio's 12th senatorial district was based in rural western Ohio. It comprises the counties of Allen, Mercer, Shelby, Champaign as well as portions of Auglaize, Darke and Logan counties. It encompasses Ohio House districts 4, 84 and 85. It has a Cook PVI of R+29.

== List of senators ==
| Senator | Party | Term | Notes |
|---|---|---|---|
| Tennyson Guyer | Republican | January 3, 1967 – December 31, 1972 | Guyer was elected to the United States Congress in 1972. |
| Walter White | Republican | January 3, 1973 – June 26, 1979 | White resigned prior to the expiration of his term in 1980. |
| Richard Ditto | Republican | July 17, 1979 – December 31, 1980 | Ditto lost re-election in 1980 to Steve Maurer. |
| Steve Maurer | Democrat | January 3, 1981 – December 31, 1984 | Maurer lost re-election in 1984 to Robert Cupp. |
| Robert R. Cupp | Republican | January 3, 1985 – December 31, 2000 | Cupp was term-limited in 2000. |
| Jim Jordan | Republican | January 3, 2001 – December 31, 2006 | Jordan was elected to the United States Congress in 2006. |
| Keith Faber | Republican | January 2, 2007 – December 31, 2016 | Faber served as Senate President and was term-limited in 2016. |
| Matt Huffman | Republican | January 3, 2017 – January 6, 2025 | Huffman was elected to the Ohio House of Representatives and is the current Speaker of the Ohio House of Representatives |
| Susan Manchester | Republican | January 7, 2025 – present | Incumbent |
