= Walter L. White =

American politician

Walter White
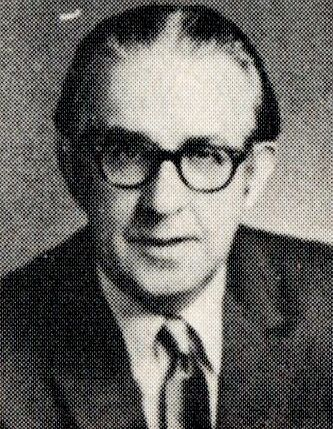

Member of the Ohio Senate from the 12th district
- In office January 3, 1973 – June 26, 1979
- Preceded by: Tennyson Guyer
- Succeeded by: Richard Ditto

Member of the Ohio House of Representatives from the 6th district
- In office January 3, 1958 – December 31, 1972
- Preceded by: Districts Created
- Succeeded by: Waldo Rose

Personal details
- Born: Walter Lemuel White; July 6, 1919 Lima, Ohio, United States
- Died: November 10, 2007 (aged 88) Lima, Ohio, United States
- Party: Republican

Walter Lemuel White (July 6, 1919 – November 10, 2007) was a former member of the Ohio Senate. He served from 1973 until 1979. His district was the 12th, which encompassed much of West-Central Ohio. Prior to his service in the Senate, White served three terms in the Ohio House, representing the 6th District, which at the time was composed of Allen County.
