= Judith Carr (politician) =

American politician

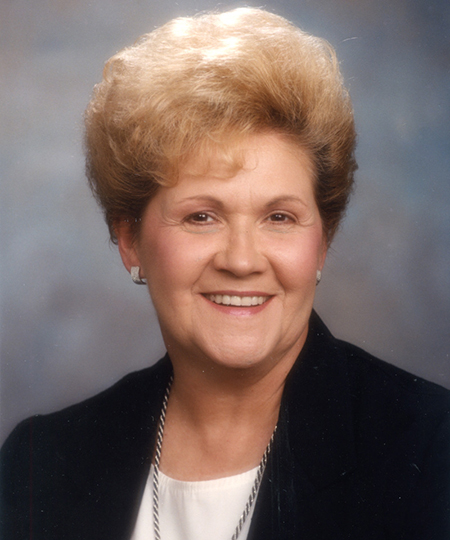

Member of the Ohio House of Representatives from the 57th district
- In office May 3, 1993 – December 31, 1994
- Preceded by: Francis Carr
- Succeeded by: Ron Hood

Personal details
- Born: September 13, 1938 (age 87) New Philadelphia, Ohio, U.S.
- Party: Democratic

Judith Carr (born September 13, 1938) is a former member of the Ohio House of Representatives. Carr was appointed to the Ohio House to complete the term of her late husband, Francis Carr. She represented Stark, Carroll, and Mahoning Counties.
