= 2021 Ohio's 15th congressional district special election =

Ohio's 15th congressional district special election
- November 2, 2021

Ohio's 15th congressional district
- Turnout: 32.25%
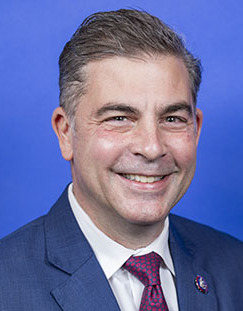

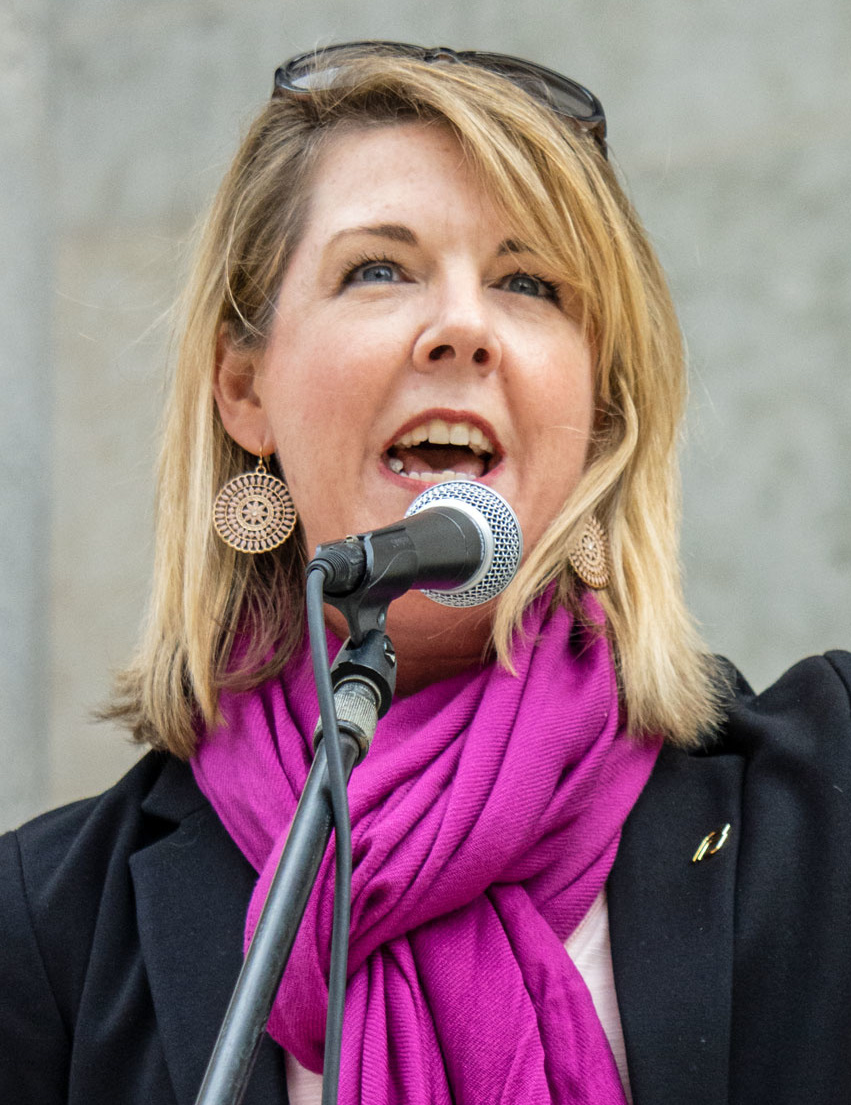
Nominee	Mike Carey	Allison Russo
Party	Republican	Democratic
Popular vote	94,501	67,588
Percentage	58.3%	41.7%
- Carey: 50–60% 60–70% 70–80% 80–90% >90% Russo: 50–60% 60–70% 70–80% 80–90% >90% Tie: 50% No data
U.S. Representative before election
Steve Stivers
Republican
Elected U.S. Representative
Mike Carey
Republican

On May 16, 2021, Representative Steve Stivers resigned from his seat in the United States House of Representatives to become president and CEO of the Ohio Chamber of Commerce. Following Stivers' official communication of his intent to resign, Ohio Governor Mike DeWine announced that the special election to fill the remainder of his term would be held on November 2, 2021, with the primary election held on August 3, concurrent with the special election in Ohio's 11th congressional district. In the general election on November 2, Republican nominee Mike Carey defeated Democratic nominee Allison Russo by 26,913 votes.

== Republican primary ==
=== Candidates ===
==== Nominee ====
- Mike Carey, vice president of government affairs at American Consolidated Natural Resources

==== Eliminated in primary ====
- John Adams, owner of Green Valley Chemicals
- Eric M. Clark, LPN at Wright-Patterson Air Force Base
- Thad Cooperrider, former Perry County commissioner
- Ruth Edmonds, advisory board member at Ohio's Office of Faith-Based and Community Initiatives
- Ron Hood, former state representative
- Thomas Hwang, owner of the Virtues Golf Club
- Stephanie Kunze, state senator
- Jeff LaRe, state representative
- Bob Peterson, state senator
- Omar Tarazi, attorney and Hilliard city councilmember

==== Withdrawn ====
- Brian Stewart, state representative

==== Declined ====
- Jeff Fix, Fairfield County commissioner

=== Endorsements ===
Mike Carey

Executive branch officials

- Donald Trump, 45th president of the United States (2017–2021)

U.S. representatives

- Elise Stefanik, chair of the House Republican Conference (2021–present) and U.S. representative from NY-21 (2015–present)

Individuals

- Corey Lewandowski, senior advisor to former President Donald Trump
Stephanie Kunze

Organizations

- Franklin County, Ohio Republican Party
- Maggie's List
Jeff LaRe

U.S. representatives

- Steve Stivers, former U.S. representative from OH-15 (2011–2021)

State representatives

- Cindy Abrams (R-Harrison), Assistant Majority Whip
- Adam Bird (R-New Richmond)
- Sara Carruthers (R- Hamilton)
- Jon Cross (R-Kenton)
- Haraz Ghanbari (R-Perrysburg)
- Thomas Hall (R-Madison Twp.)
- Brett Hillyer (R-Uhrichsville)
- Mike Loychik (R-Bazetta)
- Gail Pavliga (R-Portage County)
- Phil Plummer (R-Dayton)
- Bill Seitz (R-Cincinnati), Majority Floor Leader
- Reggie Stoltzfus (R-Paris Twp.)
- D. J. Swearingen (R-Huron)
- Bob Young (R-Green)
- Tom Young (R-Washington Twp.)

Organizations

- Left or Right Politics
Bob Peterson

U.S. representatives

- Steve Austria, former U.S. representative from OH-07 (2009–2013)
- Dave Hobson, former U.S. representative from OH-07 (1991–2009)

State legislators

- Bob Hackett, Ohio state senator
- Jay Hottinger, president pro tempore of the Ohio Senate (2021–present) from District 31 (1998–2006; 2015–present)
- Mark Johnson, Ohio state representative from District 92 (2021–present)
- Tim Schaffer, Ohio state senator from District 20 (2019–present)

County commissioners

- Harold "Champ" Henson, III, Pickaway County, Ohio
- Gary Scherer, Pickaway County, Ohio, commissioner and former Ohio state representative from District 92 (2012–2020)
Ron Hood

U.S. senators

- Rand Paul, U.S. senator from Kentucky (2011–present)
Ruth Edmonds

Individuals

- James Dobson, evangelical Christian author, psychologist, and founder of Focus on the Family

=== Polling ===
Poll source	Date(s) administered	Sample size (Note: Key: A – all adults RV – registered voters LV – likely voters V – unclear)	Margin of error	John Adams	Mike Carey	Eric Clark	Thad Cooperrider	Ruth Edmonds	Ron Hood	Thomas Hwang	Stephanie Kunze	Jeff LaRe	Bob Peterson	Omar Tarazi	Undecided
Fabrizio Lee & Associates (R) (Note: This poll was sponsored by Mike Carey's campaign.)	June 23–24, 2021	400 (LV)	± 4.9%	<1%	20%	0%	2%	<1%	7%	3%	6%	9%	7%	1%	44%

=== Results ===
Results by county Carey: 30–40%; 40–50%; 50–60%; Peterson: 50–60%

Republican primary results
Party	Candidate	Votes	%
Republican	Mike Carey	18,805	36.3
Republican	Jeff LaRe	6,776	13.1
Republican	Ron Hood	6,676	12.9
Republican	Bob Peterson	6,407	12.4
Republican	Ruth Edmonds	5,090	9.8
Republican	Thomas Hwang	2,499	4.8
Republican	Stephanie Kunze	2,363	4.6
Republican	Thad Cooperrider	1,076	2.1
Republican	Omar Tarazi	907	1.7
Republican	John Adams	173	0.3
Republican	Eric M. Clark	83	0.2
Total votes		51,855	100.0

== Democratic primary ==
=== Candidates ===
==== Nominee ====
- Allison Russo, state representative

==== Eliminated in primary ====
- Greg Betts

==== Declined ====
- Tina Maharath, state senator
- Joel Newby, attorney and nominee for Ohio's 15th congressional district in 2020
- Steve Patterson, mayor of Athens (endorsed Russo)
- Michael Stinziano, Franklin County auditor

=== Endorsements ===
Allison Russo

U.S. senators

- Sherrod Brown, U.S. senator from Ohio (2007–present)

Local officials

- Steve Patterson, mayor of Athens

Organizations

- 314 Action
- AFL–CIO
- United Auto Workers

=== Results ===
Results by county Russo: Russo—70–80%; Russo—80–90%

Democratic primary results
Party	Candidate	Votes	%
Democratic	Allison Russo	13,704	84.2
Democratic	Greg Betts	2,576	15.8
Total votes		16,280	100.0

== General election ==
=== Predictions ===
Source	Ranking	As of
The Cook Political Report	Likely R	August 4, 2021
Inside Elections	Solid R	October 27, 2021
Sabato's Crystal Ball	Likely R	August 4, 2021

=== Endorsements ===
Mike Carey (R)

Executive branch officials

- Mike Pence, 48th vice president of the United States (2017–2021)
- Donald Trump, 45th president of the United States (2017–2021)

U.S. representatives

- Elise Stefanik, chair of the House Republican Conference (2021–present) and U.S. representative from NY-21 (2015–present)

Individuals

- Corey Lewandowski, senior advisor to former President Donald Trump
Allison Russo (D)

Executive branch officials

- Joe Biden, 46th president of the United States (2021–present)

U.S. senators

- Sherrod Brown, U.S. senator from Ohio (2007–present)

Local officials

- Steve Patterson, mayor of Athens

Organizations

- 314 Action
- AFL–CIO
- EMILY's List
- League of Conservation Voters
- United Auto Workers

=== Polling ===
Poll source	Date(s) administered	Sample size	Margin of error	Mike Carey (R)	Allison Russo (D)	Undecided
Emerson College	October 14–16, 2021	445 (LV)	± 4.6%	50%	39%	11%

=== Results ===
2021 Ohio's 15th congressional district special election
Party	Candidate	Votes	%	±%
Republican	Mike Carey	94,501	58.30%	–5.11
Democratic	Allison Russo	67,588	41.70%	+5.13
Total votes		162,089	100.0%	
Turnout		(Note: Including invalid votes or ballots not counted for either candidate)165,026	32.25%	
Registered electors		511,773		
Republican hold				

By county

County	Mike Carey Republican		Allison Russo Democratic		Margin		Total votes
County	#	%	#	%	#	%	Total votes
Athens (part)	3,611	37.0	6,160	63.0	2,549	26.0	9,771
Clinton	5,972	78.5	1,632	21.5	4,340	57.0	7,604
Fairfield	21,011	65.4	11,117	34.6	9,894	30.8	32,128
Fayette (part)	918	84.5	168	15.5	750	69.0	1,086
Franklin (part)	29,842	45.2	36,230	54.8	6,388	9.6	66,072
Hocking	3,756	68.8	1,701	31.2	2,055	37.6	5,457
Madison	6,535	72.7	2,450	27.3	4,085	45.4	8,985
Morgan	2,533	74.4	873	25.6	1,660	48.8	3,406
Perry	5,487	72.5	2,054	27.2	3,433	45.3	7,541
Pickaway	8,321	73.8	2,956	26.2	5,365	47.6	11,277
Ross (part)	4,633	73.9	1,638	26.1	2,995	47.8	6,271
Vinton	1,882	75.6	609	24.4	1,273	51.2	2,491
Total	94,501	58.3	67,588	41.7	26,913	16.6	162,089

Counties that flipped from Republican to Democratic

- Franklin (largest municipality: Columbus)

== Notes ==
Partisan clients
