= Mike Carey (politician) =

American politician (born 1971)

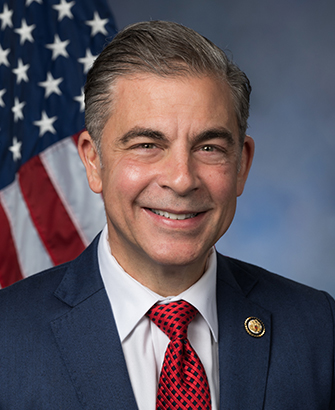
- Official portrait, 2026

Member of the U.S. House of Representatives from Ohio's 15th district
- Incumbent
- Assumed office November 2, 2021 (Note: Carey's official service begins on the date of the special election, while he was not sworn in until November 4, 2021.)
- Preceded by: Steve Stivers

Personal details
- Born: Michael Todd Whitaker Carey; March 13, 1971 (age 55) Sabina, Ohio, U.S.
- Party: Republican
- Spouse: Meghan Carey
- Children: 3
- Education: Marion Military Institute (AA); Ohio State University (BA)
- Website: House website Campaign website

Military service
- Branch/service: United States Army
- Years of service: 1989–1999
- Unit: Army National Guard

Michael Todd Whitaker Carey (born March 13, 1971) is an American politician and former coal lobbyist serving as the U.S. representative for Ohio's 15th congressional district. A member of the Republican Party, Carey was first elected in a 2021 special election.

== Early life and education ==
Carey was raised in Sabina, Ohio. After attending East Clinton High School, he earned an Associate of Arts degree in economics from the Marion Military Institute and a Bachelor of Arts in history from Ohio State University.

== Career ==
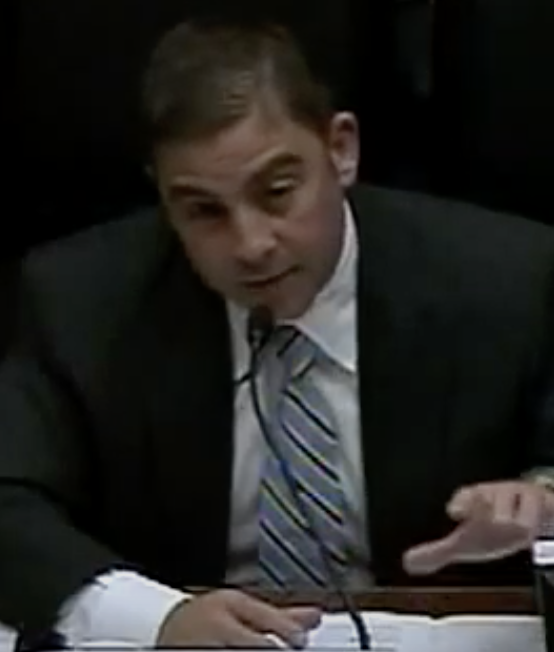
Carey testifying before the Committee on Oversight and Reform in 2011

Carey served in the Army National Guard from 1989 to 1999. As a college student, he worked as an aide to State Senator Merle G. Kearns. Carey, prior to his election, worked as vice president of government affairs for American Consolidated Natural Resources, a coal company. He was also chairman of the board of the Ohio Coal Association, prior to stepping down following his congressional run. During the 2004 and 2008 presidential elections, Carey developed negative campaign ads against Democratic nominees John Kerry and Barack Obama.

As a result of his past career in the coal industry, Carey considers himself a "an advocate for coal miners and American energy independence" and prioritizes development of energy policy in the House of Representatives.

== U.S. House of Representatives ==
=== Elections ===
==== 2021 special ====
Carey was the Republican nominee in the 2021 15th congressional district special election. He was endorsed by then former President Donald Trump and former Vice President Mike Pence.

Carey received the most financial contributions out of all 11 candidates in the Republican primary, including from out-of-state donors and individuals in the coal and mining industries. Political commentators and journalists called the race "a test of Trump's influence over Republican politics." Carey won the special election on November 2.

==== 2022 ====
In the 2022 election, Carey defeated the Democratic nominee, union leader Gary Josephson. Carey raised around $2.3 million for this election, the 251st-highest sum among elected representatives.

=== 118th Congress ===
Before the 118th Congress, Carey declared his support for Kevin McCarthy's bid for House Speaker amid controversy about McCarthy's leadership following the 2022 midterm elections. Carey also announced his intention to "get on the Ways and Means Committee" in the 118th Congress. In mid-2023, Carey announced the re-launch of the "House Civility and Respect Caucus" with Representative Joyce Beatty, originally formed by Representative Steve Stivers and Beatty. The House Civility and Respect Caucus's expressed purpose is to "promote the use of respectful dialogue on challenging issues."

Following the ousting of Speaker of the House Kevin McCarthy in October 2023, Carey worked to gather votes for the election of Ohio Representative Jim Jordan's bid for Speaker of the House. Following Jordan's withdrawal from the speakership bid, Carey voted for Speaker of the House Mike Johnson.

Carey voted to provide Israel with military support following 2023 Hamas attack on Israel.

=== 119th Congress ===
Following the 2024 election of Donald Trump, Carey was considered a "top contender" to fill the U.S. Senate seat vacated by elected-Vice President J.D. Vance. In November 2024, the Ohio Association of Professional Fire Fighters publicly endorsed Mike Carey as a candidate to fill the seat. Governor Mike DeWine appointed former-Ohio Lieutenant Governor Jon Husted to fill the vacated seat.

=== Domestic relations ===
Carey has a deep and friendly relationship with the American Albanian community. He has frequently engaged with leaders and officials such as with the Albanian Ambassador Ervin Bushati.

=== Committee assignments ===
- Committee on Ways and Means
- Committee on House Administration

=== Caucus memberships ===
- Black Maternal Health Caucus
- Congressional Humanities Caucus

== Personal life ==
Carey and his wife, Meghan, have two sons and reside in Columbus. Carey has a son from a previous relationship; he also has a grandson. He is a Roman Catholic.

== Electoral history ==
=== 2021 special election ===
Republican primary results
Party	Candidate	Votes	%
Republican	Mike Carey	18,805	36.3
Republican	Jeff LaRe	6,776	13.1
Republican	Ron Hood	6,676	12.9
Republican	Bob Peterson	6,407	12.4
Republican	Ruth Edmonds	5,090	9.8
Republican	Thomas Hwang	2,499	4.8
Republican	Stephanie Kunze	2,363	4.6
Republican	Thad Cooperrider	1,076	2.1
Republican	Omar Tarazi	907	1.7
Republican	John Adams	173	0.3
Republican	Eric M. Clark	83	0.2
Total votes		51,855	100.0

2021 Ohio's 15th congressional district special election
Party	Candidate	Votes	%
Republican	Mike Carey	94,501	58.3
Democratic	Allison Russo	67,588	41.7
Total votes		162,089	100.0

=== 2022 midterm election ===
2022 Ohio's 15th congressional district general election
Party	Candidate	Votes	%
Republican	Mike Carey	143,112	57.0
Democratic	Gary Josephson	108,139	43.0
Total votes		251,251	100.0

=== 2024 general election ===
2024 Ohio's 15th congressional district election
Party	Candidate	Votes	%
Republican	Mike Carey (incumbent)	196,338	56.46
Democratic	Adam Miller	151,411	43.54
Total votes		347,749	100
Republican hold			

U.S. House of Representatives
Preceded by Steve Stivers	Member of the U.S. House of Representatives from Ohio's 15th congressional district 2021–present	Incumbent
U.S. order of precedence (ceremonial)
Preceded by Shontel Brown	United States representatives by seniority 285th	Succeeded by Mike Flood
