= Francis Carr (Ohio politician) =

American politician (1927–1993)

Member of the Ohio House of Representatives from the 57th district
- In office January 3, 1993 – 23 April 1993
- Preceded by: Joseph Vukovich
- Succeeded by: Judith Carr

Personal details
- Born: February 12, 1927 Alliance, Ohio, U.S.
- Died: April 23, 1993 (aged 66) Alliance, Ohio, U.S.
- Party: Democratic

Francis Carr (12 February 1927 – 23 April 1993) was a member of the Ohio House of Representatives. Carr died of kidney failure while still in office and his widow, Judith Carr, was appointed to complete his term.
