= John E. Barnes Jr. =

American politician (born 1958)

John Barnes

Member of the Ohio House of Representatives from the 12th district
- In office January 3, 2011 – December 31, 2018
- Preceded by: Michael DeBose
- Succeeded by: Juanita Brent
- In office January 3, 1999 – February 13, 2002
- Preceded by: Vermel Whalen
- Succeeded by: Michael DeBose

Personal details
- Born: June 12, 1958 (age 68) Cleveland, Ohio, U.S.
- Party: Democratic
- Education: Case Western Reserve University (MS)
- Website: https://www.votebarnes.com/

John E. Barnes Jr. (born June 12, 1958) is an American politician who served as a member of the Ohio House of Representatives, representing the 12th district from 2011 to 2018. He formerly served in the same seat from January 1999 to February 2002.

== Education ==
Barnes was born in Cleveland, Ohio and raised in the Union–Miles Park neighborhood. He earned a Master of Science degree in business management from Weatherhead School of Management at Case Western Reserve University.

== Career ==
Barnes served as director of Cleveland's Department of Community Relations and was a senior tax auditor and investigator in the city's division of taxation before serving two terms in the Ohio House of Representatives from 1999 to 2002. Barnes opted out of serving a third term and was replaced by Michael DeBose. However, upon DeBose being term limited in 2010, Barnes opted to try and take back his old seat.

In the heavily-Democratic seat, Barnes faced four opponents in the Democratic primary, included DeBose's son, Michael K. DeBose. While The Plain Dealer did not endorse Barnes, he went on to win the primary. Barnes ran unopposed in the general election, was sworn into his former seat on January 3, 2011. Subsequently, Barnes was named as a member of the Economic and Small Business Development Committee, the Health and Aging Committee, and the Ways and Means Committee. He was also a member of the Vehicle Management Commission.

Barnes was unopposed for reelection to his seat in 2012. In 2014, Barnes did not receive the endorsement of the Democratic party. He won a contested primary election against Jill Miller Zimon, a city councilwoman in Pepper Pike, with 54% of the vote. He ran unopposed in the general election.

On February 1, 2021, Barnes filed a statement of candidacy with the Federal Election Commission for the 2021 Ohio's 11th congressional district special election.

Ohio House of Representatives
Preceded by Vermel Whalen	Member of the Ohio House from the 12th district 1999–2002	Succeeded by Michael DeBose
Preceded by Michael DeBose	Member of the Ohio House from the 12th district 2011–2018	Succeeded by Juanita Brent
