= Susan Manchester =

American politician

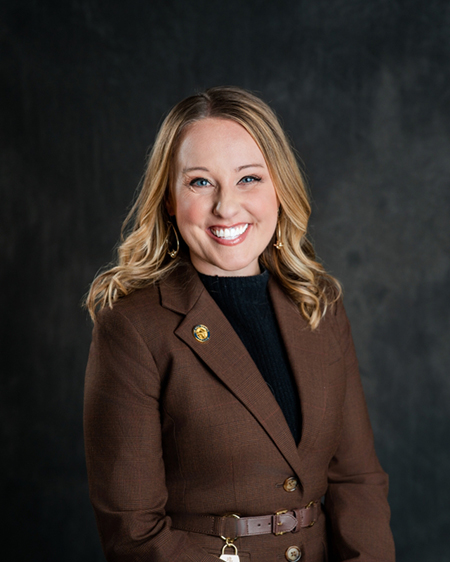
- Official portrait, 2025

Member of the Ohio Senate from the 12th district
- Incumbent
- Assumed office January 7, 2025
- Preceded by: Matt Huffman

Member of the Ohio House of Representatives
- In office January 3, 2023 – January 6, 2025
- Preceded by: Brian Stewart
- Succeeded by: Matt Huffman
- Constituency: 78th district
- In office January 7, 2019 – December 31, 2022
- Preceded by: Keith Faber
- Succeeded by: Angela King
- Constituency: 84th district

Personal details
- Born: Lima, Ohio
- Party: Republican
- Education: Ohio State University

Susan Annette Manchester is an American politician who has served as a member of the Ohio Senate, representing the 12th district since 2025. She previously served in the Ohio House of Representatives from 2019 to 2025. She represented the 78th District, which encompasses Allen County and the northern portion of Auglaize County.

Growing up on the family farm in Waynesfield, Ohio, Manchester went on to graduate from The Ohio State University in 2010 with degrees in Psychology and Political Science. She worked in Washington, D.C. for Congressman Jim Jordan, where she focused on policies such as agriculture, health care, business and education. Upon returning to Ohio in 2016, Manchester worked as a field representative for the Trump campaign. She later took a position with a Big Brother Big Sisters.

Manchester was first elected to the General Assembly in 2018. During her time in the legislature, Representative Manchester chaired the House Families, Aging, and Human Services Committee, and also served as a member of the House Health Committee and House Primary and Secondary Education Committee. Additionally, she was appointed to the Health Oversight and Advisory Committee in 2021.

Representative Manchester also served as the Co-Vice Chair of the Ohio Legislative Children Caucus, where she ardently fought for the protection and safety of Ohio’s children. She created the Ohio Youth and Family Ombudsman Office through the department of Jobs and Family Services, which provides a layer of security and accountability for Ohio’s children. Her work as an advocate for Ohio’s children has been recognized statewide. Representative Manchester was honored by the Public Children Services Association of Ohio with the Legislator of the Year Award in 2022, and was recognized as a Champion of Children by the Ohio Children’s Alliance.

Additionally, Representative Manchester introduced and passed several important bills that addressed needs she saw in her district; many of these bills are now state law. Notable bills she had signed into law include the Beginning Farmer Tax Credit Program, which helps assist one generation of farmers to the next as agricultural assets are rented and sold and ultimately fosters a strong agricultural presence in the state. She also closed a dangerous loophole in Ohio law by expanding the Ohio Revised Code to criminalize the use or manipulation of a controlled substance addiction as a method of human trafficking.
