= Dan Dodd =

American politician

Member of the Ohio House of Representatives from the 91st district
- In office January 2, 2007 – December 31, 2010
- Preceded by: Ron Hood
- Succeeded by: Bill Hayes

Personal details
- Born: February 15, 1978 (age 48) New Lexington, Ohio, U.S.
- Party: Democratic
- Education: University of Cincinnati College of Law; Villanova University
- Profession: Attorney

Dan Dodd (born February 15, 1978) is a former Democratic member of the Ohio House of Representatives who represented the 91st District from 2007 to 2010. A lawyer by trade, Dodd practiced with Robert J. Dodd, Jr. Co. LPA in New Lexington, Ohio. While elected to office in 2006 and reelected in 2008, Dodd lost a third term in 2010.

He has since become the executive director of the Ohio Association of Independent Schools.
