= Tennyson Guyer =

American politician

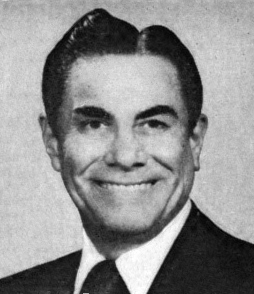
- Official Portrait, 1973

Member of the U.S. House of Representatives from Ohio's 4th district
- In office January 3, 1973 – April 12, 1981
- Preceded by: William M. McCulloch
- Succeeded by: Mike Oxley

Member of the Ohio Senate from the 2nd district
- In office January 3, 1967 – December 31, 1972
- Preceded by: Constituency established
- Succeeded by: Walter White

Personal details
- Born: November 29, 1912 Findlay, Ohio, U.S.
- Died: April 12, 1981 (aged 68) Alexandria, Virginia, U.S.
- Party: Republican
- Education: Findlay College
- Occupation: Congressman, public affairs director, minister, mayor

Tennyson Guyer (November 29, 1912 – April 12, 1981) was a member of the United States House of Representatives. He was a Republican from Ohio for four terms from 1973 to 1981.

== Early life and career ==
Born in Findlay, Ohio on November 29, either in 1912 or 1913, Guyer was educated in the public schools of Findlay, and performed as an aerialist at a young age with the Hagenbeck-Wallace Circus. He lived with his uncle after his father was killed by a heart attack on July 22, 1926.

He received a B.S. from Findlay College in 1934, and afterwards became an ordained minister. Guyer served as mayor of Celina, Ohio, from 1940 to 1944, and later became a member of the state central committee from 1954 to 1966.

Guyer was the public affairs director for Cooper Tire & Rubber Co. in Findlay from 1950 to 1972, and was a member of the Ohio State Senate from 1959 to 1972. He was also a delegate to the Ohio State Republican conventions each year from 1950 to 1957, and was a delegate to the Republican National Convention in 1956.

== Congress ==
He was elected as a Republican to the Ninety-third and to the four succeeding Congresses, serving Ohio's District 4 in the United States House of Representatives, and served from January 3, 1973, until his death from a heart attack on April 12, 1981, in Alexandria, Virginia. While serving as Congressman in 1979, he led the Cocaine Task Force as chairman, committed to curbing the drug's use in the US.

As a congressman, he was well known for traveling cross country and internationally to deliver speeches.

== Death ==
While inside his house in Alexandria, Virginia, he died in his sleep on April 12, 1981 while serving his fifth term in office. A heart problem was suspected as the cause, but was not confirmed immediately following the death. Later sources state his cause of death as a heart attack. He was interred in Maple Grove Cemetery in his hometown of Findlay, Ohio.

== See also ==
- List of members of the United States Congress who died in office (1950–1999)
- List of members of the House Un-American Activities Committee

== Sources ==
U.S. House of Representatives
Preceded by William Moore McCulloch	Member of the U.S. House of Representatives from Ohio's 4th congressional district 1973–1981	Succeeded by Mike Oxley
