= Steve Maurer =

American politician

Steven Maurer

Member of the Ohio Senate from the 12th district
- In office January 3, 1981 - December 31, 1984
- Preceded by: Richard Ditto
- Succeeded by: Robert R. Cupp

Personal details
- Born: July 20, 1947 (age 79) Shelby County, Ohio
- Died: December 16, 2022
- Party: Democratic

Steven Maurer (born July 20, 1947) was a veteran of foreign war, former mayor of Botkins, Ohio, and former member of the Ohio Senate, from 1981 to 1984. He represented the 12th District, which encompassed much of West-Central Ohio. During the eight years of President Barack Obama's administration, he served as the State of Ohio Executive Director of the United States Department of Agriculture Farm Service Agency.
