= Mike Oxley =

American politician and attorney (1944–2016)

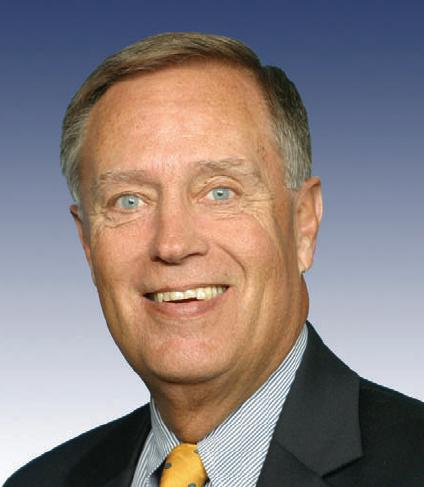
- Oxley c. 2001

Chair of the House Financial Services Committee
- In office January 3, 2001 – January 3, 2007
- Speaker: Dennis Hastert
- Preceded by: Jim Leach
- Succeeded by: Barney Frank

Member of the U.S. House of Representatives from Ohio's 4th district
- In office June 25, 1981 – January 3, 2007
- Preceded by: Tennyson Guyer
- Succeeded by: Jim Jordan

Member of the Ohio House of Representatives from the 82nd district
- In office January 3, 1973 – June 25, 1981
- Preceded by: Robert D. Schuck
- Succeeded by: Charlie Earl

Personal details
- Born: Michael Garver Oxley; February 11, 1944 Findlay, Ohio, U.S.
- Died: January 1, 2016 (aged 71) McLean, Virginia, U.S.
- Party: Republican
- Spouse: Patricia Ann Oxley
- Education: Miami University (BA); Ohio State University (JD)
- Occupation: FBI agent, lawyer
- Oxley's voice Oxley, as chair of the House Financial Services Committee, opens debate on the House version of the Sarbanes–Oxley Act; Recorded April 24, 2002

Michael Garver Oxley (February 11, 1944 – January 1, 2016) was an American Republican politician and attorney who served as a U.S. representative from the 4th congressional district of Ohio.

== Early life and career ==
Oxley was born in Findlay, Ohio, and received a Bachelor of Arts degree from Miami University in 1966 and a Juris Doctor degree from Ohio State University in 1969. He was a member of the Alpha chapter of the Sigma Chi fraternity at Miami.

From 1969 to 1972, Oxley worked for the Federal Bureau of Investigation and became active in the Ohio Republican Party. He served in the Ohio House of Representatives from 1973 to 1981.

== Congress ==
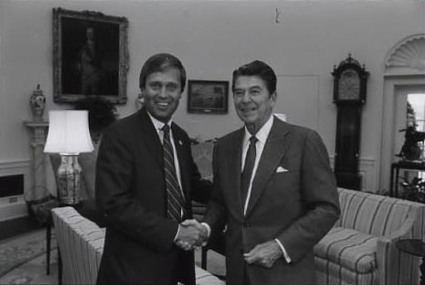
Oxley with President Ronald Reagan in 1981

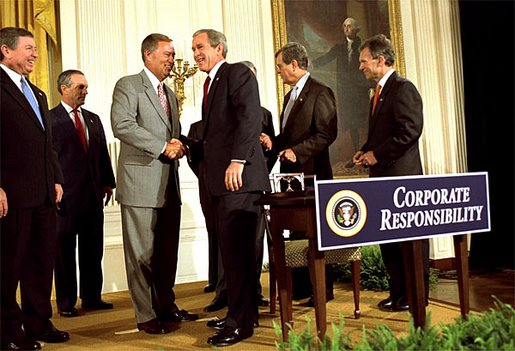
Oxley with President George W. Bush in 2002

Oxley was elected a U.S. Representative in 1981 in a special election to fill the vacancy caused by the death of U.S. Representative Tennyson Guyer. Oxley began serving at this post in June 1981 in the 97th Congress.

He served as the chairman of the Committee on Financial Services, and was House sponsor of the Sarbanes–Oxley Act of 2002, which enacted "sweeping post-Enron regulations of publicly traded companies." He was also the House sponsor of a 2006 bill that condemned media outlets that had published information on a covert financial surveillance system.

Oxley announced his retirement from Congress on November 1, 2005, effective at the end of his term in 2007. He was succeeded by Republican Jim Jordan.

== Post-congressional career ==
Following his retirement from Congress, Oxley was named a nonexecutive vice chairman for NASDAQ, and a partner at the law firm of BakerHostetler in Washington, D.C. In 2011, he became a registered lobbyist for FINRA.

Oxley, a non-smoker, was diagnosed with lung cancer around 2006, and became a member of the Lung Cancer Alliance board. He died in McLean, Virginia, on January 1, 2016, from the disease.

== Honors ==
The Findlay post office is named for Oxley and the portion of U.S. Route 30 within Hancock County is designated "Congressman Michael G. Oxley Memorial Highway".

U.S. House of Representatives
Preceded by Tennyson Guyer	Member of the U.S. House of Representatives from Ohio's 4th congressional district June 25, 1981 – January 3, 2007	Succeeded by Jim Jordan
Political offices
Preceded by Jim Leach; Iowa	Chairman of the House Financial Services Committee; 2001–2007	Succeeded by Barney Frank; Massachusetts
