= Juanita Brent =

American politician (born 1984)

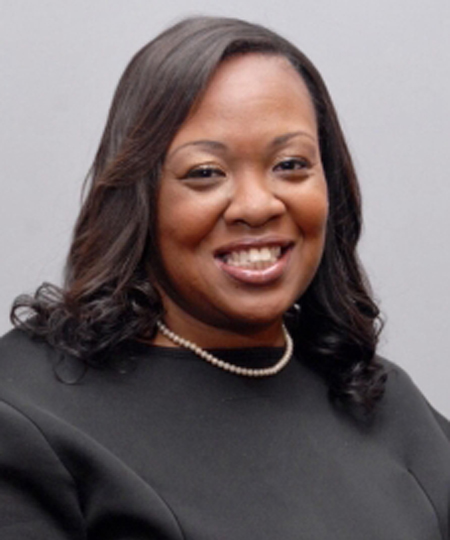

Member of the Ohio House of Representatives from the 18th district
- Incumbent
- Assumed office January 1, 2025
- Preceded by: Darnell Brewer

Member of the Ohio House of Representatives from the 22nd district
- In office January 3, 2023 – December 31, 2024
- Preceded by: David J. Leland
- Succeeded by: Darnell Brewer

Member of the Ohio House of Representatives from the 12th district
- In office January 7, 2019 – December 31, 2022
- Preceded by: John E. Barnes Jr.
- Succeeded by: Brian Stewart

Personal details
- Born: February 22, 1984 (age 42)
- Party: Democratic
- Relatives: Vermel Whalen (aunt)

Juanita Olukemi Brent (born February 22, 1984) is an American politician serving as a member of the Ohio House of Representatives since 2019. Her district includes the Cuyahoga County communities of Bedford, Bedford Heights, Cleveland Heights, Highland Hills, Maple Heights, Mayfield Heights, North Randall, Orange, Pepper Pike, Warrensville Heights, and parts of Cleveland.

== Early life and education ==
Brent and her siblings were raised by her aunt Vermel Whalen, an Ohio State Representative, after their mother died. She graduated from Beaumont School, an all-girls Roman Catholic high school in 2002.

== Ohio House of Representatives ==
=== Election ===
Brent was elected unopposed in the general election on November 6, 2018.

=== Committee assignments ===
Brent serves on the following committees:

- Commerce and Labor Committee
- Transportation and Public Safety Committee
- Agriculture and Rural Development Committee (Ranking Member)

== 2025 ==
Term-limited and unable to run for re-election in 2025, Brent entered the race for the Ward 1 seat on the Cleveland City Council. She challenged incumbent Joe Jones.

== Electoral history ==
Ohio House 18th District
Year	Democrat	Votes	Pct	Republican	Votes	Pct
2018	Juanita Brent	35,215	100%	Unopposed		
2020	Juanita Brent	43,247	82.2%	Jerry Powell	9,342	17.8%
2022	Juanita Brent	37,209	100%	Unopposed		
2024	Juanita Brent	50,276	89.2%	Justyn Anderson	5,991	10.6%
