= Vermel Whalen =

American politician

Member of the Ohio House of Representatives from the 12th district
- In office 1986–1998
- Preceded by: John D. Thompson, Jr.
- Succeeded by: John E. Barnes, Jr.

Personal details
- Born: Vermel Marie Scott; June 28, 1928 Portageville, Missouri
- Died: March 13, 2013 (aged 84) Cleveland, Ohio
- Party: Democratic

Vermel Marie Whalen (née Scott; June 28, 1928 – March 13, 2013) was a member of the Ohio House of Representatives, serving a Cleveland area district from 1986 to 1998.

Whelan was born in Portageville, Missouri and went to the local high school there. She moved to Cleveland, Ohio. Whelan went to Dyke College, University of Georgia, and Cleveland State University where she received her certificates. Whelan served as a nurse in Cleveland. She was the administrator of the Comprehensive Employment and Training Act for the city of Cleveland. Whelan also served as assistant administrator for the city recreation department. She died in 2013 of cancer in Cleveland, Ohio.
