= Ron Hood =

American politician (1969–2025)

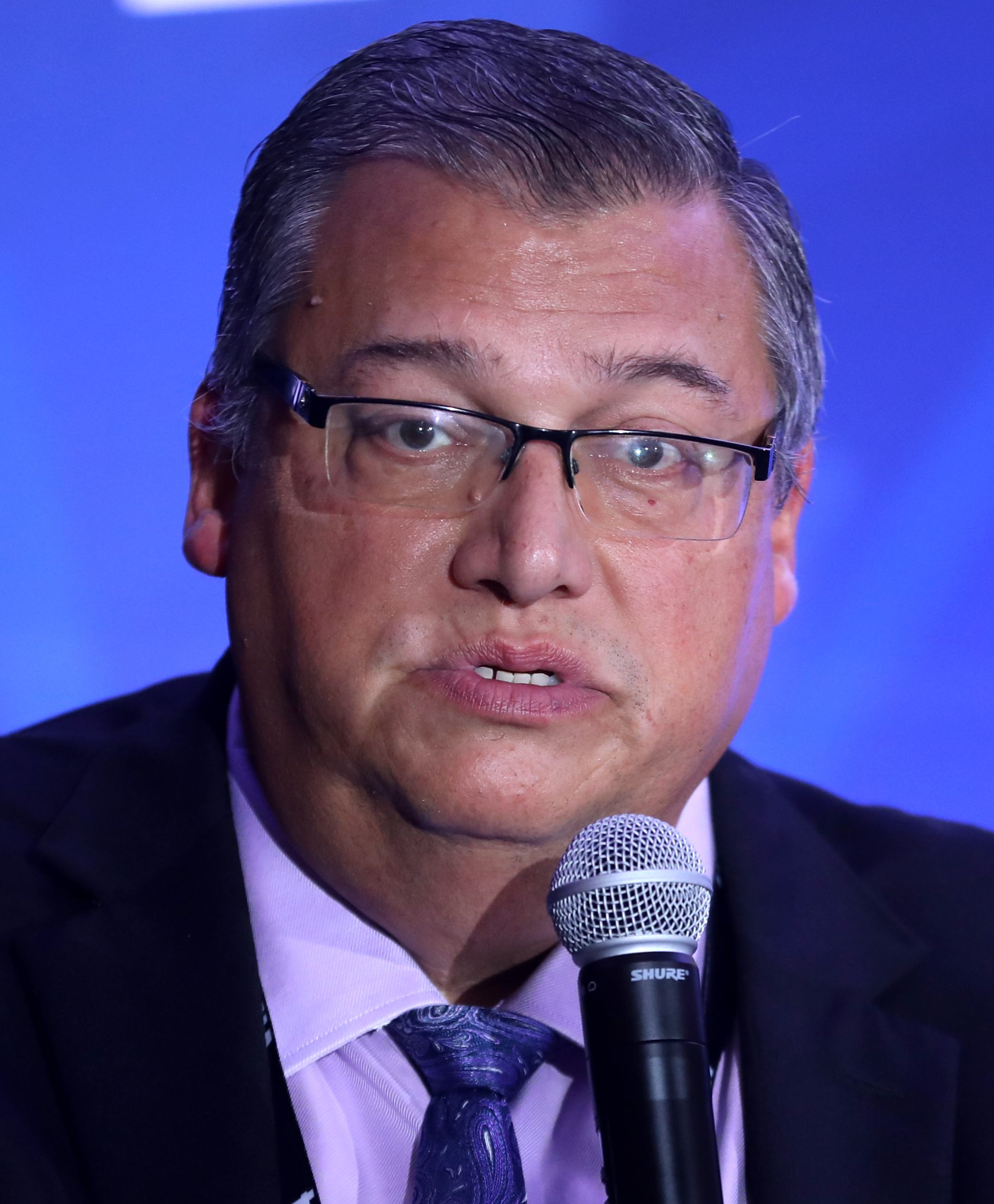

Member of the Ohio House of Representatives from the 78th district
- In office January 7, 2013 – December 31, 2020
- Preceded by: John Adams
- Succeeded by: Brian Stewart

Member of the Ohio House of Representatives from the 91st district
- In office January 3, 2005 – December 31, 2006
- Preceded by: Larry Householder
- Succeeded by: Dan Dodd

Member of the Ohio House of Representatives from the 57th district
- In office January 3, 1995 – December 31, 2000
- Preceded by: Judith Carr
- Succeeded by: John Boccieri

Personal details
- Born: Ronald Edward Hood; June 2, 1969 Warren, Ohio, U.S.
- Died: April 19, 2025 (aged 55) Circleville, Ohio, U.S.
- Party: Republican
- Spouse: Michal Dean (m. 2001; div. 2020)
- Children: 6
- Education: Ohio State University (BS)

Ronald Edward Hood (June 2, 1969 – April 19, 2025) was an American Republican legislator in the Ohio House of Representatives. He represented the 78th District. He also represented, at various times, both the 57th and the 91st districts. Hood was a candidate in the 2021 Ohio's 15th congressional district special election and was a candidate in the 2022 Ohio gubernatorial election.

== Education ==
A graduate of the Fisher College of Business at Ohio State University, Hood earned a Bachelor of Science degree in Business Administration in 1991. He had dual majors in marketing and economics.

== Political career ==
=== Early political career (1992–2006) ===
Hood began his political career in 1992, when he unsuccessfully ran for a seat in the Ohio House of Representatives. In 1994, he was elected to represent Ohio's 57th House District. He served three consecutive terms from January 1995 through December 2000, when he lost his reelection campaign to Democrat John Boccieri.

During his early legislative career, Hood supported reducing government spending, changing labor laws, and expanding firearm rights. He introduced legislation seeking to establish right-to-work laws in Ohio, sponsored proposals to repeal prevailing wage requirements, and supported legislation permitting concealed firearm carry without a government-issued license. He also opposed state budgets that he considered excessive.

Outside the legislature, Hood worked as communications director for the National Right to Work Committee, an organization advocating against compulsory union membership.

In 2004, Hood sought a return to the Ohio House, winning a four-candidate Republican primary for the 91st District. He subsequently won the general election and served from January 2005 through December 2006.

=== Return to the Ohio House (2013–2020) ===
Hood returned to the Ohio House of Representatives in January 2013, representing the 78th District. He was reelected in 2014, 2016, and 2018, serving until December 31, 2020.

His legislative positions included opposition to compulsory union membership, support for expanded firearm rights, restrictions on abortion, and reductions in government spending. During his legislative career, he served on the House Commerce and Labor Committee and the House Criminal Justice Committee.

=== Abortion legislation ===
Hood was a supporter of legislation restricting abortion and participated in multiple efforts to enact fetal heartbeat legislation in Ohio.

In 2015, Hood and Representative Christina Hagan sponsored House Bill 69, commonly known as the Heartbeat Bill. The legislation proposed restricting abortions after the detection of fetal cardiac activity. On March 25, 2015, the Ohio House of Representatives passed the bill by a vote of 55–40. The measure did not become law.

In 2017, Hood and Hagan introduced another version of the Heartbeat Bill, House Bill 258. The legislation passed the Ohio House in November 2018 and subsequently passed the Ohio Senate. Governor John Kasich vetoed the legislation in December 2018. The Ohio House voted to override the veto, but the Senate sustained the governor's objection, preventing the bill from becoming law.

In 2019, Hood and Representative Candice Keller sponsored House Bill 413, which proposed establishing the criminal offenses of aggravated abortion murder and abortion murder. The legislation also contained provisions addressing medical exceptions to its abortion restrictions. The bill was referred to the House Criminal Justice Committee but did not become law.

Hood's involvement in multiple heartbeat bills formed part of his broader legislative advocacy for restrictions on abortion.

=== Congressional and gubernatorial campaigns (2021–2024) ===
Following his departure from the Ohio House, Hood continued seeking elected office.

In 2021, Hood ran in the Republican primary for the special election in Ohio's 15th Congressional District. The nomination was won by Mike Carey.

In February 2022, Hood entered the Republican primary for governor of Ohio, selecting former state Representative Candice Keller as his running mate. The campaign emphasized conservative positions on abortion, firearm rights, and other state policy issues. Hood competed against incumbent Governor Mike DeWine, Jim Renacci, and Joe Blystone. DeWine won the Republican nomination.

In 2024, Hood sought the Republican nomination for Ohio's 2nd Congressional District. He was unsuccessful in the primary election.

Hood served a total of sixteen years in the Ohio House of Representatives across three separate periods: 1995–2000, 2005–2006, and 2013–2020.

== Personal Life and Death ==
In 2001, Hood married Michal Marie Dean of Xenia, Ohio. The couple had five children and divorced in January 2020.

Hood was a Christian. Following his death, the Ohio House of Representatives adopted House Resolution 118 in his memory, describing him as a "devoted Christian" and acknowledging his commitment to his faith.

Hood died unexpectedly on April 19, 2025, at the age of 55.

Ohio House of Representatives
Preceded by Judith Carr	Member of the Ohio House of Representatives from the 57th district 1995–2000	Succeeded by John Boccieri
Preceded by Larry Householder	Member of the Ohio House of Representatives from the 91st district 2005–2006	Succeeded by Dan Dodd
Preceded by John Adams	Member of the Ohio House of Representatives from the 78th district 2013–2020	Succeeded by Brian Stewart
