= Brian Stewart (Ohio politician) =

American politician

Member of the Ohio House of Representatives from the 12th district
- Incumbent
- Assumed office January 3, 2023
- Preceded by: Juanita Brent

Member of the Ohio House of Representatives from the 78th district
- In office January 4, 2021 – December 31, 2022
- Preceded by: Ron Hood
- Succeeded by: Susan Manchester

Personal details
- Born: 1982 (age 43–44)
- Party: Republican
- Spouse: Letanya Myers (m. 2004)
- Children: 3
- Education: Ohio State University (BA, JD)

Military service
- Branch/service: United States Army
- Battles/wars: Iraq War

Brian Stewart is an American politician and attorney serving as a member of the Ohio House of Representatives from the 12th district.

== Early life and education ==
Stewart enlisted in the United States Army after graduating from Chillicothe High School in Chillicothe, Ohio. After serving in the infantry during the Iraq War, Stewart returned to Ohio, earning a bachelor's degree and Juris Doctor from Ohio State University.

== Political career ==
Stewart was elected to Village Council of Ashville, Ohio in November 2009. He earned 23.3% of the vote in the five-way, non-partisan race. In 2012, Stewart ran for Pickaway County, Ohio commissioner. He won the Republican nomination by securing 59.1% of the vote and went on to win the three-way general election with 44.6%. He was reelected to the position in 2016, with 58.3% of the vote.

Stewart was elected to the Ohio House of Representatives in November 2020, succeeding incumbent Republican Ron Hood. He defeated Democrat Charlotte Owens in 2020, winning 72.7% to 27.3%. Less than six months after beginning his term, Stewart announced that he would run for United States Congress, representing Ohio's 15th congressional district. Stewart dropped out of the race before election day citing a lack of resources.

=== 2023 constitutional referendum ===
Stewart was the creator of a proposed constitutional amendment that would have raised the threshold of a voter-led initiatives to amend the Constitution of Ohio from 50% to 60%. The measure failed with 57% voting "No" and 43% voting "Yes."

=== 136th General Assembly ===
Stewart defeated Democrat Brad Cotton, winning 72.9% to 27.1%. Stewart was made Finance Chairman of the Ohio House of Representatives for the 136th General Assembly, primarily overseeing Ohio's biennial budget. The budget passed by the General Assembly included several measures reforming Ohio's property tax laws, many of which were vetoed by Governor Mike DeWine. The budget under Stewart also created a $1.7 billion “Ohio Cultural and Sports Facility” from an unclaimed funds reserve, which included a mandatory $600 million bond to be given to the Cleveland Browns for stadium relocation.

=== Current committee assignments ===
- Finance (chair)
- Health
- Judiciary
- Medicaid
- Redistricting

== Electoral history ==
2024 Ohio House District 12 general election
Party	Candidate	Votes	%	±%
Republican	Brian Stewart	39,362	72.85%	
Democratic	Brad Cotton	14,673	27.15%	

2024 Ohio House District 12 primary election
Party	Candidate	Votes	%	±%
Republican	Brian Stewart	9,537	57.15%	
Republican	Patty Hamilton	7,150	42.85%	

2022 Ohio House District 12 general election
Party	Candidate	Votes	%	±%
Republican	Brian Stewart	29,571	99.62%	+26.91%
Write-in	Matthew Briner	114	0.38%	

2020 Ohio House District 78 general election
Party	Candidate	Votes	%	±%
Republican	Brian Stewart	42,314	72.71%	
Democratic	Charlotte Owens	15,878	27.29%	

2020 Ohio House District 78 primary election
Party	Candidate	Votes	%	±%
Republican	Brian Stewart	7,820	66.93%	
Republican	Bobby Mitchell	2,939	25.16%	
Republican	Aaron Adams	924	7.91%	

2016 Pickaway County Commissioner general election
Party	Candidate	Votes	%	±%
Republican	Brian Stewart	13,580	58.31%	+13.74%
Democratic	John R. Ankrom	9,709	41.69%	+10.36%

2012 Pickaway County Commissioner general election
Party	Candidate	Votes	%	±%
Republican	Brian Stewart	9,838	44.57%	
Democratic	Daniel V. Bradhurst	6,915	31.33%	
Independent	Mark G. Perrill	5,322	24.11%	

2012 Pickaway County Commissioner primary election
Party	Candidate	Votes	%	±%
Republican	Brian Stewart	3,831	59.12%	
Republican	Jayme Hartley Fountain	2,649	40.88%	

2009 Village of Ashville Council general election
Party	Candidate	Votes	%	±%
Independent	Brian Stewart	582	23.28%	
Independent	Glenn Cook	558	22.32%	
Independent	Gayle Blakenship	491	19.64%	
Independent	Keith A. Moore	465	18.60%	
Independent	Chester Gloyd	404	16.16%	
