= 2022 United States Senate election in Ohio =

- November 8, 2022
- Turnout: 52.32% (▼19.01 pp)
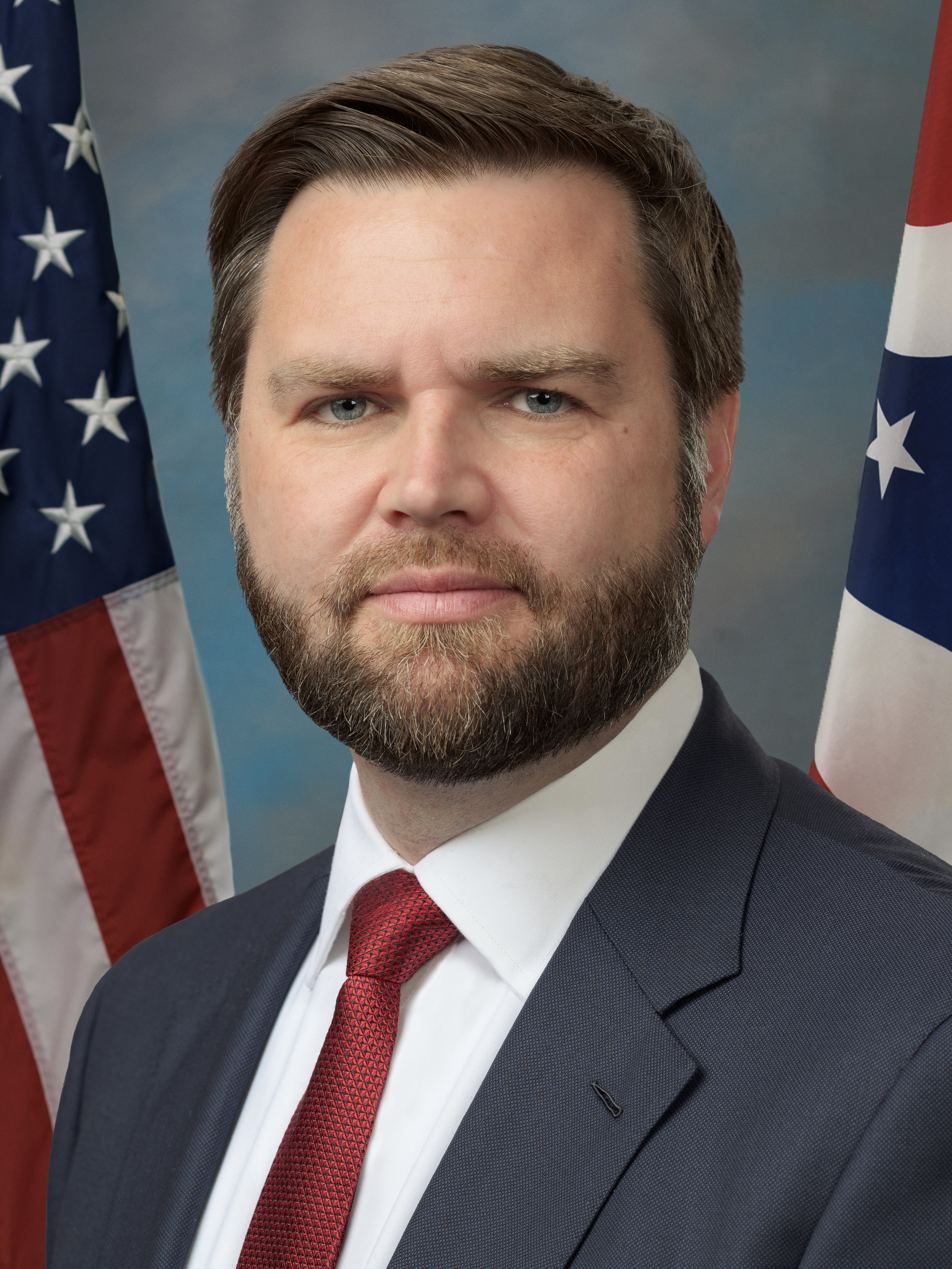

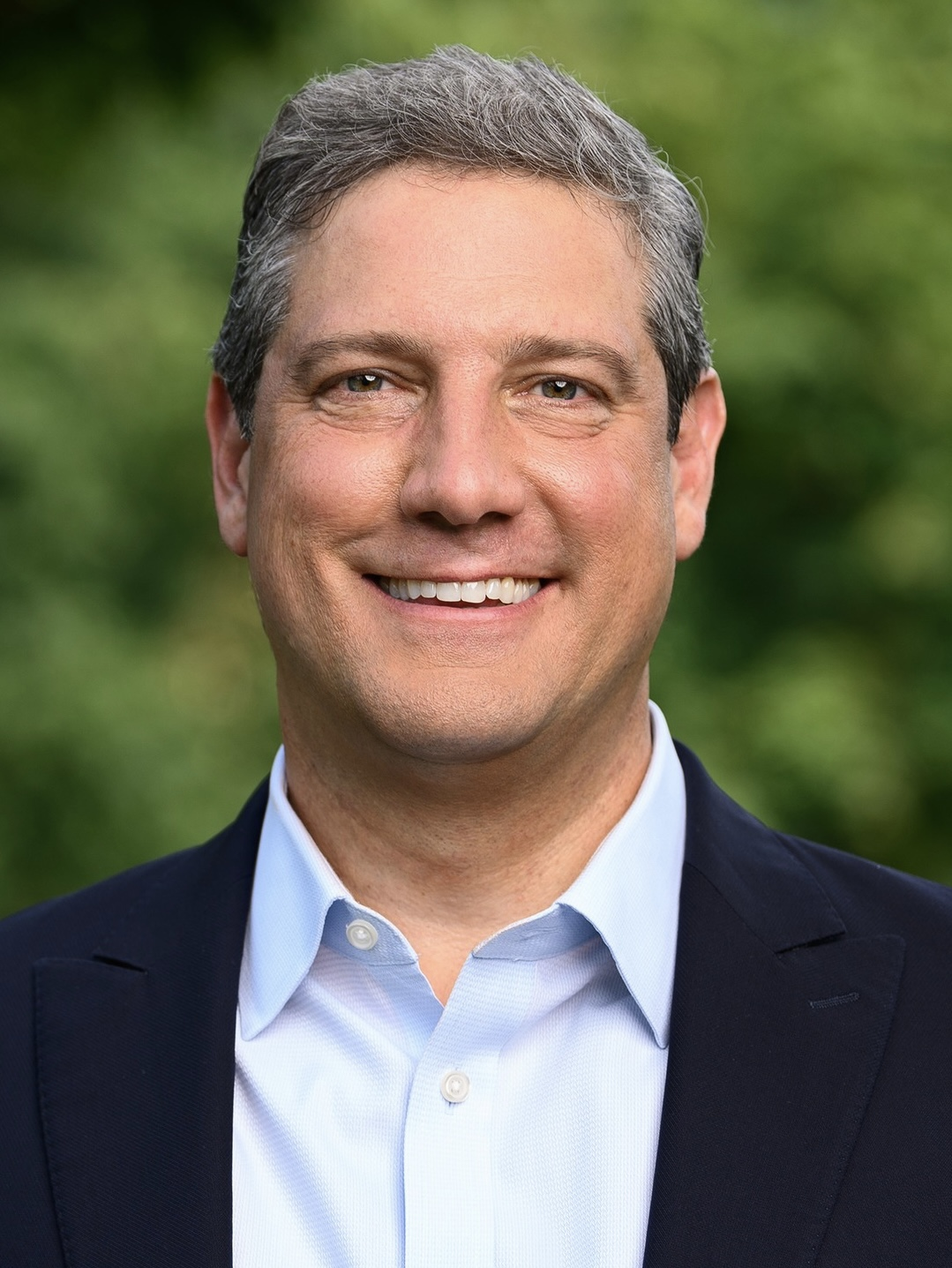
| Nominee | JD Vance | Tim Ryan |
| Party | Republican | Democratic |
| Popular vote | 2,192,114 | 1,939,489 |
| Percentage | 53.03% | 46.92% |
- Vance: 50–60% 60–70% 70–80% 80–90% >90% Ryan: 50–60% 60–70% 70–80% 80–90% >90% Tie: 50%
U.S. senator before election
Rob Portman
Republican
Elected U.S. senator
JD Vance
Republican

The 2022 United States Senate election in Ohio was held on November 8, 2022, to elect a member of the United States Senate to represent the state of Ohio. Republican writer and venture capitalist JD Vance defeated Democratic U.S. representative Tim Ryan to succeed retiring incumbent Republican Rob Portman.

Vance won by a 6.1 point margin, which was significantly closer than all other concurrently held elections for statewide offices in Ohio won by Republicans, but fairly consistent with polling for the election. Despite his defeat, Ryan flipped four counties carried by Portman in re-election in 2016: Summit, Montgomery, Hamilton, and Lorain, the latter of which Trump won in 2020; however, Vance scored wins in Ryan's home county of Trumbull and the industrial-based Mahoning County that contains much of Youngstown. Both counties were represented by Ryan in his congressional district.

Vance was endorsed by Donald Trump and became the only candidate in the seven statewide general election races funded by Trump's PAC to win. In 2025, Vance resigned from the Senate to become the 50th vice president of the United States under Trump.

== Republican primary ==
As a result of Portman's retirement, this primary was expected to be one of the most competitive in the nation. Due to his high approval ratings within the Republican Party, most of the candidates sought the endorsement of then-former president Donald Trump. Former state treasurer Josh Mandel, who had been the Republican nominee for Senate in 2012, led most polls until late January, when businessman Mike Gibbons surged after spending millions in TV ads. At a forum in March 2022, Gibbons and Mandel got into a forceful argument over Mandel's private sector experience. The debate moderator intervened after it was feared that the two candidates would come to blows. On April 9, Gibbons said that middle-class Americans don't pay enough in income taxes, which immediately led to his poll numbers plummeting. On April 15, Trump endorsed writer and commentator JD Vance, who had criticized him in the past.

Vance had been trailing in the polls, but as a result of Trump's support, he surged to become the race's frontrunner for the first time and led in most polls up to election day. Meanwhile, State Senator Matt Dolan, who disavowed Trump's false claims of voter fraud in the 2020 United States presidential election, saw a late surge after buying ad time. Vance won with 32% of the vote with Mandel in second and Dolan in a close third. The primary was considered by many as a test of Trump's influence over the Republican Party as he won Ohio by 8 points in 2020. The primary was also the most expensive in the state's history, with the candidates spending a combined $66 million throughout the campaign.

=== Candidates ===
==== Nominee ====
- JD Vance, author of Hillbilly Elegy, U.S. Marine Corps veteran, and venture capitalist

==== Eliminated in primary ====
- Matt Dolan, state senator from the 24th district since 2017 and nominee for Cuyahoga County executive in 2010
- Mike Gibbons, investment banker (founder of Brown Gibbons Lang & Company) and candidate for the U.S. Senate in 2018
- Josh Mandel, U.S. Marine Corps Reserve Iraq War veteran, former Ohio state treasurer (2011–2019), nominee for the U.S. Senate in 2012 and candidate for the U.S. Senate in 2018
- Neil Patel, businessman
- Mark Pukita, IT executive
- Jane Timken, former chair of the Ohio Republican Party (2017–2021)

==== Withdrawn ====
- John Berman, electronic hardware design, test engineer and candidate for U.S. Senate (Minnesota and Kansas) in 2020
- Bernie Moreno, businessman

==== Disqualified ====
- Bill Graham, attorney
- Mike Holt
- Michael Leipold, MedFlight pilot and retired U.S. Army chief warrant officer
- MacKenzie Thompson, U.S. Air Force veteran

==== Declined ====
- Troy Balderson, U.S. representative for Ohio's 12th congressional district (2018–present)
- Warren Davidson, U.S. representative for Ohio's 8th congressional district (2016–present)
- Anthony Gonzalez, U.S. representative for Ohio's 16th congressional district (2019–2023)
- Jon Husted, lieutenant governor of Ohio (2019–present) (ran for re-election)
- Bill Johnson, U.S. representative for Ohio's 6th congressional district (2011–2024)
- Jim Jordan, U.S. representative for Ohio's 4th congressional district (2007–present) (running for re-election)
- David Joyce, U.S. representative for Ohio's 14th congressional district (2013–present) (ran for re-election)
- John Kasich, former governor of Ohio (2011–2019) and candidate for President of the United States in 2000 and 2016
- Mark Kvamme, co-founder of Drive Capital
- Frank LaRose, Ohio secretary of state (2019–present) (endorsed Vance) (ran for re-election)
- Rob Portman, incumbent U.S. Senator (2011–2023)
- Vivek Ramaswamy, entrepreneur, author and businessman
- Jim Renacci, former U.S. representative for Ohio's 16th congressional district (2011–2019) and nominee for U.S. Senate in 2018 (ran for governor)
- Geraldo Rivera, journalist, author, attorney, and former TV host
- Darrell C. Scott, pastor and CEO of the National Diversity Coalition for Trump (endorsed Moreno) (expressed interest in running for Ohio's 16th congressional district)
- Steve Stivers, former U.S. representative for Ohio's 15th congressional district (2011–2021)
- Pat Tiberi, former U.S. representative for Ohio's 12th congressional district (2001–2018)
- Jim Tressel, president of Youngstown State University and former Ohio State football coach
- Mike Turner, U.S. representative for Ohio's 10th congressional district (2003–present) (ran for re-election)
- Brad Wenstrup, U.S. representative for Ohio's 2nd congressional district (2013–present) (ran for re-election)
- Dave Yost, attorney general of Ohio (2019–present) and former Ohio state auditor (2011–2019) (ran for re-election)

=== Endorsements ===
Matt Dolan

U.S. governors

- Bob Taft, 67th governor of Ohio (1999–2007)

State officials

- Betty Montgomery, 30th Auditor of Ohio (2003–2007) and 45th Attorney General of Ohio (1995–2003)

State senators

- Jay Hottinger, president pro tempore of the Ohio Senate (2021–present) and state senator from the 31st district (2015–present)

State representatives

- Jo Ann Davidson, former Speaker of the Ohio House of Representatives (1995–2000) and former state representative from the 24th district (1981–2000)

Newspapers and other media

- The Plain Dealer (Republican primary only)

Organizations

- Franklin County Republican Party
- Knox County Republican Party
Mike Gibbons

U.S. Senators

- Rand Paul, U.S. Senator from Kentucky (2011–present)

U.S. Representatives

- Kat Cammack, U.S. Representative for FL-03 (2021–present)

State senators

- Sandra O'Brien, state senator from the 32nd district (2021–present)

Individuals

- Bill Stepien, political consultant, former campaign manager to Donald Trump's 2020 campaign

Organizations

- Cuyahoga County Republican Party
Josh Mandel

Executive branch officials

- Elan Carr, former United States Special Envoy for Monitoring and Combating Anti-Semitism (2019–2021)
- Michael Flynn, 25th United States National Security Advisor (2017) (Democratic)

U.S. Ambassadors

- David M. Friedman, former Ambassador of the United States to Israel (2017–2021)

U.S. Senators

- Ted Cruz, U.S. Senator from Texas (2013–present)
- Mike Lee, U.S. Senator from Utah (2011–present)
- Cynthia Lummis, U.S. Senator from Wyoming (2021–present)

U.S. Representatives

- Madison Cawthorn, U.S. Representative for NC-11 (2021–2023)
- David McIntosh, former U.S. Representative for IN-02 (1995–2001) and president of Club for Growth

Individuals

- Jon P. Diamond, businessman
- Jenna Ellis, lawyer, former legal adviser to Donald Trump's 2020 campaign
- Howard Friedman, former president of the American Israel Public Affairs Committee
- Mark Levin, lawyer, author, and radio personality; host of The Mark Levin Show
- Dennis Prager, conservative activist and founder of PragerU
- Seth M. Siegel, author and activist

Organizations

- Club for Growth
Jane Timken

Executive branch officials

- Kellyanne Conway, former Senior Counselor to the President (2017–2020)

U.S. governors

- Kristi Noem, 33rd Governor of South Dakota (2019–present) and former U.S. Representative for SD-AL (2011–2019)

U.S. Senators

- Shelley Moore Capito, U.S. Senator from West Virginia (2015–present)
- Joni Ernst, U.S. Senator from Iowa (2015–present)
- Deb Fischer, U.S. Senator from Nebraska (2013–present)
- Rob Portman, U.S. Senator from Ohio (2011–2023)

U.S. Representatives

- Bob Gibbs, U.S. Representative for OH-07 (2011–2023)
- Elise Stefanik, U.S. Representative for NY-21 (2015–present)

State senators

- Louis Blessing, state senator from the 8th district (2019–present) and former state representative from the 29th district (2013–2019)
- Michael Rulli, state senator from the 33rd district (2019–present)
- Kirk Schuring, Majority Leader of the Ohio Senate (2021–present), state senator from the 29th district (2019–present), former Acting Speaker of the Ohio House of Representatives (2018) and former state representative from the 48th district (2011–2018)
- Steve Wilson, state senator from the 7th district (2017–present)

State representatives

- Cindy Abrams, state representative from the 80th district (2019–present)
- Brian Baldridge, state representative from the 90th district (2019–present)
- Jon Cross, state representative from the 83rd district (2019–present)
- Haraz Ghanbari, state representative from the 3rd district (2019–present)
- Brett Hillyer, state representative from the 98th district (2019–present)
- David Johnson, former state representative from the 55th district (1979–1994, 1975–1976)
- Laura Lanese, state representative from the 23rd district (2017–present)
- Scott Oelslager, state representative from the 48th district (2019–present, 2003–2010) and former state senator from the 29th district (2011–2018)
- Bill Seitz, Majority Leader of the Ohio House of Representatives (2017–present), state representative from the 30th district (2017–present) and former state senator from the 8th district (2007–2016)
- Reggie Stoltzfus, state representative from the 50th district (2019–present)

Local officials

- Donna Owens, former mayor of Toledo

Individuals

- Colleen Mary O'Toole, former judge on the Ohio Eleventh District Court of Appeals
- Alex Triantafilou, chair of the Hamilton County Republican Party
- Bryan C. Williams, vice chair of the Ohio Republican Party, chair of the Summit County Republican Party, former acting chair of the Ohio Republican Party, and former state representative from the 41st district (1997–2004)

Organizations

- Columbiana County Republican Party
- Maggie's List
JD Vance

U.S. Presidents

- Donald Trump, 45th president of the United States (2017–2021)

Executive branch officials

- Robert Lighthizer, former United States Trade Representative (2017–2021)
- Robert C. O'Brien, former United States National Security Advisor (2019–2021)
- Andrew R. Wheeler, former EPA Administrator (2019–2021)

U.S. Senators

- Josh Hawley, U.S. Senator from Missouri (2019–present)

U.S. Representatives

- Jim Banks, U.S. Representative for IN-03 (2017–2025) and chair of the Republican Study Committee
- Marjorie Taylor Greene, U.S. Representative for GA-14 (2021–2026)

State officials

- Frank LaRose, Secretary of State of Ohio (2019–present)

Individuals

- Tucker Carlson, political commentator on Fox News
- Charlie Kirk, conservative activist and founder of Turning Point USA
- Nick Fuentes, host of America First and the leader of the Groypers
- Bernie Moreno, candidate for U.S. senate in Ohio in 2022
- Penny Nance, president of Concerned Women for America
- Peter Thiel, co-founder of PayPal and venture capitalist
- Donald Trump Jr., businessman and son of then-former President Donald Trump

Newspapers and other media

- The American Conservative
- Pittsburgh Post-Gazette

Organizations

- Ohio Right to Life
- Ohio Veterans United
- Turning Point Action
Bernie Moreno (withdrawn and endorsed JD Vance)

Executive branch officials

- Kellyanne Conway, former Senior Counselor to the President (2017–2020)
- Ja'Ron Smith, former deputy director of the Office of American Innovation (2019–2020)

U.S. Ambassadors

- David T. Fischer, former Ambassador of the United States to Morocco (2020–2021)
- Ed McMullen, former Ambassador of the United States to Switzerland and Liechtenstein (2017–2021)

Individuals

- Katrina Pierson, activist and communications consultant
- Darrell C. Scott, pastor and CEO of the National Diversity Coalition for Trump

Labor unions

- National Border Patrol Council

Organizations

- Clermont County Republican Party
Declined to endorse

Organizations

- Hamilton County Republican Party
- Ohio Republican Party

=== Polling ===
==== Graphical summary ====
| Source of poll aggregation | Dates administered | Dates updated | Matt Dolan | Mike Gibbons | Josh Mandel | Jane Timken | JD Vance | Other (Note: Calculated by taking the difference of 100% and all other candidates combined.) | Margin |
|---|---|---|---|---|---|---|---|---|---|
| Real Clear Politics | April 28 – May 1, 2022 | May 2, 2022 | 21.5% | 15.0% | 22.5% | 7.0% | 26.0% | 8.0% | Vance +3.5 |

| Poll source | Date(s) administered | Sample size (Note: Key: A – all adults RV – registered voters LV – likely voters V – unclear) | Margin of error | Matt Dolan | Mike Gibbons | Josh Mandel | Bernie Moreno | Jane Timken | Mike Turner | JD Vance | Other | Undecided |
|---|---|---|---|---|---|---|---|---|---|---|---|---|
| The Trafalgar Group (R) | April 29 – May 1, 2022 | 1,081 (LV) | ± 3.0% | 22% | 13% | 21% | – | 6% | – | 26% | 4% (Note: Patel and Pukita with 2%) | 9% |
| Emerson College | April 28–29, 2022 | 885 (LV) | ± 3.2% | 18% | 14% | 22% | – | 7% | – | 24% | 4% (Note: Pukita with 2%; Graham and Patel with 1%) | 11% |
| Fabrizio Lee (R) (Note: This poll was sponsored by Protect Ohio Values PAC, which supports Vance) | April 25–26, 2022 | 800 (LV) | ± 3.5% | 12% | 12% | 19% | – | 8% | – | 31% | 0% | 17% |
| Blueprint Polling (D) | April 21–24, 2022 | 634 (LV) | ± 3.9% | 18% | 13% | 12% | – | 7% | – | 17% | – | 33% |
| Fox News | April 20–24, 2022 | 906 (LV) | ± 3.0% | 11% | 13% | 18% | – | 6% | – | 23% | 2% (Note: Patel and Pukita with 1%, "Other" (volunteered response) with <1%) | 25% |
| Fabrizio Lee (R) | April 18–19, 2022 | 800 (LV) | ± 3.5% | 9% | 13% | 18% | – | 11% | – | 25% | <1% | 23% |
| The Trafalgar Group (R) | April 13–14, 2022 | 1,078 (LV) | ± 3.0% | 12% | 14% | 28% | – | 8% | – | 23% | 3% (Note: Pukita with 2%, Patel with 1%) | 13% |
| Remington Research Group (R) (Note: This poll was sponsored by Mandel's campaign) | April 11–12, 2022 | 884 (LV) | ± 3.3% | 15% | 17% | 23% | – | 12% | – | 10% | 3% | 20% |
| Moore Information Group (R) (Note: This poll was sponsored by Timken's campaign) | April 3–4, 2022 | 2,500 (LV) | ± 2.0% | 13% | 20% | 16% | – | 15% | – | 10% | – | 26% |
| Fabrizio Lee (R) | March 30–31, 2022 | 800 (LV) | ± 3.5% | 9% | 18% | 18% | – | 9% | – | 18% | – | 29% |
| University of Akron | February 17 – March 15, 2022 | – (LV) | – | 5% | 21% | 22% | – | 6% | – | 10% | 4% | 34% |
| Fox News | March 2–6, 2022 | 918 (LV) | ± 3.0% | 7% | 22% | 20% | – | 9% | – | 11% | 3% (Note: Patel with 2%, Pukita with 1%, "Other" (volunteered response) with <1%) | 24% |
| Emerson College | February 25–26, 2022 | 410 (LV) | ± 4.8% | 6% | 22% | 15% | – | 6% | – | 8% | 4% (Note: Graham with 3%; Patel with 1%; Pukita with 0%) | 39% |
| Fabrizio Lee (R) | February 23–24, 2022 | 800 (LV) | ± 3.5% | 8% | 18% | 14% | – | 12% | – | 14% | – | 34% |
| Cygnal (R) (Note: This poll was sponsored by Gibbons's campaign) | February 8–10, 2022 | 609 (LV) | ± 4.0% | 6% | 23% | 11% | – | 8% | – | 9% | – | 44% |
| The Trafalgar Group (R) | February 8–10, 2022 | 1,085 (LV) | ± 3.0% | 10% | 16% | 21% | – | 10% | – | 14% | 3% | 25% |
| co/efficient (R) | February 6–8, 2022 | 613 (LV) | ± 4.0% | 7% | 20% | 18% | – | 6% | – | 5% | 10% (Note: Someone else with 9%, Pukita with 1%) | 34% |
| | February 3, 2022 | Moreno withdraws from the race | | | | | | | | | | |
| WPA Intelligence (R) | January 30 – February 1, 2022 | 514 (LV) | ± 4.4% | 5% | 17% | 28% | 6% | 9% | – | 13% | – | 22% |
| Cygnal (R) | January 28–30, 2022 | 929 (LV) | ± 3.2% | 3% | 16% | 13% | 6% | 8% | – | 10% | – | 45% |
| Fabrizio Lee (R) | January 18–20, 2022 | 800 (LV) | ± 3.5% | 3% | 14% | 15% | 11% | 13% | – | 9% | 1% | 34% |
| KAConsulting LLC (R) (Note: This poll was sponsored by Moreno's campaign) | January 11–13, 2022 | 600 (LV) | ± 4.0% | 3% | 10% | 20% | 10% | 18% | – | 10% | – | 24% |
| WPA Intelligence (R) (Note: This poll was sponsored by Club for Growth Action, which endorsed Mandel) | January 5–6, 2022 | 513 (LV) | ± 4.4% | 4% | 14% | 26% | 7% | 15% | – | 10% | 8% | 16% |
| Moore Information Group (R) | January 3, 2022 | 1,000 (LV) | ± 3.1% | 4% | 14% | 18% | 9% | 16% | – | 8% | – | 31% |
| The Trafalgar Group (R) | December 12–15, 2021 | 1,053 (LV) | ± 3.0% | 5% | 12% | 21% | 2% | 10% | – | 15% | – | 34% |
| Moore Information Group (R) | November 29, 2021 | 1,000 (LV) | ± 3.1% | 4% | 13% | 21% | 3% | 17% | – | 10% | – | 32% |
| Fabrizio Lee (R) | November 21–23, 2021 | 600 (LV) | ± 4.0% | 2% | 7% | 18% | 2% | 10% | 6% | 10% | – | 45% |
| Fabrizio Lee (R) | October 17–18, 2021 | 600 (LV) | ± 4.0% | 3% | 6% | 19% | 1% | 4% | 7% | 16% | – | 43% |
| Moore Information Group (R) | September 2021 | – (LV) | – | 6% | 12% | 22% | 3% | 11% | – | 9% | – | 37% |
| WPA Intelligence (R) | September 20–23, 2021 | 510 (LV) | ± 4.3% | 3% | 8% | 37% | 1% | 6% | – | 13% | 6% | 26% |
| Remington Research Group (R) | September 6–7, 2021 | 980 (LV) | ± 3.0% | 2% | 5% | 34% | 2% | 11% | – | 16% | – | 30% |
| Fabrizio Lee (R) | August 17–19, 2021 | 800 (LV) | ± 3.5% | 2% | 4% | 19% | 1% | 5% | 5% | 13% | – | 51% |
| WPA Intelligence (R) | July 27–29, 2021 | 500 (LV) | ± 4.4% | 3% | 3% | 40% | 1% | 8% | – | 12% | 13% | 20% |
| Fabrizio Lee (R) | July 20–22, 2021 | 800 (LV) | ± 3.5% | 1% | 2% | 21% | 2% | 7% | 7% | 12% | – | 48% |
| Fabrizio Lee (R) | June 15–17, 2021 | 800 (LV) | ± 3.5% | 2% | 2% | 22% | 1% | 8% | 6% | 4% | – | 55% |
| Remington Research Group (R) | June 1–3, 2021 | 1,040 (LV) | ± 3.0% | 2% | 5% | 35% | 2% | 16% | – | 6% | – | 34% |
| Moore Information Group (R) | May 26, 2021 | 600 (LV) | ± 4.0% | 2% | 7% | 24% | 1% | 19% | 8% | 4% | – | 35% |
| Moore Information Group (R) | April 2021 | 600 (LV) | ± 4.0% | – | 1% | 23% | 1% | 14% | 7% | 4% | – | 37% |
| Fabrizio Lee (R) | April 20–22, 2021 | 800 (LV) | ± 3.5% | – | 2% | 25% | 2% | 8% | 7% | 6% | – | 51% |
| Moore Information Group (R) | March 2021 | 600 (LV) | ± 4.0% | – | 2% | 28% | – | 11% | 7% | 2% | – | 37% |
| Moore Information Group (R) | February 2021 | 600 (LV) | ± 4.0% | – | 2% | 20% | – | 5% | 8% | – | – | 50% |

Hypothetical polling

| Poll source | Date(s) administered | Sample size | Margin of error | Mike Gibbons | Josh Mandel | Bernie Moreno | Steve Stivers | Jane Timken | Undecided |
|---|---|---|---|---|---|---|---|---|---|
| Remington Research Group (R) | June 1–3, 2021 | 1,040 (LV) | ± 3.0% | – | 45% | – | – | 22% | 33% |
| WPA Intelligence (R) (Note: This poll was sponsored by Club for Growth Action) | February 1–3, 2021 | 509 (LV) | ± 4.4% | 3% | 38% | 2% | 11% | 6% | 39% |

=== Results ===
Results by county Vance: 20–30%; 30–40%; 40–50%; Mandel: 20–30%; 30–40%; Dolan: 30–40%; 40–50%

Republican primary results
| Party | Candidate | Votes | % |
|---|---|---|---|
| Republican | JD Vance | 344,736 | 32.22% |
| Republican | Josh Mandel | 255,854 | 23.92% |
| Republican | Matt Dolan | 249,239 | 23.30% |
| Republican | Mike Gibbons | 124,653 | 11.65% |
| Republican | Jane Timken | 62,779 | 5.87% |
| Republican | Mark Pukita | 22,692 | 2.12% |
| Republican | Neil Patel | 9,873 | 0.92% |
| Total votes | | 1,069,826 | 100.0% |

==== By county ====
| | JD Vance | | Josh Mandel | | Matt Dolan | | Mike Gibbons | | Jane Timken | | Mark Pukita | | Neil Patel | | Margin | | Total |
| County | Votes | % | Votes | % | Votes | % | Votes | % | Votes | % | Votes | % | Votes | % | Votes | % | Votes |
|---|---|---|---|---|---|---|---|---|---|---|---|---|---|---|---|---|---|
| Adams | 1,134 | 36.69% | 867 | 28.05% | 368 | 11.91% | 449 | 14.53% | 198 | 6.41% | 53 | 1.71% | 22 | 0.71% | 267 | 8.64% | 3,091 |
| Allen | 3,346 | 30.09% | 3,970 | 35.70% | 1,737 | 15.62% | 569 | 5.12% | 990 | 8.90% | 430 | 3.87% | 79 | 0.71% | -624 | -5.61% | 11,121 |
| Ashland | 2,197 | 29.22% | 2,190 | 29.13% | 1,368 | 18.19% | 920 | 12.24% | 438 | 5.83% | 295 | 3.92% | 111 | 1.48% | 7 | 0.09% | 7,519 |
| Ashtabula | 3,041 | 34.00% | 2,499 | 27.94% | 1,702 | 19.03% | 951 | 10.63% | 491 | 5.49% | 184 | 2.06% | 75 | 0.84% | 542 | 6.06% | 8,943 |
| Athens | 1,141 | 36.43% | 818 | 26.12% | 573 | 18.30% | 352 | 11.24% | 142 | 4.53% | 45 | 1.44% | 61 | 1.95% | 323 | 10.31% | 3,132 |
| Auglaize | 1,993 | 29.97% | 2,213 | 33.28% | 946 | 14.23% | 690 | 10.38% | 583 | 8.77% | 173 | 2.60% | 51 | 0.77% | -220 | -3.31% | 6,649 |
| Belmont | 2,637 | 39.32% | 2,143 | 31.96% | 677 | 10.10% | 427 | 6.37% | 631 | 9.41% | 117 | 1.74% | 74 | 1.10% | 494 | 7.37% | 6,706 |
| Brown | 1,581 | 36.61% | 1,168 | 27.04% | 557 | 12.90% | 607 | 14.05% | 283 | 6.55% | 94 | 2.18% | 29 | 0.67% | 413 | 9.56% | 4,319 |
| Butler | 11,946 | 36.10% | 7,662 | 23.15% | 7,114 | 21.50% | 3,888 | 11.75% | 1,853 | 5.56% | 346 | 1.05% | 286 | 0.86% | 4,284 | 12.94% | 33,095 |
| Carroll | 1,181 | 31.62% | 1,105 | 29.59% | 535 | 14.32% | 406 | 10.87% | 376 | 10.07% | 92 | 2.46% | 40 | 1.07% | 76 | 2.03% | 3,735 |
| Champaign | 1,933 | 33.42% | 1,554 | 26.87% | 1,107 | 19.14% | 683 | 11.81% | 285 | 4.93% | 154 | 2.66% | 68 | 1.18% | 379 | 6.55% | 5,784 |
| Clark | 4,364 | 29.37% | 3,971 | 26.72% | 3,404 | 22.91% | 1,671 | 11.25% | 847 | 5.70% | 470 | 3.16% | 132 | 0.89% | 393 | 2.64% | 14,859 |
| Clermont | 7,986 | 35.18% | 4,943 | 21.77% | 4,615 | 20.33% | 3,022 | 13.31% | 1,627 | 7.17% | 309 | 1.36% | 199 | 0.88% | 3,043 | 13.40% | 22,701 |
| Clinton | 1,819 | 34.22% | 1,357 | 25.53% | 874 | 16.44% | 779 | 14.66% | 305 | 5.74% | 100 | 1.88% | 81 | 1.52% | 462 | 8.69% | 5,315 |
| Columbiana | 3,783 | 33.32% | 2,148 | 18.92% | 1,858 | 16.37% | 1,638 | 14.43% | 1,301 | 11.46% | 536 | 4.72% | 89 | 0.78% | 1,635 | 14.40% | 11,353 |
| Coshocton | 1,629 | 28.33% | 1,791 | 31.14% | 897 | 15.60% | 890 | 15.48% | 334 | 5.81% | 124 | 2.16% | 86 | 1.50% | -162 | -2.82% | 5,751 |
| Crawford | 1,677 | 29.29% | 1,852 | 32.35% | 891 | 15.56% | 777 | 13.57% | 337 | 5.89% | 134 | 2.34% | 57 | 1.00% | -175 | -3.06% | 5,725 |
| Cuyahoga | 17,056 | 26.05% | 13,774 | 21.04% | 22,710 | 34.69% | 8,559 | 13.07% | 1,958 | 2.99% | 985 | 1.50% | 429 | 0.66% | -5,654 | -8.64% | 65,471 |
| Darke | 2,726 | 28.97% | 2,955 | 31.41% | 1,399 | 14.87% | 1,575 | 16.74% | 466 | 4.95% | 200 | 2.13% | 88 | 0.94% | -229 | -2.43% | 9,409 |
| Defiance | 1,768 | 35.58% | 1,151 | 23.16% | 633 | 12.74% | 723 | 14.55% | 179 | 3.60% | 446 | 8.98% | 69 | 1.39% | 617 | 12.42% | 4,969 |
| Delaware | 9,662 | 35.38% | 5,067 | 18.56% | 8,030 | 29.41% | 2,543 | 9.31% | 1,165 | 4.27% | 381 | 1.40% | 459 | 1.68% | 1,632 | 5.98% | 27,307 |
| Erie | 2,531 | 34.21% | 1,838 | 24.84% | 1,655 | 22.37% | 839 | 11.34% | 297 | 4.01% | 189 | 2.55% | 49 | 0.66% | 693 | 9.37% | 7,398 |
| Fairfield | 6,232 | 35.62% | 3,985 | 22.78% | 4,222 | 24.13% | 1,917 | 10.96% | 677 | 3.87% | 337 | 1.93% | 127 | 0.73% | 2,010 | 11.49% | 17,497 |
| Fayette | 971 | 29.92% | 838 | 25.82% | 633 | 19.51% | 579 | 17.84% | 142 | 4.38% | 40 | 1.23% | 42 | 1.29% | 133 | 4.10% | 3,245 |
| Franklin | 22,336 | 30.89% | 12,335 | 17.06% | 26,610 | 36.80% | 6,130 | 8.48% | 2,869 | 3.97% | 1,210 | 1.67% | 813 | 1.12% | -4,274 | -5.91% | 72,303 |
| Fulton | 2,025 | 30.58% | 1,644 | 24.82% | 1,029 | 15.54% | 1,294 | 19.54% | 383 | 5.78% | 183 | 2.76% | 65 | 0.98% | 381 | 5.75% | 6,623 |
| Gallia | 1,426 | 34.09% | 1,063 | 25.41% | 418 | 9.99% | 338 | 8.08% | 548 | 13.10% | 322 | 7.70% | 68 | 1.63% | 363 | 8.68% | 4,183 |
| Geauga | 4,141 | 25.07% | 3,314 | 20.06% | 6,818 | 41.27% | 1,292 | 7.82% | 573 | 3.47% | 232 | 1.40% | 151 | 0.91% | -2,677 | -16.20% | 16,521 |
| Greene | 6,783 | 31.22% | 5,201 | 23.94% | 5,494 | 25.29% | 2,482 | 11.42% | 1,162 | 5.35% | 410 | 1.89% | 195 | 0.90% | 1,289 | 5.93% | 21,727 |
| Guernsey | 1,245 | 32.52% | 1,153 | 30.11% | 724 | 18.91% | 468 | 12.22% | 128 | 3.34% | 83 | 2.17% | 28 | 0.73% | 92 | 2.40% | 3,829 |
| Hamilton | 17,043 | 30.83% | 10,661 | 19.29% | 15,150 | 27.41% | 6,194 | 11.21% | 5,155 | 9.33% | 523 | 0.95% | 550 | 1.00% | 1,893 | 3.42% | 55,276 |
| Hancock | 2,813 | 28.87% | 2,132 | 21.88% | 2,474 | 25.39% | 1,510 | 15.50% | 434 | 4.45% | 311 | 3.19% | 71 | 0.73% | 339 | 3.48% | 9,745 |
| Hardin | 1,075 | 28.35% | 1,199 | 31.62% | 687 | 18.12% | 487 | 12.84% | 216 | 5.70% | 80 | 2.11% | 48 | 1.27% | -124 | -3.27% | 3,792 |
| Harrison | 644 | 34.08% | 529 | 27.99% | 186 | 9.84% | 189 | 10.00% | 288 | 15.24% | 27 | 1.43% | 27 | 1.43% | 115 | 6.08% | 1,890 |
| Henry | 1,108 | 31.50% | 730 | 20.76% | 617 | 17.54% | 694 | 19.73% | 167 | 4.75% | 173 | 4.92% | 28 | 0.80% | 378 | 10.75% | 3,517 |
| Highland | 1,640 | 37.39% | 1,148 | 26.17% | 620 | 14.14% | 575 | 13.11% | 275 | 6.27% | 80 | 1.82% | 48 | 1.09% | 492 | 11.22% | 4,386 |
| Hocking | 1,067 | 34.90% | 915 | 29.93% | 459 | 15.01% | 376 | 12.30% | 119 | 3.89% | 105 | 3.43% | 16 | 0.52% | 152 | 4.97% | 3,057 |
| Holmes | 1,176 | 34.55% | 1,034 | 30.38% | 495 | 14.54% | 330 | 9.69% | 240 | 7.05% | 110 | 3.23% | 19 | 0.56% | 142 | 4.17% | 3,404 |
| Huron | 1,872 | 31.98% | 1,748 | 29.86% | 1,076 | 18.38% | 701 | 11.97% | 217 | 3.71% | 200 | 3.42% | 40 | 0.68% | 124 | 2.17% | 5,854 |
| Jackson | 1,055 | 40.39% | 596 | 22.82% | 281 | 10.76% | 330 | 12.63% | 281 | 10.76% | 43 | 1.65% | 26 | 1.00% | 459 | 17.57% | 2,612 |
| Jefferson | 2,359 | 38.85% | 1,826 | 30.07% | 567 | 9.34% | 479 | 7.89% | 602 | 9.91% | 200 | 3.29% | 39 | 0.64% | 533 | 8.78% | 6,072 |
| Knox | 2,852 | 35.25% | 2,072 | 25.61% | 1,589 | 19.64% | 1,045 | 12.92% | 271 | 3.35% | 199 | 2.46% | 62 | 0.77% | 780 | 9.64% | 8,090 |
| Lake | 8,474 | 29.99% | 7,076 | 25.05% | 8,201 | 29.03% | 2,722 | 9.63% | 1,161 | 4.11% | 432 | 1.53% | 186 | 0.66% | 273 | 0.97% | 28,252 |
| Lawrence | 2,726 | 41.38% | 1,506 | 22.86% | 681 | 10.34% | 642 | 9.74% | 817 | 12.40% | 87 | 1.32% | 129 | 1.96% | 1,220 | 18.52% | 6,588 |
| Licking | 7,154 | 34.56% | 4,711 | 22.76% | 5,074 | 24.51% | 2,433 | 11.75% | 770 | 3.72% | 418 | 2.02% | 142 | 0.69% | 2,080 | 10.05% | 20,702 |
| Logan | 1,833 | 27.36% | 2,335 | 34.86% | 1,161 | 17.33% | 891 | 13.30% | 303 | 4.52% | 97 | 1.45% | 79 | 1.18% | -502 | -7.49% | 6,699 |
| Lorain | 7,730 | 30.23% | 6,369 | 24.91% | 6,948 | 27.18% | 2,891 | 11.31% | 1,068 | 4.18% | 406 | 1.59% | 155 | 0.61% | 782 | 3.06% | 25,567 |
| Lucas | 7,582 | 35.05% | 4,074 | 18.83% | 4,818 | 22.27% | 3,723 | 17.21% | 784 | 3.62% | 477 | 2.21% | 172 | 0.80% | 2,764 | 12.78% | 21,630 |
| Madison | 1,668 | 32.70% | 1,343 | 26.33% | 1,021 | 20.02% | 646 | 12.66% | 243 | 4.76% | 122 | 2.39% | 58 | 1.14% | 325 | 6.37% | 5,101 |
| Mahoning | 8,067 | 39.38% | 3,549 | 17.33% | 3,556 | 17.36% | 3,424 | 16.72% | 1,408 | 6.87% | 366 | 1.79% | 114 | 0.56% | 4,511 | 22.02% | 20,484 |
| Marion | 2,239 | 32.84% | 1,867 | 27.38% | 1,170 | 17.16% | 931 | 13.66% | 426 | 6.25% | 110 | 1.61% | 75 | 1.10% | 372 | 5.46% | 6,818 |
| Medina | 7,078 | 30.15% | 5,891 | 25.09% | 6,097 | 25.97% | 2,606 | 11.10% | 940 | 4.00% | 693 | 2.95% | 170 | 0.72% | 981 | 4.18% | 23,475 |
| Meigs | 900 | 32.76% | 729 | 26.54% | 257 | 9.36% | 269 | 9.79% | 427 | 15.54% | 100 | 3.64% | 65 | 2.37% | 171 | 6.22% | 2,747 |
| Mercer | 2,454 | 30.47% | 2,697 | 33.48% | 1,132 | 14.05% | 1,032 | 12.81% | 355 | 4.41% | 329 | 4.08% | 56 | 0.70% | -243 | -3.02% | 8,055 |
| Miami | 4,217 | 30.51% | 3,816 | 27.61% | 3,232 | 23.38% | 1,575 | 11.39% | 645 | 4.67% | 216 | 1.56% | 121 | 0.88% | 401 | 2.90% | 13,822 |
| Monroe | 506 | 38.39% | 399 | 30.27% | 96 | 7.28% | 96 | 7.28% | 144 | 10.93% | 59 | 4.48% | 18 | 1.37% | 107 | 8.12% | 1,318 |
| Montgomery | 14,713 | 31.96% | 11,557 | 25.11% | 11,318 | 24.59% | 4,833 | 10.50% | 2,346 | 5.10% | 783 | 1.70% | 481 | 1.04% | 3,156 | 6.86% | 46,031 |
| Morgan | 682 | 30.86% | 681 | 30.81% | 340 | 15.38% | 348 | 15.75% | 90 | 4.07 | 27 | 1.22% | 42 | 1.90% | 1 | 0.05% | 2,210 |
| Morrow | 2,021 | 32.61% | 1,872 | 30.20% | 1,010 | 16.30% | 812 | 13.10% | 250 | 4.03% | 161 | 2.60% | 72 | 1.16% | 149 | 2.40% | 6,198 |
| Muskingum | 2,910 | 33.96% | 2,164 | 25.25% | 1,641 | 19.15% | 927 | 10.82% | 698 | 8.15% | 130 | 1.52% | 99 | 1.16% | 746 | 8.71% | 8,569 |
| Noble | 512 | 33.29% | 450 | 29.26% | 179 | 11.64% | 164 | 10.66% | 155 | 10.08% | 64 | 4.16% | 14 | 0.91% | 62 | 4.03% | 1,538 |
| Ottawa | 1,854 | 34.04% | 1,091 | 20.06% | 1,059 | 19.47% | 1,100 | 20.22% | 182 | 3.35% | 115 | 2.11% | 41 | 0.75% | 754 | 13.86% | 5,440 |
| Paulding | 1,215 | 45.57% | 585 | 21.94% | 147 | 5.51% | 252 | 9.45% | 279 | 10.47% | 137 | 5.14% | 51 | 1.91% | 630 | 23.63% | 2,666 |
| Perry | 1,512 | 33.83% | 1,235 | 27.63% | 723 | 16.17% | 771 | 17.25% | 123 | 2.75% | 79 | 1.77% | 27 | 0.60% | 741 | 16.58% | 4,470 |
| Pickaway | 2,385 | 34.34% | 1,916 | 27.59% | 1,350 | 19.44% | 865 | 12.46% | 221 | 3.18% | 167 | 2.40% | 41 | 0.59% | 469 | 6.75% | 6,945 |
| Pike | 748 | 41.21% | 554 | 30.52% | 224 | 12.34% | 191 | 10.52% | 60 | 3.31% | 25 | 1.38% | 13 | 0.72% | 194 | 10.69% | 1,815 |
| Portage | 4,543 | 30.59% | 3,937 | 26.51% | 3,667 | 24.69% | 1,609 | 10.83% | 717 | 4.83% | 287 | 1.93% | 92 | 0.62% | 606 | 4.08% | 14,852 |
| Preble | 1,830 | 30.95% | 1,813 | 30.67% | 1,009 | 17.07% | 786 | 13.29% | 358 | 6.06% | 69 | 1.17% | 47 | 0.79% | 17 | 0.29% | 5,912 |
| Putnam | 1,912 | 36.87% | 1,539 | 29.68% | 597 | 11.51% | 490 | 9.45% | 510 | 9.83% | 100 | 1.93% | 38 | 0.73% | 373 | 7.19% | 5,186 |
| Richland | 4,692 | 30.85% | 5,063 | 33.29% | 2,481 | 16.31% | 1,631 | 10.72% | 596 | 3.92% | 546 | 3.59% | 199 | 1.31% | -371 | -2.44% | 15,208 |
| Ross | 2,325 | 34.98% | 1,916 | 28.83% | 1,153 | 17.35% | 860 | 12.94% | 241 | 3.63% | 101 | 1.52% | 51 | 0.77% | 409 | 6.15% | 6,647 |
| Sandusky | 2,391 | 30.63% | 1,605 | 20.56% | 1,441 | 18.46% | 1,776 | 22.75% | 291 | 3.73% | 231 | 2.96% | 72 | 0.92% | 615 | 7.88% | 7,807 |
| Scioto | 2,740 | 47.28% | 1,319 | 22.76% | 536 | 9.25% | 580 | 10.01% | 499 | 8.61% | 71 | 1.23% | 50 | 0.86% | 1,421 | 24.52% | 5,795 |
| Seneca | 2,072 | 26.83% | 1,800 | 23.31% | 1,359 | 17.260% | 1,598 | 20.69% | 362 | 4.69% | 425 | 5.50% | 107 | 1.39% | 272 | 3.52% | 7,723 |
| Shelby | 1,888 | 28.16% | 2,421 | 36.11% | 1,074 | 16.02% | 862 | 12.86% | 291 | 4.34% | 116 | 1.73% | 53 | 0.79% | -533 | -7.95% | 6,705 |
| Stark | 11,736 | 29.88% | 8,909 | 22.68% | 8,412 | 21.42% | 3,381 | 8.61% | 5,694 | 14.50% | 879 | 2.24% | 265 | 0.67% | 2,827 | 7.20% | 39,276 |
| Summit | 13,188 | 31.26% | 10,369 | 24.58% | 11,459 | 27.17% | 3,780 | 8.96% | 2,315 | 5.49% | 723 | 1.71% | 348 | 0.82% | 2,819 | 6.68% | 42,182 |
| Trumbull | 6,567 | 37.62% | 3,564 | 20.42% | 2,997 | 17.17% | 2,728 | 15.63% | 1,121 | 6.42% | 353 | 2.02% | 126 | 0.72% | 3,003 | 17.20% | 17,456 |
| Tuscarawas | 2,750 | 34.52% | 2,217 | 27.83% | 1,281 | 16.08% | 793 | 9.95% | 672 | 8.44% | 199 | 2.50% | 54 | 0.68% | 533 | 6.69% | 7,966 |
| Union | 2,765 | 34.18% | 1,883 | 23.28% | 1,837 | 22.71% | 978 | 12.09% | 302 | 3.73% | 222 | 2.74% | 102 | 1.26% | 882 | 10.90% | 8,089 |
| Van Wert | 1,452 | 32.72% | 1,264 | 28.49% | 375 | 8.45% | 350 | 7.89% | 720 | 16.23% | 157 | 3.54% | 119 | 2.68% | 188 | 4.24% | 4,437 |
| Vinton | 478 | 38.36% | 346 | 27.95% | 109 | 8.80% | 134 | 10.82% | 121 | 9.77% | 33 | 2.67% | 17 | 1.37% | 132 | 10.66% | 1,238 |
| Warren | 10,322 | 36.78% | 6,513 | 23.21% | 5,947 | 21.19% | 3,015 | 10.74% | 1,624 | 5.79% | 394 | 1.40% | 252 | 0.90% | 3,809 | 13.57% | 28,067 |
| Washington | 2,466 | 36.50% | 1,713 | 25.35% | 876 | 12.96% | 516 | 7.64% | 973 | 14.40% | 144 | 2.13% | 69 | 1.02% | 753 | 11.14% | 6,757 |
| Wayne | 4,037 | 29.39% | 4,046 | 29.46% | 3,045 | 22.17% | 1,086 | 7.91% | 773 | 5.63% | 641 | 4.67% | 107 | 0.78% | -9 | -0.07% | 13,735 |
| Williams | 1,804 | 36.31% | 1,092 | 21.98% | 691 | 13.91% | 759 | 15.28% | 268 | 5.39% | 296 | 5.96% | 58 | 1.17% | 712 | 14.33% | 4,968 |
| Wood | 3,736 | 31.79% | 2,136 | 18.18% | 3,155 | 26.85% | 1,870 | 15.91% | 476 | 4.05% | 301 | 2.56% | 78 | 0.66% | 581 | 4.94% | 11,752 |
| Wyandot | 870 | 29.46% | 763 | 25.84% | 504 | 17.07% | 559 | 18.93% | 127 | 4.30% | 79 | 2.68% | 51 | 1.73% | 107 | 3.62% | 2,953 |

== Democratic primary ==
=== Candidates ===
==== Nominee ====
- Tim Ryan, U.S. representative for Ohio's 13th congressional district (2013–2023) and candidate for President of the United States in 2020

==== Ran in primary ====
- Morgan Harper, former senior advisor at the Consumer Financial Protection Bureau and candidate for Ohio's 3rd congressional district in 2020
- Traci Johnson, activist and tech executive

==== Disqualified ====
- Demar Sheffey, treasurer of the Cuyahoga Soil and Water Conservation District
- Rick Taylor
- LaShondra Tinsley, former case manager for Franklin County Jobs and Family Services

==== Declined ====
- Amy Acton, former director of the Ohio Department of Health
- Joyce Beatty, U.S. representative for Ohio's 3rd congressional district (2013–present) (ran for re-election)
- Kevin Boyce, president of the Franklin County board of commissioners and former Ohio State Treasurer
- Kathleen Clyde, former Portage County commissioner, former state representative, and nominee for Ohio Secretary of State in 2018
- Michael Coleman, former mayor of Columbus
- John Cranley, former mayor of Cincinnati (ran for governor)
- LeBron James, professional basketball player for the Los Angeles Lakers and former player for the Cleveland Cavaliers
- Zach Klein, Columbus city attorney
- Danny O'Connor, Franklin county recorder and nominee for Ohio's 12th congressional district in 2018
- Aftab Pureval, attorney and Hamilton County clerk of courts (elected Mayor of Cincinnati in 2021)
- Alicia Reece, Hamilton County commissioner
- Connie Schultz, former columnist for The Plain Dealer and wife of U.S. Senator Sherrod Brown
- Emilia Sykes, minority leader of the Ohio House of Representatives (ran for the U.S. House in Ohio's 13th congressional district)
- Nina Turner, president of Our Revolution, former state senator, and nominee for Ohio Secretary of State in 2014 (ran for the U.S. House in Ohio's 11th congressional district)
- Nan Whaley, former mayor of Dayton (ran for governor)

=== Endorsements ===
Tim Ryan

U.S. Executive Branch officials

- Hillary Clinton, former U.S. Secretary of State (2009–2013), former First Lady of the United States (1993–2001), and nominee for President of the United States in 2016

U.S. governors

- Ted Strickland, former governor of Ohio (2007–2011), former U.S. Representative for OH-06 (1997–2007), former president of the Center for American Progress Action Fund, and nominee for U.S. Senate in 2016

U.S. Senators

- Sherrod Brown, U.S. Senator from Ohio (2007–2025), former U.S. Representative for OH-13 (1993–2007)

U.S. Representatives

- John Boccieri, former U.S. Representative for OH-16 (2009–2011)
- Zack Space, former U.S. Representative for OH-18 (2007–2011)

State officials

- Yvette McGee Brown, former Associate Justice of the Ohio Supreme Court and 2010 Democratic nominee for Lt. Governor

State senators

- Nickie Antonio, state senator from Ohio's 23rd senatorial district
- Cecil Thomas, state senator from Ohio's 9th senatorial district

State representatives

- Willis Blackshear Jr., state representative from Ohio's 39th district
- Janine Boyd, former state representative from Ohio's 9th district
- Jack Cera, former state representative from Ohio's 96th district
- Jeffrey Crossman, state representative from Ohio's 15th district
- Tavia Galonski, state representative from Ohio's 35th district
- Brigid Kelly, state representative from Ohio's 31st district
- David J. Leland, state representative from Ohio's 22nd district
- Michele Lepore-Hagan, state representative from Ohio's 58th district
- Joe Miller, state representative from Ohio's 56th district
- Allison Russo, state representative from Ohio's 24th district
- Michael Sheehy, state representative from Ohio's 46th district
- Stephen Slesnick, former state representative from Ohio's 49th district
- Kent Smith, state representative from Ohio's 8th district
- Dan Troy, state representative from Ohio's 60th district
- Casey Weinstein, state representative from Ohio's 37th district

Mayors

- Justin Bibb, mayor of Cleveland
- Timothy J. DeGeeter, mayor of Parma
- Dan Horrigan, Mayor of Akron
- Wade Kapszukiewicz, Mayor of Toledo
- Mark Mallory, former mayor of Cincinnati
- Rhine McLin, former mayor of Dayton
- Don Plusquellic, former mayor of Akron

County officials

- Denise Driehaus, Hamilton County Commissioner
- Ilene Shapiro, Executive of Summit County

Individuals

- Fred Guttenberg, activist
- Mojo Nixon, musician

Organizations

- Council for a Livable World
- Democratic Majority for Israel
- Feminist Majority PAC
- Giffords
- Jewish Democratic Council of America
- League of Conservation Voters
- NARAL Pro-Choice America
- Ohio Democratic Party
- Population Connection Action Fund

Labor unions

- International Brotherhood of Electrical Workers
- International Union of Painters and Allied Trades
- Ohio Association of Professional Fire Fighters
- Operative Plasterers' and Cement Masons' International Association

=== Polling ===
| Poll source | Date(s) administered | Sample size | Margin of error | Morgan Harper | Traci Johnson | Tim Ryan | Other | Undecided |
|---|---|---|---|---|---|---|---|---|
| University of Akron | February 17 – March 15, 2022 | – (LV) | – | 18% | – | 43% | 4% | 37% |
| Emerson College | February 25–26, 2022 | 313 (LV) | ± 5.5% | 4% | 9% | 31% | 5% (Note: Tinsley with 5%) | 51% |

Hypothetical polling

| Poll source | Date(s) administered | Sample size | Margin of error | Amy Acton | Tim Ryan | Undecided |
|---|---|---|---|---|---|---|
| Public Policy Polling (D) (Note: This poll was sponsored by 314 Action, which supports Amy Acton) | March 15–16, 2021 | 787 (LV) | ± 3.5% | 37% | 32% | 31% |

=== Results ===
Results by county Ryan: 50–60%; 60–70%; 70–80%; 80–90%

Democratic primary results
| Party | Candidate | Votes | % |
|---|---|---|---|
| Democratic | Tim Ryan | 359,941 | 69.55% |
| Democratic | Morgan Harper | 92,347 | 17.84% |
| Democratic | Traci Johnson | 65,209 | 12.60% |
| Total votes | | 517,497 | 100.0% |

==== By county ====
| | Tim Ryan | | Morgan Harper | | Traci Johnson | | Margin | | Total |
| County | Votes | % | Votes | % | Votes | % | Votes | % | Votes |
|---|---|---|---|---|---|---|---|---|---|
| Adams | 336 | 72.10% | 62 | 13.30% | 68 | 14.59% | 268 | 57.51% | 466 |
| Allen | 1,646 | 64.52% | 436 | 17.09% | 469 | 18.38% | 1,177 | 46.14% | 2,551 |
| Ashland | 893 | 74.11% | 196 | 16.27% | 116 | 9.63% | 697 | 57.84% | 1,205 |
| Ashtabula | 3,112 | 78.41% | 436 | 10.99% | 421 | 10.61% | 2,676 | 67.42% | 3,969 |
| Athens | 2,045 | 62.65% | 837 | 25.64% | 382 | 11.70% | 1,208 | 37.01% | 3,264 |
| Auglaize | 551 | 70.46% | 131 | 16.75% | 100 | 12.79% | 420 | 53.71% | 782 |
| Belmont | 1,713 | 69.10% | 333 | 13.43% | 433 | 17.47% | 1,280 | 51.63% | 2,479 |
| Brown | 597 | 74.16% | 110 | 13.66% | 98 | 12.17% | 487 | 60.50% | 805 |
| Butler | 5,583 | 66.39% | 1,516 | 18.03% | 1,311 | 15.59% | 4,067 | 48.36% | 8,410 |
| Carroll | 619 | 77.57% | 84 | 10.53% | 95 | 11.90% | 524 | 65.66% | 798 |
| Champaign | 692 | 71.71% | 151 | 15.65% | 122 | 12.64% | 441 | 45.70% | 965 |
| Clark | 3,544 | 68.54% | 854 | 16.52% | 773 | 14.95% | 2,690 | 52.02% | 5,171 |
| Clermont | 3,169 | 68.61% | 864 | 18.71% | 586 | 12.69% | 2,305 | 49.90% | 4,619 |
| Clinton | 558 | 64.88% | 171 | 19.88% | 131 | 15.23% | 387 | 45.00% | 860 |
| Columbiana | 2,391 | 85.15% | 235 | 9.83% | 182 | 6.48% | 2,156 | 76.78% | 2,808 |
| Coshocton | 629 | 70.52% | 153 | 17.15% | 110 | 12.33% | 476 | 53.36% | 892 |
| Crawford | 745 | 72.90% | 192 | 18.79% | 85 | 8.32% | 553 | 54.11% | 1,022 |
| Cuyahoga | 62,325 | 70.14% | 4,188 | 6.72% | 12,341 | 13.89% | 49,986 | 56.26% | 88,854 |
| Darke | 765 | 75.82% | 152 | 15.06% | 92 | 9.12% | 613 | 60.75% | 1,009 |
| Defiance | 888 | 76.09% | 163 | 13.97% | 116 | 9.94% | 725 | 62.13% | 1,167 |
| Delaware | 6,252 | 69.43% | 1,886 | 20.94% | 867 | 9.63% | 4,366 | 48.48% | 9,005 |
| Erie | 2,731 | 76.82% | 457 | 12.86% | 367 | 10.32% | 2,274 | 63.97% | 3,555 |
| Fairfield | 3,154 | 67.42% | 936 | 20.01% | 588 | 12.57% | 2,218 | 47.41% | 4,678 |
| Fayette | 356 | 67.81% | 108 | 20.57% | 61 | 11.62% | 248 | 47.24% | 525 |
| Franklin | 42,648 | 59.67% | 21,534 | 30.13% | 7,296 | 10.21% | 21,114 | 29.54% | 71,478 |
| Fulton | 939 | 66.22% | 256 | 18.05% | 223 | 15.73% | 683 | 48.17% | 1,418 |
| Gallia | 411 | 65.76% | 96 | 15.36% | 118 | 18.88% | 293 | 46.88% | 625 |
| Geauga | 2,782 | 79.10% | 452 | 12.85% | 283 | 8.05% | 2,330 | 66.25% | 3,517 |
| Greene | 4,581 | 67.33% | 1,310 | 19.25% | 913 | 13.42% | 3,271 | 48.07% | 6,804 |
| Guernsey | 685 | 70.47% | 153 | 15.74% | 134 | 13.79% | 532 | 54.73% | 972 |
| Hamilton | 23,204 | 59.04% | 7,885 | 20.06% | 8,213 | 20.90% | 14,991 | 38.14% | 39,302 |
| Hancock | 1,284 | 71.29% | 311 | 17.27% | 206 | 11.44% | 973 | 54.03% | 1,801 |
| Hardin | 382 | 67.25% | 129 | 22.71% | 57 | 10.04% | 253 | 44.54% | 568 |
| Harrison | 387 | 68.86% | 77 | 13.70% | 98 | 17.44% | 289 | 51.42% | 562 |
| Henry | 452 | 69.43% | 94 | 14.44% | 105 | 16.13% | 347 | 53.30% | 651 |
| Highland | 452 | 71.52% | 88 | 13.92% | 92 | 14.56% | 360 | 56.96% | 632 |
| Hocking | 738 | 73.87% | 159 | 15.92% | 102 | 10.21% | 579 | 57.96% | 999 |
| Holmes | 330 | 77.83% | 54 | 12.74% | 40 | 9.43% | 276 | 65.09% | 424 |
| Huron | 1,105 | 73.13% | 248 | 16.41% | 158 | 10.46% | 857 | 56.72% | 1,511 |
| Jackson | 322 | 74.88% | 58 | 13.49% | 50 | 11.63% | 264 | 61.40% | 430 |
| Jefferson | 1,878 | 69.38% | 340 | 12.56% | 489 | 18.06% | 1,389 | 51.31% | 2,707 |
| Knox | 1,198 | 74.00% | 270 | 16.68% | 151 | 9.33% | 928 | 57.32% | 1,619 |
| Lake | 8,766 | 76.78% | 1,640 | 14.36% | 1,011 | 8.86% | 7,126 | 62.42% | 11,417 |
| Lawrence | 836 | 58.87% | 294 | 20.70% | 290 | 20.42% | 542 | 38.17% | 1,420 |
| Licking | 4,376 | 69.21% | 1,247 | 19.72% | 700 | 11.07% | 3,129 | 49.49% | 6,323 |
| Logan | 636 | 71.86% | 132 | 14.92% | 117 | 13.22% | 504 | 56.95% | 885 |
| Lorain | 12,806 | 75.36% | 2,367 | 13.93% | 1,820 | 10.71% | 10,439 | 61.43% | 16,993 |
| Lucas | 12,562 | 66.09% | 3,632 | 19.11% | 2,813 | 14.80% | 8,930 | 46.98% | 19,007 |
| Madison | 606 | 66.09% | 198 | 21.59% | 113 | 12.32% | 408 | 44.49% | 917 |
| Mahoning | 13,549 | 84.69% | 1,380 | 8.63% | 1,069 | 6.68% | 12,169 | 76.07% | 15,998 |
| Marion | 1,354 | 69.08% | 325 | 16.58% | 281 | 14.34% | 1,029 | 52.50% | 1,960 |
| Medina | 5,751 | 77.95% | 1,008 | 13.66% | 619 | 8.39% | 4,743 | 64.29% | 7,378 |
| Meigs | 289 | 62.28% | 94 | 20.26% | 81 | 17.46% | 195 | 42.03% | 464 |
| Mercer | 649 | 75.38% | 121 | 14.05% | 91 | 10.57% | 528 | 61.32% | 861 |
| Miami | 1,752 | 72.01% | 385 | 15.82% | 296 | 12.17% | 1,367 | 56.19% | 2,433 |
| Monroe | 417 | 70.80% | 83 | 14.09% | 89 | 15.11% | 328 | 55.69% | 589 |
| Montgomery | 17,587 | 62.58% | 5,096 | 18.13% | 5,419 | 19.28% | 12,168 | 43.30% | 28,102 |
| Morgan | 253 | 70.47% | 64 | 17.83% | 42 | 11.70% | 189 | 52.65% | 359 |
| Morrow | 635 | 68.06% | 178 | 19.08% | 120 | 12.86% | 457 | 48.98% | 933 |
| Muskingum | 1,373 | 70.77% | 337 | 17.37% | 230 | 11.86% | 1,036 | 53.40% | 1,940 |
| Noble | 260 | 68.78% | 53 | 14.02% | 65 | 17.20% | 195 | 51.59% | 378 |
| Ottawa | 1,513 | 70.63% | 339 | 15.83% | 290 | 13.54% | 1,174 | 54.81% | 2,142 |
| Paulding | 333 | 67.55% | 78 | 15.82% | 82 | 16.63% | 251 | 50.91% | 493 |
| Perry | 799 | 73.24% | 178 | 16.32% | 114 | 10.45% | 621 | 56.92% | 1,091 |
| Pickaway | 985 | 69.56% | 270 | 19.07% | 161 | 11.37% | 715 | 50.49% | 1,416 |
| Pike | 441 | 75.51% | 85 | 14.55% | 58 | 9.93% | 356 | 60.96% | 584 |
| Portage | 6,919 | 82.38% | 879 | 10.47% | 601 | 7.16% | 6,049 | 72.02% | 8,399 |
| Preble | 609 | 73.11% | 130 | 15.61% | 94 | 11.28% | 479 | 57.50% | 833 |
| Putnam | 452 | 71.41% | 102 | 16.11% | 79 | 12.48% | 350 | 55.29% | 633 |
| Richland | 2,541 | 69.27% | 604 | 16.47% | 523 | 14.26% | 1,937 | 52.81% | 3,668 |
| Ross | 1,461 | 71.69% | 371 | 18.20% | 206 | 10.11% | 1,090 | 53.48% | 2,038 |
| Sandusky | 1,573 | 70.00% | 345 | 15.35% | 329 | 14.64% | 1,228 | 54.65% | 2,247 |
| Scioto | 1,097 | 66.48% | 260 | 15.76% | 293 | 17.76% | 804 | 48.73% | 1,650 |
| Seneca | 1,245 | 71.22% | 302 | 17.28% | 201 | 11.50% | 943 | 53.95% | 1,748 |
| Shelby | 661 | 75.80% | 128 | 14.68% | 83 | 9.52% | 533 | 61.12% | 872 |
| Stark | 12,006 | 76.18% | 2,030 | 12.88% | 1,725 | 10.94% | 9,976 | 63.30% | 15,761 |
| Summit | 24,275 | 79.17% | 3,788 | 12.35% | 2,597 | 8.47% | 20,487 | 66.82% | 30,660 |
| Trumbull | 13,682 | 83.12% | 1,527 | 9.28% | 1,251 | 7.60% | 12,155 | 73.85% | 16,460 |
| Tuscarawas | 2,010 | 76.83% | 325 | 12.42% | 281 | 10.73% | 1,685 | 64.41% | 2,616 |
| Union | 1,008 | 64.33% | 377 | 24.06% | 182 | 11.61% | 631 | 40.27% | 1,567 |
| Van Wert | 406 | 62.85% | 118 | 18.27% | 122 | 18.89% | 284 | 43.96% | 646 |
| Vinton | 200 | 69.20% | 56 | 19.38% | 33 | 11.42% | 144 | 49.83% | 289 |
| Warren | 4,097 | 69.11% | 1,215 | 20.50% | 616 | 10.39% | 2,882 | 48.62% | 5,928 |
| Washington | 1,259 | 65.17% | 341 | 17.65% | 332 | 17.18% | 918 | 47.52% | 1,932 |
| Wayne | 2,407 | 74.98% | 489 | 15.23% | 314 | 9.78% | 1,918 | 59.75% | 3,210 |
| Williams | 576 | 71.64% | 130 | 16.17% | 98 | 12.19% | 446 | 55.47% | 804 |
| Wood | 3,489 | 69.17% | 983 | 19.49% | 572 | 11.34% | 2,506 | 49.68% | 5,044 |
| Wyandot | 368 | 69.43% | 98 | 18.49% | 64 | 12.08% | 270 | 50.94% | 530 |

== Third-party and independent candidates ==
=== Candidates ===
==== Declared ====
- John Cheng (write-in)
- Matthew R. Esh (write-in)
- Stephen Faris, candidate for the U.S. Senate in 2018 (write-in)
- Shane Hoffman (write-in)
- Lashondra Tinsley (write-in)

==== Disqualified ====
- Eric Meiring (Independent)
- Sam Ronan, United States Air Force veteran, candidate for Ohio's 1st congressional district in 2018, and candidate for chair of the Democratic National Committee in 2017 (Independent)
- Shannon Marie Taylor (Libertarian)

== General election ==
Ohio had trended Republican in recent years, voting for Donald Trump by eight points in both the 2016 and 2020 presidential elections. As such, most analysts expected that this seat would easily remain in Republican hands. However, aggregate polling on the run-up to the election indicated a competitive race, and most outlets considered it to be "lean Republican". In the end, JD Vance held the open seat for the Republicans.

The funding in the race was described as "lopsided" in favor of J.D. Vance who struggled to raise money on his own but was massively helped by national groups who poured in more than $30 million worth of advertising. Tim Ryan, the Democratic nominee, was the more prolific fundraiser but national Democratic groups provided comparatively little help on the airwaves and advertisements to keep up with the Republican campaign. Ryan called it "David against Goliath."

=== Predictions ===
| Source | Ranking | As of |
|---|---|---|
| The Cook Political Report | Lean R | October 4, 2022 |
| Inside Elections | Lean R | October 7, 2022 |
| Sabato's Crystal Ball | Lean R | August 31, 2022 |
| Politico | Lean R | September 5, 2022 |
| RCP | Lean R | September 20, 2022 |
| Fox News | Lean R | September 20, 2022 |
| DDHQ | Likely R | November 5, 2022 |
| 538 | Likely R | October 7, 2022 |
| The Economist | Likely R | November 5, 2022 |

=== Debates ===
2022 United States Senate general election in Ohio debates
| No. | Date | Host | Moderator | Link | Republican | Democratic |
| Key: P Participant A Absent N Non-invitee I Invitee W Withdrawn | | | | | | |
| Key: P Participant A Absent N Non-invitee I Invitee W Withdrawn | | | | | JD Vance | Tim Ryan |
|---|---|---|---|---|---|---|
| 1 | Oct. 10, 2022 | Fox 8 | Colleen Marshall; Joe Toohey | YouTube | P | P |
| 2 | Oct. 17, 2022 | 21 WFMJ | Lindsay McCoy; Bertram de Souza; Derek Steyer | YouTube | P | P |

=== Post-primary endorsements ===
JD Vance (R)

U.S. Senators

- Tom Cotton, U.S. Senator from Arkansas (2015–present)
- Ted Cruz, U.S. Senator from Texas (2013–present)
- Joni Ernst, U.S. Senator from Iowa (2015–present)
- Rob Portman, U.S. Senator from Ohio (2011–2023)
- Tim Scott, U.S. Senator form South Carolina (2013–present)

U.S. Representatives

- Mike Carey, U.S. Representative for OH-15 (2021–present)
- Warren Davidson, U.S. Representative for OH-08 (2016–present)
- Tulsi Gabbard, former U.S. Representative from HI-02 (2013–2021) and former Vice Chair of the Democratic National Committee (2013–2016) (Independent)
- Bill Johnson, U.S. Representative for OH-06 (2011–2024)
- Jim Jordan, U.S. Representative for OH-04 (2007–present)
- Mike Turner, U.S. Representative for OH-10 (2003–present)
- Brad Wenstrup, U.S. Representative for OH-02 (2013–2025)

State officials

- Ron DeSantis, Governor of Florida (2019–present)
- Mike DeWine, Governor of Ohio (2019–present)
- Keith Faber, Auditor of Ohio (2019–present)
- Jon Husted, Lieutenant Governor of Ohio (2019–2025)
- Josh Mandel, former Ohio state treasurer (2011–2019), nominee for U.S. Senate in Ohio 2012, candidate for U.S. Senate in Ohio in 2018 and in 2022
- Robert Sprague, Treasurer of Ohio (2019–present)
- Jane Timken, former chair of the Ohio Republican Party (2017–2021) and candidate for U.S. Senate in Ohio in 2022
- Dave Yost, Attorney General of Ohio (2019–present)

State legislators

- Matt Dolan, state senator from Ohio's 24th senatorial district (2017–2024) and candidate for U.S. Senate in Ohio 2022
- Marilyn Reid, state representative from Ohio's 78th House of Representatives district (1993–1998)

Individuals

- Mike Gibbons, candidate for U.S. senate in Ohio in 2018 and in 2022
- Max Miller, former aide to Donald Trump and Republican nominee for OH-07 in 2022
- Dusty Rhodes, Hamilton County Auditor (Democratic)

Newspapers and other media

- The Marietta Times (Local newspaper from the city of Marietta, Ohio)

Organizations

- Campaign for Working Families
- National Federation of Independent Business
- National Rifle Association
- Ohio Farm Bureau
- Ohio Fraternal Order of Police
- Ohio Republican Party
- Republican Jewish Coalition
- Susan B. Anthony List
Tim Ryan (D)

Executive Branch officials

- John Bridgeland, former Director of the U.S. Domestic Policy Council (2001–2002) (Republican)

U.S. Senators

- Joe Manchin, U.S. Senator from West Virginia (2010–2025), former governor of West Virginia (2005–2010)

U.S. Representatives

- Joyce Beatty, U.S. Representative for OH-3 (2013–present)
- Liz Cheney, U.S. Representative for Wyoming's at-large congressional district (2017–2023) (Republican)
- Marcy Kaptur, U.S. Representative for OH-9 (1983–present)
- ~~Alexandria Ocasio-Cortez, U.S. Representative for NY-14 (2019–present)~~ (endorsement rejected by Ryan)

State officials

- Jim Petro, former Ohio Attorney General and Ohio State Auditor (Republican)

State representatives

- Rocky Saxbe, former state representative from Ohio's 75th district (Republican)
- Emilia Sykes, state representative from Ohio's 34th district and nominee for U.S. House in 2022

County officials

- Phil Heimlich, former Hamilton County Commissioner and Cincinnati City Councillor (Republican)

Individuals

- Dave Matthews, singer

Newspapers and other media

- The Blade
- The Columbus Dispatch
- The Plain Dealer

Organizations

- Human Rights Campaign
- Sierra Club

Labor unions

- AFL–CIO
- CWA District 4
- National Education Association
- United Auto Workers
- United Mine Workers of America

=== Polling ===
Aggregate polls

| Source of poll aggregation | Dates administered | Dates updated | JD Vance (R) | Tim Ryan (D) | Undecided (Note: Calculated by taking the difference of 100% and all other candidates combined.) | Margin |
|---|---|---|---|---|---|---|
| Real Clear Politics | October 30 – November 5, 2022 | November 7, 2022 | 51.8% | 43.8% | 4.4% | Vance +8.0 |
| FiveThirtyEight | October 17 – November 7, 2022 | November 7, 2022 | 50.9% | 44.7% | 4.4% | Vance +6.2 |
| 270towin | November 4–7, 2022 | November 7, 2022 | 52.0% | 44.2% | 3.8% | Vance +7.8 |
| Average | | | 51.6% | 44.2% | 4.2% | Vance +7.4 |

Graphical summary

| Poll source | Date(s) administered | Sample size | Margin of error | JD Vance (R) | Tim Ryan (D) | Other | Undecided |
|---|---|---|---|---|---|---|---|
| Civiqs | November 4–7, 2022 | 716 (LV) | ± 4.1% | 51% | 46% | 2% (Note: "Someone else" with 2%) | 2% |
| Research Co. | November 4–6, 2022 | 450 (LV) | ± 4.6% | 52% | 44% | – | 4% |
| Targoz Market Research | November 2–6, 2022 | 505 (LV) | ± 4.3% | 52% | 45% | 3% (Note: "All others" with 3%) | – |
| The Trafalgar Group (R) | November 3–5, 2022 | 1,123 (LV) | ± 2.9% | 54% | 44% | – | 3% |
| Data for Progress (D) | November 2–5, 2022 | 1,413 (LV) | ± 3.0% | 55% | 45% | – | – |
| Cygnal (R) | November 1–3, 2022 | 1,498 (LV) | ± 2.5% | 49% | 43% | – | 8% |
| Remington Research Group (R) | November 1–2, 2022 | 1,125 (LV) | ± 2.8% | 48% | 43% | – | 9% |
| Emerson College | October 30 – November 1, 2022 | 1,000 (LV) | ± 3.0% | 51% | 43% | 2% (Note: "Someone else" with 2%) | 4% |
| Emerson College | October 30 – November 1, 2022 | 1,000 (LV) | ± 3.0% | 53% | 44% | 3% (Note: "Someone else" with 3%) | – |
| Cygnal (R) | October 29 – November 1, 2022 | 1,520 (LV) | ± 2.5% | 49% | 44% | – | 7% |
| Cygnal (R) | October 26–30, 2022 | 1,510 (LV) | ± 2.5% | 48% | 44% | – | 8% |
| Cygnal (R) | October 24–28, 2022 | 1,776 (LV) | ± 2.3% | 48% | 43% | – | 9% |
| Cygnal (R) | October 22–26, 2022 | 1,817 (LV) | ± 2.3% | 49% | 44% | – | 8% |
| Cygnal (R) | October 20–24, 2022 | 1,886 (LV) | ± 2.3% | 48% | 44% | – | 8% |
| Baldwin Wallace University | October 20–23, 2022 | 1,068 (LV) | ± 3.5% | 46% | 50% | – | 4% |
| Cygnal (R) | October 18–22, 2022 | 1,547 (LV) | ± 2.5% | 47% | 43% | – | 10% |
| Marist College | October 17–20, 2022 | 1,141 (RV) | ± 3.9% | 46% | 45% | 1% (Note: "Another party's candidate" with 1%) | 8% |
| Marist College | October 17–20, 2022 | 942 (LV) | ± 4.3% | 47% | 47% | 1% (Note: "Another party's candidate" with 1%) | 5% |
| Cygnal (R) | October 16–20, 2022 | 1,540 (LV) | ± 2.5% | 47% | 44% | – | 9% |
| Siena College | October 14–19, 2022 | 644 (LV) | ± 5.1% | 46% | 46% | 3% (Note: "Not going to vote" with 2%; "Another candidate" with 1%) | 6% |
| Cygnal (R) | October 14–18, 2022 | 1,438 (LV) | ± 2.6% | 47% | 43% | – | 10% |
| Ohio Northern University/Lucid | October 11–15, 2022 | 668 (LV) | ± 3.8% | 41% | 43% | 1% (Note: "Other" with 1%) | 15% |
| Suffolk University | October 11–15, 2022 | 500 (LV) | ± 4.4% | 47% | 45% | 1% (Note: "Someone else" with 1%) | 6% |
| The Trafalgar Group (R) | October 10–12, 2022 | 1,081 (LV) | ± 2.9% | 47% | 44% | – | 9% |
| Data for Progress (D) | October 7–12, 2022 | 1,016 (LV) | ± 3.0% | 49% | 46% | – | 5% |
| Cygnal (R) (Note: This poll was sponsored by American Greatness) | October 6–8, 2022 | 640 (LV) | – | 46% | 44% | – | 9% |
| Emerson College | October 6–7, 2022 | 1,000 (LV) | ± 3.0% | 46% | 45% | 1% (Note: "Someone else" with 1%) | 9% |
| Kurt Jetta (D) (Note: This poll was sponsored by Center Street PAC, which opposes Vance) | October 2–3, 2022 | 950 (RV) | ± 3.5% | 35% | 43% | – | 22% |
| Kurt Jetta (D) | October 2–3, 2022 | 528 (LV) | ± 3.5% | 38% | 49% | – | 14% |
| Siena College | September 18–22, 2022 | 642 (LV) | ± 4.4% | 43% | 46% | 2% (Note: "Another candidate" with 1%; "Not going to vote" with 1%) | 9% |
| Baldwin Wallace University | September 12–15, 2022 | 855 (LV) | ± 4.1% | 45% | 48% | – | 7% |
| Marist College | September 12–15, 2022 | 1,200 (RV) | ± 3.6% | 46% | 45% | – | 9% |
| Marist College | September 12–15, 2022 | 1,009 (LV) | ± 3.9% | 48% | 47% | – | 5% |
| Emerson College | September 10–13, 2022 | 1000 (LV) | ± 3.0% | 44% | 40% | 3% | 13% |
| Civiqs | September 10–13, 2022 | 780 (LV) | ± 4% | 48% | 45% | 3% | 4% |
| Fallon Research | September 6–11, 2022 | 600 (RV) | ± 4.3% | 43% | 46% | 1% | 10% |
| Suffolk University | September 5–7, 2022 | 500 (LV) | ± 4.4% | 46% | 47% | 1% | 6% |
| Echelon Insights | August 31 – September 7, 2022 | 831 (LV) | ± 4.3% | 39% | 45% | – | 15% |
| Impact Research (D) (Note: This poll was sponsored by Ryan's campaign) | August 17–23, 2022 | 800 (LV) | ± 3.5% | 47% | 50% | – | 3% |
| The Trafalgar Group (R) | August 16–19, 2022 | 1,087 (LV) | ± 2.9% | 50% | 45% | – | 6% |
| Emerson College | August 15–16, 2022 | 925 (LV) | ± 3.2% | 45% | 42% | 4% | 10% |
| Kurt Jetta (D) | August 1–3, 2022 | 1,180 (A) | ± 2.9% | 32% | 42% | – | 26% |
| Kurt Jetta (D) | August 1–3, 2022 | 974 (RV) | ± 3.1% | 33% | 44% | – | 23% |
| Kurt Jetta (D) | August 1–3, 2022 | 516 (LV) | ± 4.3% | 38% | 49% | – | 12% |
| Impact Research (D) | July 21–28, 2022 | 800 (LV) | ± 3.5% | 45% | 48% | – | 7% |
| PEM Management Corporation (R) (Note: This poll was conducted for John Bolton Super PAC) | July 22–24, 2022 | 300 (LV) | ± 5.7% | 38% | 44% | 3% | 15% |
| Grow Progress (D) (Note: This poll was sponsored by Innovation Ohio) | July 5–10, 2022 | 2,032 (RV) | ± 3.0% | 41% | 46% | – | 13% |
| Kurt Jetta (D) | July 1–3, 2022 | 1,199 (A) | ± 2.8% | 36% | 41% | – | 23% |
| Kurt Jetta (D) | July 1–3, 2022 | 989 (RV) | ± 3.1% | 37% | 44% | – | 20% |
| Kurt Jetta (D) | July 1–3, 2022 | 528 (LV) | ± 4.3% | 43% | 46% | – | 11% |
| Impact Research (D) | June 27–30, 2022 | 816 (LV) | ± 3.4% | 46% | 48% | – | 6% |
| Grow Progress (D) | May 30 – June 3, 2022 | 2,018 (RV) | ± 3.0% | 41% | 44% | – | 15% |
| Suffolk University | May 22–24, 2022 | 500 (LV) | ± 4.4% | 42% | 39% | 2% | 17% |
| Momentive (D) | May 13, 2022 | 1,174 (A) | ± 2.9% | 37% | 37% | – | 25% |
| Momentive (D) | May 13, 2022 | 989 (RV) | ± 3.1% | 40% | 39% | – | 21% |
| Momentive (D) | May 13, 2022 | 528 (LV) | ± 4.3% | 48% | 43% | – | 9% |
| Grow Progress (D) | April 25–29, 2022 | 2,014 (RV) | ± 2.5% | 41% | 43% | – | 15% |
| Redfield & Wilton Strategies | August 20–24, 2021 | 1,200 (RV) | ± 2.8% | 33% | 36% | 3% | 24% |
| Redfield & Wilton Strategies | August 20–24, 2021 | 1,160 (LV) | ± 2.9% | 36% | 37% | 3% | 23% |
| Public Policy Polling (D) | March 18–19, 2021 | 700 (V) | ± 3.7% | 39% | 37% | – | 24% |

Hypothetical polling

Josh Mandel vs. Amy Acton

| Poll source | Date(s) administered | Sample size | Margin of error | Josh Mandel (R) | Amy Acton (D) | Undecided |
|---|---|---|---|---|---|---|
| Public Policy Polling (D) | March 18–19, 2021 | 700 (V) | ± 3.7% | 41% | 42% | 17% |

Josh Mandel vs. Tim Ryan

| Poll source | Date(s) administered | Sample size | Margin of error | Josh Mandel (R) | Tim Ryan (D) | Other | Undecided |
|---|---|---|---|---|---|---|---|
| Redfield & Wilton Strategies | August 20–24, 2021 | 1,200 (RV) | ± 2.8% | 38% | 36% | 4% | 18% |
| Redfield & Wilton Strategies | August 20–24, 2021 | 1,160 (LV) | ± 2.9% | 41% | 37% | 4% | 17% |
| Public Policy Polling (D) | March 18–19, 2021 | 700 (V) | ± 3.7% | 42% | 38% | – | 20% |

Jane Timken vs. Amy Acton

| Poll source | Date(s) administered | Sample size | Margin of error | Jane Timken (R) | Amy Acton (D) | Undecided |
|---|---|---|---|---|---|---|
| Public Policy Polling (D) | March 18–19, 2021 | 700 (V) | ± 3.7% | 40% | 40% | 20% |

Jane Timken vs. Tim Ryan

| Poll source | Date(s) administered | Sample size | Margin of error | Jane Timken (R) | Tim Ryan (D) | Other | Undecided |
|---|---|---|---|---|---|---|---|
| Redfield & Wilton Strategies | August 20–24, 2021 | 1,200 (RV) | ± 2.8% | 33% | 36% | 4% | 23% |
| Redfield & Wilton Strategies | August 20–24, 2021 | 1,160 (LV) | ± 2.9% | 36% | 38% | 4% | 22% |
| Public Policy Polling (D) | March 18–19, 2021 | 700 (V) | ± 3.7% | 41% | 38% | – | 21% |

JD Vance vs. Amy Acton

| Poll source | Date(s) administered | Sample size | Margin of error | JD Vance (R) | Amy Acton (D) | Undecided |
|---|---|---|---|---|---|---|
| Public Policy Polling (D) | March 18–19, 2021 | 700 (V) | ± 3.7% | 38% | 40% | 22% |

=== Results ===
{{switcher

|

State Senate district results Vance: 50–60% 60–70% 70–80% Ryan: 50–60% 60–70% 70–80% 80–90%

|State Senate district results |{{switcher |[[File:2022 Ohio United States Senate election by State House District fixed.svg|thumb|210px|State House district results
Vance: 50–60% 60–70% 70–80% 80–90%
Ryan: 50–60% 60–70% 70–80% 80–90% ]] }} }}

2022 United States Senate election in Ohio
| Party | Candidate | Votes | % | ±% |
|---|---|---|---|---|
| Republican | JD Vance | 2,192,114 | 53.03% | −5.00% |
| Democratic | Tim Ryan | 1,939,489 | 46.92% | +9.76% |
| Write-in | | 1,739 | 0.04% | N/A |
| Total votes | | 4,133,342 | 100.0% | N/A |
| Republican hold | | | | |

==== By county ====
| County | JD Vance Republican | | Tim Ryan Democratic | | Various candidates Other parties | | Margin | | Total |
| County | # | % | # | % | # | % | # | % | Total |
|---|---|---|---|---|---|---|---|---|---|
| Adams | 6,749 | 77.34% | 1,976 | 22.64% | 1 | 0.01% | 4,773 | 54.70% | 8,726 |
| Allen | 23,229 | 71.02% | 9,428 | 28.83% | 49 | 0.15% | 13,801 | 42.19% | 32,706 |
| Ashland | 13,366 | 72.61% | 5,034 | 27.35% | 9 | 0.05% | 8,332 | 45.26% | 18,409 |
| Ashtabula | 18,277 | 59.14% | 12,561 | 40.64% | 69 | 0.22% | 5,716 | 18.50% | 30,907 |
| Athens | 7,482 | 39.18% | 11,578 | 60.62% | 38 | 0.20% | -4,096 | -21.44% | 19,098 |
| Auglaize | 15,022 | 80.37% | 3,641 | 19.48% | 28 | 0.15% | 11,381 | 60.89% | 18,691 |
| Belmont | 15,169 | 67.25% | 7,356 | 32.61% | 31 | 0.14% | 7,813 | 34.64% | 22,556 |
| Brown | 10,832 | 76.62% | 3,300 | 23.34% | 5 | 0.04% | 7,532 | 53.28% | 14,137 |
| Butler | 79,240 | 61.88% | 48,777 | 38.09% | 35 | 0.03% | 30,463 | 23.79% | 128,052 |
| Carroll | 7,372 | 72.70% | 2,743 | 27.05% | 25 | 0.25% | 4,629 | 45.65% | 10,140 |
| Champaign | 10,253 | 71.03% | 4,095 | 28.37% | 87 | 0.60% | 6,158 | 42.66% | 14,435 |
| Clark | 27,131 | 61.10% | 17,141 | 38.60% | 130 | 0.30% | 9,990 | 22.50% | 44,402 |
| Clermont | 52,888 | 65.97% | 27,084 | 33.78% | 194 | 0.24% | 25,804 | 32.19% | 80,166 |
| Clinton | 10,515 | 74.59% | 3,562 | 25.27% | 21 | 0.15% | 6,953 | 49.32% | 14,098 |
| Columbiana | 24,829 | 69.77% | 10,705 | 30.08% | 51 | 0.14% | 14,124 | 39.69% | 35,585 |
| Coshocton | 8,021 | 70.97% | 3,255 | 28.80% | 26 | 0.23% | 4,766 | 42.17% | 11,302 |
| Crawford | 10,855 | 73.18% | 3,948 | 26.61% | 31 | 0.21% | 6,907 | 46.57% | 14,834 |
| Cuyahoga | 131,427 | 32.12% | 277,039 | 67.70% | 750 | 0.18% | -145,612 | -35.58% | 409,216 |
| Darke | 15,977 | 80.76% | 3,773 | 19.07% | 33 | 0.17% | 12,204 | 61.69% | 19,783 |
| Defiance | 8,821 | 66.03% | 4,513 | 33.78% | 25 | 0.19% | 4,308 | 32.25% | 13,359 |
| Delaware | 52,540 | 53.13% | 46,319 | 46.84% | 27 | 0.03% | 6,221 | 6.29% | 98,886 |
| Erie | 15,287 | 52.93% | 13,541 | 46.89% | 51 | 0.18% | 1,746 | 6.04% | 28,879 |
| Fairfield | 35,926 | 60.63% | 23,305 | 39.33% | 27 | 0.05% | 12,621 | 21.30% | 59,258 |
| Fayette | 6,287 | 74.76% | 2,102 | 24.99% | 21 | 0.25% | 4,185 | 49.77% | 8,410 |
| Franklin | 143,263 | 33.64% | 281,505 | 66.10% | 1,134 | 0.27% | -138,242 | -32.46% | 425,902 |
| Fulton | 10,906 | 67.18% | 5,299 | 32.64% | 28 | 0.17% | 5,607 | 34.54% | 16,233 |
| Gallia | 6,993 | 76.68% | 2,116 | 23.20% | 11 | 0.12% | 4,877 | 53.48% | 9,120 |
| Geauga | 25,332 | 59.24% | 17,348 | 40.57% | 81 | 0.19% | 7,984 | 18.67% | 42,761 |
| Greene | 39,385 | 59.51% | 26,751 | 40.42% | 43 | 0.06% | 12,634 | 19.09% | 66,179 |
| Guernsey | 8,678 | 71.18% | 3,505 | 28.75% | 9 | 0.07% | 5,173 | 42.43% | 12,192 |
| Hamilton | 127,792 | 42.25% | 174,511 | 57.69% | 183 | 0.06% | -46,719 | -15.44% | 302,486 |
| Hancock | 18,357 | 67.77% | 8,717 | 32.18% | 14 | 0.05% | 9,640 | 35.59% | 27,088 |
| Hardin | 6,521 | 72.48% | 2,471 | 27.46% | 5 | 0.06% | 4,050 | 45.02% | 8,997 |
| Harrison | 3,721 | 71.78% | 1,451 | 27.99% | 12 | 0.23% | 2,270 | 43.79% | 5,184 |
| Henry | 7,102 | 68.94% | 3,190 | 30.96% | 10 | 0.10% | 3,912 | 37.98% | 10,302 |
| Highland | 10,185 | 77.68% | 2,925 | 22.31% | 2 | 0.02% | 7,260 | 55.37% | 13,112 |
| Hocking | 6,353 | 66.80% | 3,139 | 33.00% | 19 | 0.20% | 3,214 | 33.80% | 9,511 |
| Holmes | 7,056 | 81.82% | 1,564 | 18.14% | 4 | 0.05% | 5,492 | 63.68% | 8,624 |
| Huron | 12,398 | 67.24% | 5,998 | 32.53% | 42 | 0.23% | 6,400 | 34.71% | 18,438 |
| Jackson | 6,599 | 74.17% | 2,285 | 25.68% | 13 | 0.15% | 4,314 | 48.49% | 8,897 |
| Jefferson | 14,970 | 65.32% | 7,914 | 34.53% | 34 | 0.15% | 7,056 | 30.79% | 22,918 |
| Knox | 16,104 | 69.70% | 6,969 | 30.16% | 31 | 0.13% | 9,135 | 39.54% | 23,104 |
| Lake | 50,890 | 54.02% | 43,166 | 45.82% | 158 | 0.17% | 7,724 | 8.20% | 94,214 |
| Lawrence | 12,697 | 72.51% | 4,793 | 27.37% | 21 | 0.12% | 7,904 | 45.14% | 17,511 |
| Licking | 41,566 | 62.51% | 24,774 | 37.26% | 154 | 0.23% | 16,792 | 25.25% | 66,494 |
| Logan | 12,551 | 76.15% | 3,898 | 23.65% | 32 | 0.19% | 8,653 | 52.50% | 16,481 |
| Lorain | 54,488 | 48.70% | 57,191 | 51.11% | 209 | 0.19% | -2,703 | -2.41% | 111,888 |
| Lucas | 53,009 | 40.09% | 78,727 | 59.54% | 480 | 0.36% | -25,718 | -19.45% | 132,216 |
| Madison | 9,763 | 69.01% | 4,350 | 30.75% | 35 | 0.25% | 5,413 | 38.26% | 14,148 |
| Mahoning | 44,397 | 51.64% | 41,421 | 48.18% | 151 | 0.18% | 2,976 | 3.46% | 85,969 |
| Marion | 12,760 | 66.65% | 6,342 | 33.12% | 44 | 0.23% | 6,418 | 33.53% | 19,146 |
| Medina | 45,960 | 58.86% | 31,979 | 40.95% | 145 | 0.19% | 13,981 | 17.91% | 78,084 |
| Meigs | 5,589 | 74.84% | 1,875 | 25.11% | 4 | 0.05% | 3,714 | 49.73% | 7,468 |
| Mercer | 14,390 | 80.84% | 3,389 | 19.04% | 21 | 0.12% | 11,001 | 61.80% | 17,800 |
| Miami | 30,114 | 71.35% | 11,993 | 28.42% | 99 | 0.23% | 18,121 | 42.93% | 42,206 |
| Monroe | 3,479 | 71.48% | 1,378 | 28.31% | 10 | 0.21% | 2,101 | 43.17% | 4,867 |
| Montgomery | 91,382 | 49.04% | 94,512 | 50.72% | 460 | 0.25% | -3,130 | -1.68% | 186,354 |
| Morgan | 3,494 | 72.52% | 1,317 | 27.33% | 7 | 0.15% | 2,177 | 45.19% | 4,818 |
| Morrow | 9,985 | 75.04% | 3,303 | 24.82% | 18 | 0.14% | 6,682 | 50.22% | 13,306 |
| Muskingum | 18,664 | 68.28% | 8,638 | 31.60% | 34 | 0.12% | 10,026 | 36.68% | 27,336 |
| Noble | 3,519 | 76.30% | 1,083 | 23.48% | 10 | 0.22% | 2,436 | 52.82% | 4,612 |
| Ottawa | 10,653 | 57.80% | 7,750 | 42.05% | 27 | 0.15% | 2,903 | 15.75% | 18,430 |
| Paulding | 4,873 | 75.31% | 1,587 | 24.52% | 11 | 0.17% | 3,286 | 50.79% | 6,471 |
| Perry | 8,557 | 71.70% | 3,342 | 28.00% | 36 | 0.30% | 5,215 | 43.70% | 11,935 |
| Pickaway | 13,859 | 70.72% | 5,696 | 29.07% | 41 | 0.21% | 8,163 | 41.65% | 19,596 |
| Pike | 5,488 | 70.21% | 2,327 | 29.77% | 2 | 0.03% | 3,161 | 40.44% | 7,817 |
| Portage | 32,274 | 53.29% | 28,175 | 46.52% | 114 | 0.19% | 4,099 | 6.77% | 60,563 |
| Preble | 12,156 | 77.22% | 3,533 | 22.44% | 54 | 0.34% | 8,623 | 54.78% | 15,743 |
| Putnam | 12,332 | 82.09% | 2,667 | 17.75% | 24 | 0.16% | 9,665 | 64.34% | 15,023 |
| Richland | 28,812 | 69.04% | 12,904 | 30.92% | 16 | 0.04% | 15,908 | 38.12% | 41,732 |
| Ross | 14,728 | 65.06% | 7,858 | 34.71% | 52 | 0.23% | 6,870 | 30.35% | 22,638 |
| Sandusky | 13,076 | 61.27% | 8,177 | 38.31% | 90 | 0.42% | 4,899 | 22.96% | 21,343 |
| Scioto | 14,656 | 69.56% | 6,411 | 30.43% | 4 | 0.02% | 8,245 | 39.13% | 21,071 |
| Seneca | 11,618 | 64.58% | 6,322 | 35.14% | 51 | 0.28% | 5,296 | 29.44% | 17,991 |
| Shelby | 14,512 | 80.32% | 3,509 | 19.42% | 47 | 0.26% | 11,003 | 60.90% | 18,068 |
| Stark | 77,287 | 57.87% | 56,215 | 42.09% | 44 | 0.03% | 21,072 | 15.78% | 133,546 |
| Summit | 86,724 | 43.31% | 113,112 | 56.49% | 415 | 0.21% | -26,388 | -13.18% | 200,251 |
| Trumbull | 39,082 | 53.46% | 33,890 | 46.36% | 132 | 0.18% | 5,192 | 7.10% | 73,104 |
| Tuscarawas | 20,072 | 66.01% | 10,267 | 33.77% | 67 | 0.22% | 9,805 | 32.24% | 30,406 |
| Union | 16,320 | 64.16% | 9,075 | 35.67% | 43 | 0.17% | 7,245 | 28.49% | 25,438 |
| Van Wert | 7,959 | 78.49% | 2,176 | 21.46% | 5 | 0.05% | 5,783 | 57.03% | 10,140 |
| Vinton | 2,986 | 74.28% | 1,028 | 25.57% | 6 | 0.15% | 1,958 | 48.71% | 4,020 |
| Warren | 65,370 | 64.38% | 35,970 | 35.43% | 196 | 0.19% | 29,400 | 28.95% | 101,536 |
| Washington | 15,812 | 69.50% | 6,938 | 30.50% | 1 | 0.00% | 8,874 | 39.00% | 22,751 |
| Wayne | 25,599 | 66.58% | 12,832 | 33.37% | 19 | 0.05% | 12,767 | 33.21% | 38,450 |
| Williams | 8,935 | 69.57% | 3,903 | 30.39% | 5 | 0.04% | 5,032 | 39.18% | 12,843 |
| Wood | 24,854 | 51.62% | 23,269 | 48.33% | 25 | 0.05% | 1,585 | 3.29% | 48,148 |
| Wyandot | 5,811 | 71.93% | 2,255 | 27.91% | 13 | 0.16% | 3,556 | 44.02% | 8,079 |
| Totals | 2,192,312 | 52.97% | 1,939,751 | 46.86% | 7,071 | 0.17% | 252,561 | 6.11% | 4,139,134 |

Counties that flipped from Republican to Democratic

- Hamilton (largest municipality: Cincinnati)
- Lorain (largest municipality: Lorain)
- Montgomery (largest municipality: Dayton)
- Summit (largest municipality: Akron)

==== By congressional district ====
Vance won ten of 15 congressional districts.

| District | Vance | Ryan | Representative |
|---|---|---|---|
| 1st | 46% | 54% | Steve Chabot (117th Congress) |
| 1st | 46% | 54% | Greg Landsman (118th Congress) |
| 2nd | 70% | 30% | Brad Wenstrup |
| 3rd | 28% | 72% | Joyce Beatty |
| 4th | 67% | 33% | Jim Jordan |
| 5th | 61% | 39% | Bob Latta |
| 6th | 62% | 38% | Bill Johnson |
| 7th | 52% | 48% | Bob Gibbs / Anthony Gonzalez (117th Congress) |
| 7th | 52% | 48% | Max Miller (118th Congress) |
| 8th | 61% | 39% | Warren Davidson |
| 9th | 49.8% | 50.2% | Marcy Kaptur |
| 10th | 52% | 48% | Mike Turner |
| 11th | 20% | 80% | Shontel Brown |
| 12th | 63% | 37% | Troy Balderson |
| 13th | 47% | 53% | Tim Ryan (117th Congress) |
| 13th | 47% | 53% | Emilia Sykes (118th Congress) |
| 14th | 55% | 45% | David Joyce |
| 15th | 53% | 47% | Mike Carey |

== Voter demographics ==
According to exit polls by the National Election Pool, Vance won the election (53% to 47%), winning majority of white voters (59% to 40%), while Ryan received majorities of the Black vote (86% to 13%) and, to smaller extent, the Latino vote (59% to 41%).

National election pool
| Demographic subgroup | Ryan | Vance | No answer | % of voters |
Gender
| Men | 41 | 58 | 1 | 52 |
| Women | 53 | 47 | N/A | 48 |
Age
| 18–24 years old | 59 | 41 | N/A | 4 |
| 25–29 years old | 59 | 40 | 1 | 6 |
| 30–39 years old | 54 | 45 | 1 | 12 |
| 40–49 years old | 47 | 53 | 1 | 16 |
| 50–64 years old | 42 | 58 | N/A | 31 |
| 65 and older | 44 | 55 | 1 | 31 |
Race
| White | 40 | 59 | 1 | 83 |
| Black | 86 | 13 | 1 | 12 |
| Latino | 59 | 41 | N/A | 2 |
Race by gender
| White men | 35 | 64 | 1 | 44 |
| White women | 46 | 53 | 1 | 39 |
| Black men | 83 | 15 | 2 | 6 |
| Black women | 88 | 11 | N/A | 6 |
Education
| No college degree | 43 | 57 | N/A | 57 |
| College graduate | 52 | 48 | N/A | 43 |
Educational attainment
| High school or less | 36 | 64 | N/A | 17 |
| Some college education | 46 | 53 | 1 | 25 |
| Associate degree | 44 | 55 | 1 | 15 |
| Bachelor's degree | 49 | 51 | N/A | 25 |
| Advanced degree | 57 | 43 | N/A | 17 |
Party ID
| Democrats | 97 | 3 | N/A | 30 |
| Republicans | 8 | 92 | N/A | 41 |
| Independents | 50 | 49 | 1 | 29 |
Ideology
| Liberals | 95 | 4 | 1 | 20 |
| Moderates | 56 | 43 | 1 | 42 |
| Conservatives | 11 | 89 | N/A | 38 |
Marital status
| Married | 47 | 53 | N/A | 64 |
| Unmarried | 54 | 45 | 1 | 36 |
Gender by marital status
| Married men | 38 | 62 | N/A | 31 |
| Married women | 55 | 45 | N/A | 33 |
| Unmarried men | 45 | 53 | 2 | 18 |
| Unmarried women | 63 | 37 | N/A | 17 |
Union household
| Yes | 56 | 43 | 1 | 21 |
| No | 44 | 55 | 1 | 79 |
First-time midterm election voter
| Yes | 48 | 52 | N/A | 9 |
| No | 47 | 53 | N/A | 91 |
Most important issue facing the country
| Crime | 41 | 59 | N/A | 8 |
| Inflation | 25 | 75 | N/A | 35 |
| Gun policy | 54 | 43 | 3 | 16 |
| Immigration | 12 | 88 | N/A | 9 |
| Abortion | 81 | 19 | N/A | 26 |
Area type
| Urban | 58 | 42 | N/A | 33 |
| Suburban | 41 | 58 | 1 | 51 |
| Rural | 42 | 57 | 1 | 16 |
Region
| Cleveland Area | 68 | 31 | 1 | 12 |
| North | 44 | 55 | 1 | 20 |
| West | 35 | 65 | N/A | 16 |
| Columbus Area | 60 | 40 | N/A | 19 |
| Cincinnati/Dayton Area | 41 | 58 | 1 | 20 |
| Ohio Valley | 35 | 65 | N/A | 13 |
Source: CBS News

== See also ==
- 2022 United States Senate elections
- 2022 Ohio elections

== Notes ==
Partisan clients
