= Morgan Harper (lawyer) =

American community organizer (born 1983)

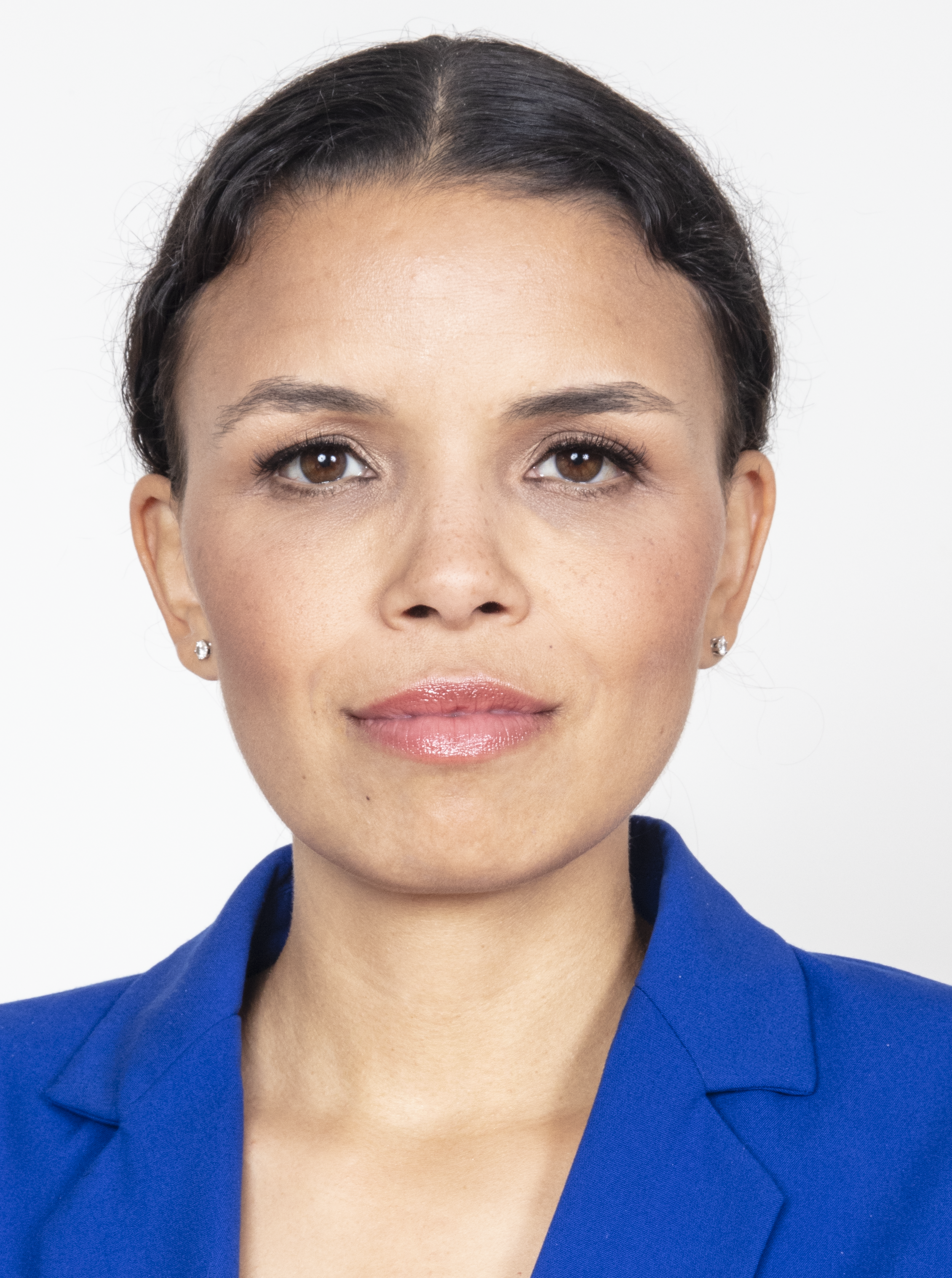

Personal details
- Born: July 1, 1983 (age 43) Columbus, Ohio, U.S.
- Party: Democratic
- Education: Tufts University (BA); Stanford University (JD); Princeton University (MPA)
- Website: Official website

Morgan Harper (born July 1, 1983) is an American attorney, community organizer, and political candidate. After working as a senior advisor at the Consumer Financial Protection Bureau, in 2020 she campaigned against incumbent Joyce Beatty to represent Ohio's 3rd congressional district, which includes Columbus, in the United States House of Representatives. Also in 2020, she founded the non-profit Columbus Stand Up. In 2022 she ran for the United States Senate to succeed Rob Portman. She lost in the Democratic Primary to congressman Tim Ryan 69-17%.

== Early life and education ==
Born in Columbus, Ohio on July 1, 1983, Harper lived in a foster home for nine months before being adopted by a public school teacher. Raised in Columbus, she earned a Bachelor of Arts degree at Tufts University and a Juris Doctor degree from Stanford Law School. She later earned a Master of Public Affairs from the Woodrow Wilson School of Public and International Affairs at Princeton University.

== Career ==
After law school, Harper first served as a law clerk to Judge Algenon L. Marbley on the U.S. District Court for the Southern District of Ohio and then worked at the law firm Cravath, Swaine & Moore LLP in New York. Harper would go on to work for three years at the Consumer Financial Protection Bureau, serving as a senior advisor to director Richard Cordray under President Obama. Afterwards, she served as vice president of knowledge management and strategy for the Local Initiatives Support Corporation.

In 2020, Harper founded Columbus Stand Up. After organizing volunteers to drive voters to polls, in 2021 Columbus Stand Up began donating masks and transporting Columbus residents to get COVID-19 vaccines.

=== 2020 congressional campaign ===
On July 1, 2019, she challenged Democratic incumbent Joyce Beatty to represent Ohio's 3rd congressional district, which includes most of Columbus. Endorsed by Justice Democrats in August 2019, she was endorsed by the Sunrise Movement in December 2019 and the Working Families Party in February 2020. Harper raised $323,000 during the campaign's first quarter, with her platform focused on "universal child care, tuition-free public college, Medicare for All, reparations, affordable housing, and a Green New Deal." On April 29, 2020, it was announced that Beatty had won the primary, with Harper earning 32% of 66,000 votes.

=== 2022 U.S. Senate election ===
In August 2021, Harper declared her candidacy for 2022 United States Senate election in Ohio. Harper faced Congressman Tim Ryan and Traci Johnson in the Democratic primary. She lost to Ryan in the Democratic Primary 69-17%.

== Personal life ==
Harper lives in Columbus, Ohio.

== Electoral history ==
2020 United States House of Representatives Democratic primary results in Ohio
Party	Candidate	Votes	%
Democratic	Joyce Beatty (incumbent)	44,995	68.1
Democratic	Morgan Harper	21,057	31.9
Total votes		66,052	100.0

2022 United States Senate Democratic primary results in Ohio
Party	Candidate	Votes	%
Democratic	Tim Ryan	359,941	69.55%
Democratic	Morgan Harper	92,347	17.84%
Democratic	Traci Johnson	65,209	12.60%
Total votes		517,497	100.0%

== See also ==
- 2020 United States House of Representatives elections in Ohio
