= Tim Ryan (Ohio politician) =

American politician (born 1973)

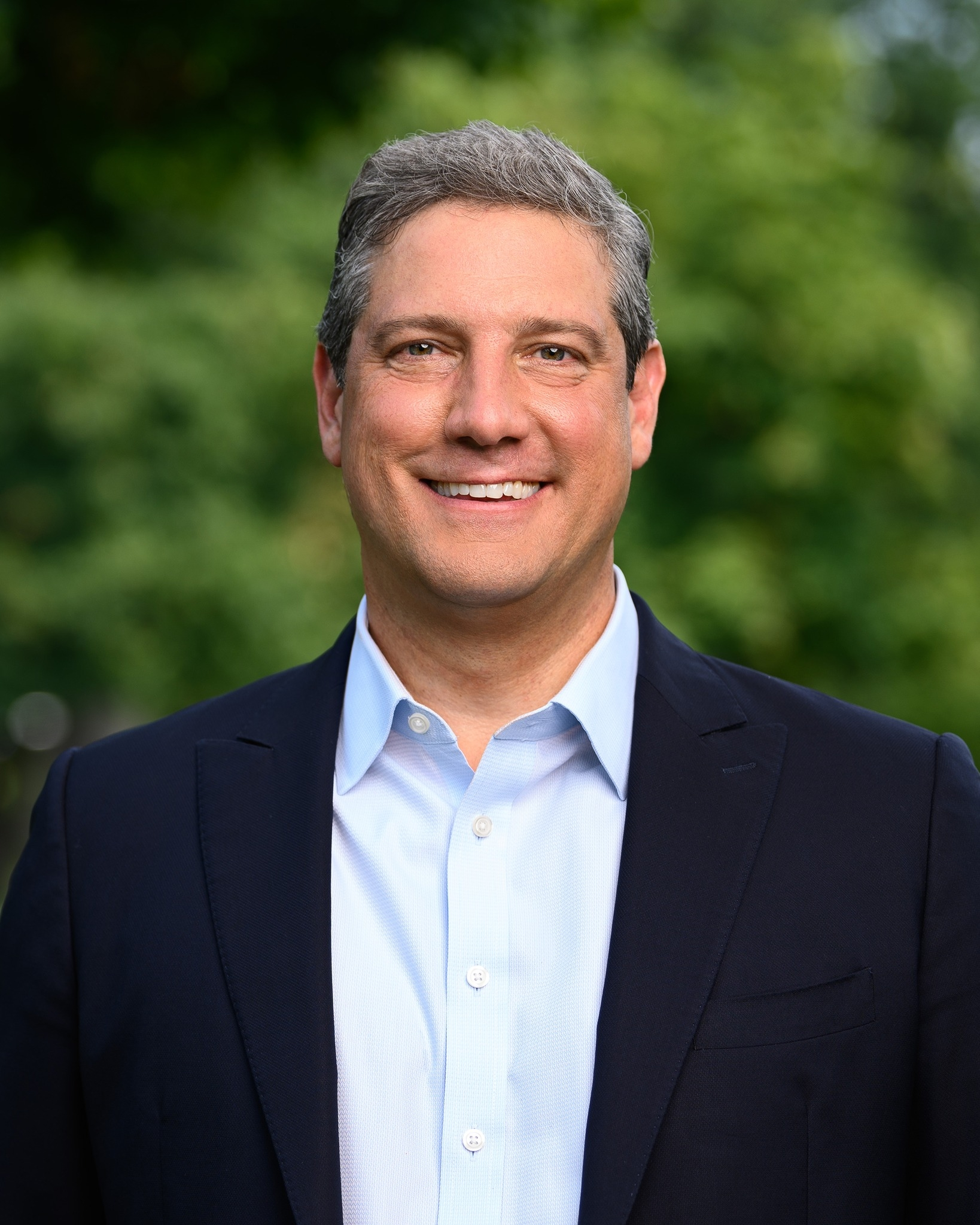
- Official portrait, 2022

Member of the U.S. House of Representatives from Ohio
- In office January 3, 2003 – January 3, 2023
- Preceded by: James Traficant
- Succeeded by: Emilia Sykes
- Constituency: 17th district (2003–2013); 13th district (2013–2023)

Member of the Ohio Senate from the 32nd district
- In office January 3, 2001 – December 19, 2002
- Preceded by: Anthony Latell
- Succeeded by: Marc Dann

Personal details
- Born: Timothy John Ryan; July 16, 1973 (age 53) Niles, Ohio, U.S.
- Party: Democratic
- Spouse: Andrea Zetts (m. 2013)
- Children: 3 (2 stepchildren)
- Education: Bowling Green State University (BA); University of New Hampshire (JD)
- Ryan's voice Ryan questions J. Thomas Manger on reforms to the United States Capitol Police. Recorded March 30, 2022

Timothy John Ryan (born July 16, 1973) is an American politician who represented Ohio in the United States House of Representatives from 2003 to 2023. A member of the Democratic Party, he represented Ohio's 13th congressional district from 2013 to 2023, having previously represented Ohio's 17th congressional district from 2003 to 2013. Ryan's district encompassed a large swath of northeastern Ohio, including Youngstown and parts of Akron. He was the Democratic nominee in the 2022 United States Senate election in Ohio.

Born in Niles, Ohio, Ryan worked as an aide to U.S. representative Jim Traficant after studying political science at Bowling Green State University, and earned a Juris Doctor from the University of New Hampshire School of Law. He served in the Ohio Senate from 2001 to 2002 before winning the election to succeed Traficant.

In November 2016, Ryan launched an unsuccessful challenge to unseat Nancy Pelosi as party leader of the House Democrats. He was also an early candidate for the 2020 Democratic presidential nomination before ending his campaign in 2019 to run for reelection to the House. In 2021, Ryan announced his candidacy for the senate seat of retiring incumbent Rob Portman and won the Democratic nomination with 70% of the vote, but lost to Republican nominee and future Vice President JD Vance in the general election.

== Early life and career ==
Timothy John Ryan was born on July 16, 1973, in Niles, Ohio, to Rochelle Maria (Rizzi) and Allen Leroy Ryan. He is of Irish and Italian ancestry. Ryan's parents divorced when he was seven years old, and he was raised by his mother. Ryan graduated from John F. Kennedy High School in Warren, where he played football as a quarterback and coached junior high basketball. He was recruited to play football at Youngstown State University, but a knee injury ended his playing career, and he transferred to Bowling Green State University.

Ryan received a Bachelor of Arts degree in political science from Bowling Green in 1995 and was a member of Delta Tau Delta fraternity. After college, he joined the staff of Ohio congressman Jim Traficant. In 2000, Ryan earned a Juris Doctor degree from Franklin Pierce Law Center in Concord, New Hampshire. From 2000 to 2002 he served half a term in the Ohio State Senate.

== U.S. House of Representatives ==
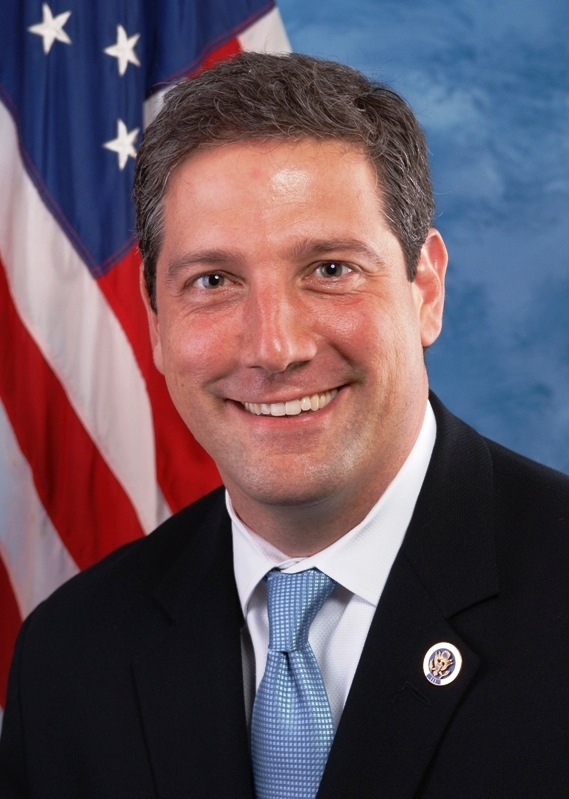
Ryan during the 111th United States Congress

=== Elections ===
After Jim Traficant was convicted on criminal charges in 2002, Ryan declared his candidacy for the 17th district. As the result of redistricting following the 2000 census, the 17th, which had long been based in Youngstown, had been pushed west and included much of Portage County and part of Akron. Before the redistricting, all of Akron had been part of the 14th district, represented by eight-term Democrat Tom Sawyer. The 14th had been eliminated in 2000; most of it was drawn into the 13th district of fellow Democrat Sherrod Brown, but Sawyer's home was drawn into the 17th. Ryan was initially seen as an underdog in a six-way Democratic primary that included Sawyer.

In the 2002 Democratic primary, Ryan defeated Sawyer, who was seen as insufficiently labor-friendly in the newly drawn district. In the November 2002 general election, he faced Republican insurance commissioner Ann Womer Benjamin as well as Traficant, who ran as an independent from his prison cell. Ryan won with 51% of the vote to Benjamin's 37%. When he took office in January 2003, he was the youngest Democrat in the House, at 29 years of age. He was reelected to represent the 17th district five times, only once facing a contest nearly as close as his first. In 2010, he was held to 53% of the vote; Traficant, running as an independent, took 16%.

From redistricting in 2012, until giving up to seat to run for the United States Senate he served five terms as the U.S. representative for the 13th district.

=== Tenure ===
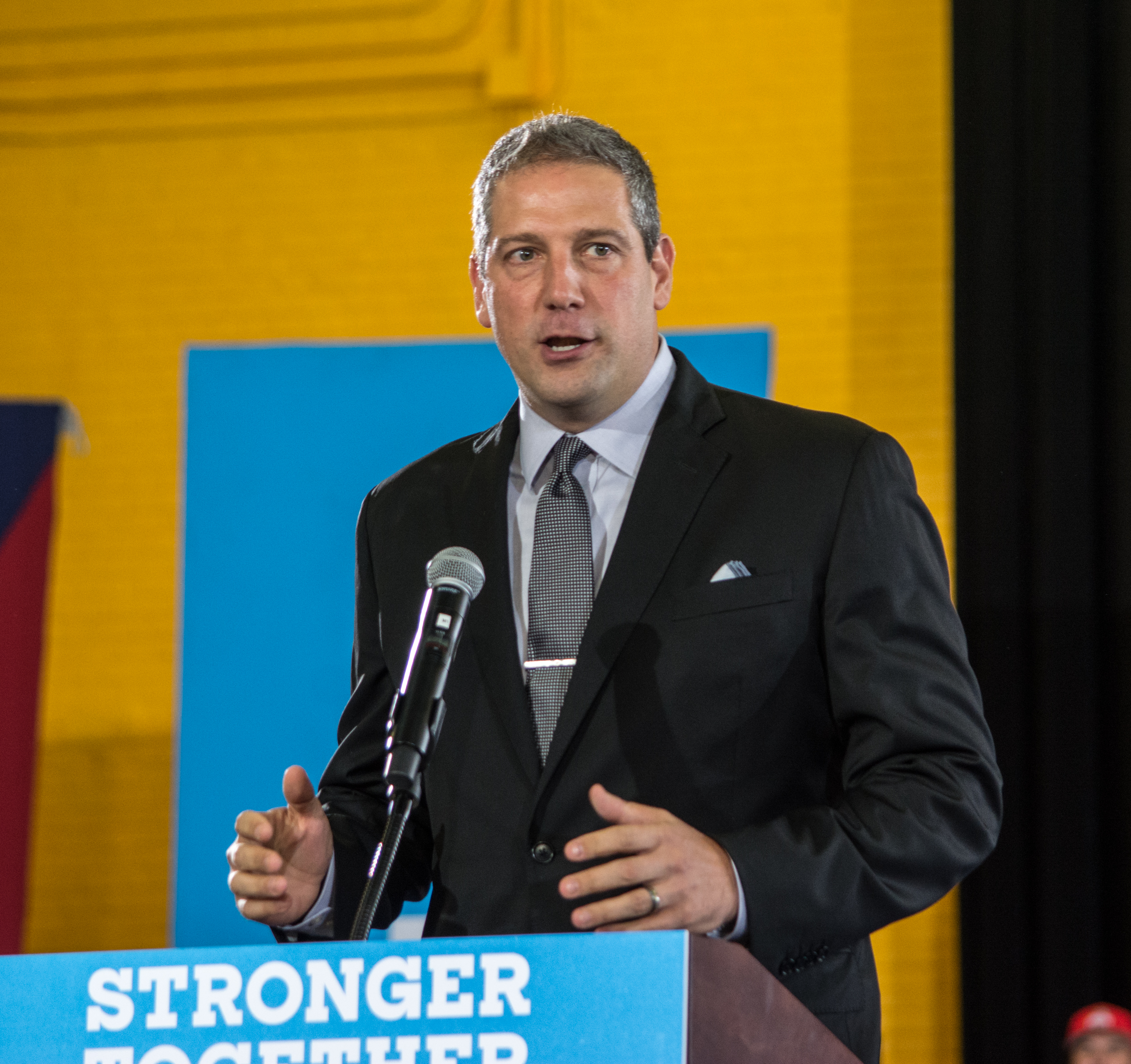
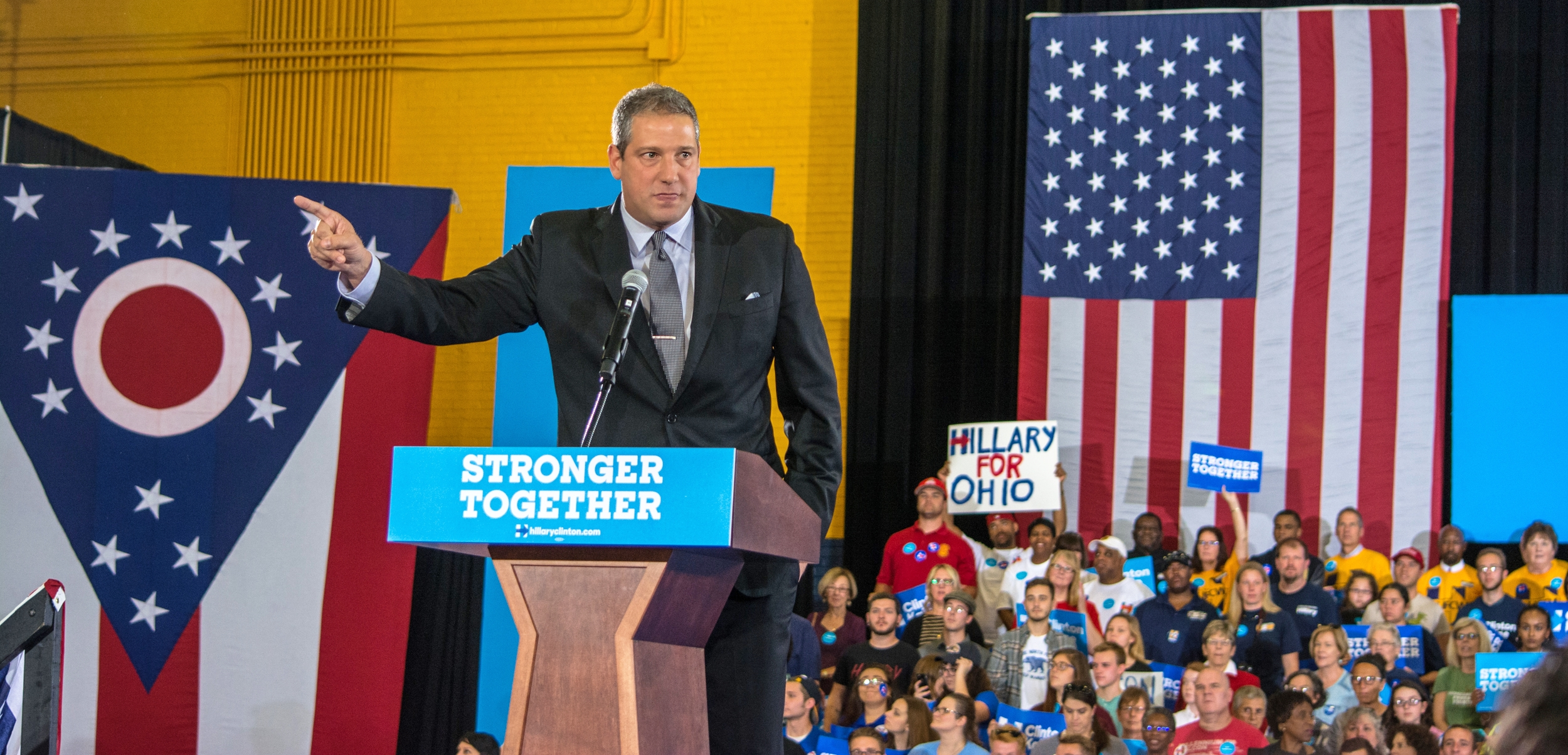
Ryan speaking at a rally for Hillary Clinton, October 2016

In his first year in office in 2003, Ryan was one of seven members of Congress to vote against the Do-Not-Call Implementation Act, and one of eight to oppose ratification of the Federal Trade Commission's establishment of a National Do Not Call Registry.

In 2010, Ryan voted for the Stupak Amendment restricting federal funding for abortions, but in January 2015, he announced that having "gained a deeper understanding of the complexities and emotions that accompany the difficult decisions [about whether to end a pregnancy]" over his time in public office, he had reversed his position on abortion and now identified as pro-choice.

In 2010, Ryan introduced the Currency Reform for Fair Trade Act, which sought punitive trade tariffs on countries, notably China, that were engaging in currency manipulation. It passed the House overwhelmingly but never made it to the floor in the Senate. In an October 2010 interview with conservative magazine Human Events, Ryan said tax increases on small businesses were necessary "because we have huge deficits. We gotta shore up Social Security. We gotta shrink our deficits."

Ryan initiated a bid to replace Pelosi as House minority leader on November 17, 2016, prompted by colleagues after the 2016 presidential election. After Pelosi agreed to give more leadership opportunities to junior members, she defeated Ryan by a vote of 134–63 on November 30.

Ryan supported the Iran nuclear deal to prevent Iran from acquiring weapons of mass destruction. In April 2016, he tweeted, "I was in Jerusalem a few weeks ago & saw firsthand the dangerous threat Israelis face. Israel has the right to defend itself from terror."

Around 2018, Ryan helped Adi Othman, an undocumented immigrant in Youngstown, Ohio, remain in the United States. Othman had lived in the United States for nearly 40 years, ran several businesses in Youngstown, was married to a US citizen and had four US-born children. Ryan repeatedly presented a bill to Congress whereby Othman would be granted a more thorough review of his case to stay in the United States (Othman disputed a verdict by immigration officials on a matter that affected his legal status); the fact that the bill was in motion meant that Othman could temporarily stay. Othman was deported from the United States in February 2018 after President Donald Trump directed U.S. Immigration and Customs Enforcement (ICE) to increase the number of arrests and deportations of undocumented immigrants. Ryan condemned the deportation, saying, "To watch these families get ripped apart is the most heart-breaking thing any American citizen could ever see ... Because you are for these families, it doesn't mean you are not for a secure border."

Ryan chaired the Subcommittee on the Legislative Branch, which investigated the January 6 United States Capitol attack. In May 2021, Ryan angrily chastised Senate Republicans for blocking a January 6 commission to investigate the January 6 United States Capitol attack.

=== Committee assignments ===
- Committee on Appropriations
  - Subcommittee on the Legislative Branch (chair)
  - Subcommittee on Defense
  - Subcommittee on Military Construction, Veterans Affairs, and Related Agencies

=== Caucus memberships ===
- Co-chair of the Congressional Addiction, Treatment and Recovery Caucus
- Co-chair of the Congressional Manufacturing Caucus
- United States Congressional International Conservation Caucus
- Sportsmen's Caucus
- Congressional Arts Caucus
- Ohio River Basin Congressional Caucus
- Afterschool Caucuses
- Medicare for All Caucus
- Blue Collar Caucus
- House Pro-Choice Caucus
- Congressional Taiwan Caucus

== 2020 presidential campaign ==
Tim Ryan for America
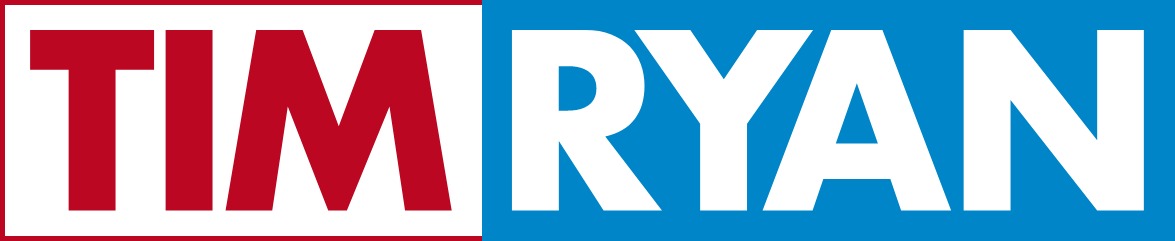
- Campaign: 2020 United States presidential election (Democratic primaries)
- Candidate: Tim Ryan; Representative from Ohio's 17th congressional district (2002–2013) and Ohio's 13th congressional district (2013–2023)
- Affiliation: Democratic Party
- Announced: April 4, 2019
- Suspended: October 24, 2019
- Headquarters: Gaithersburg, Maryland
- Receipts: US$1,341,246.39 (12/31/2019)
- Slogan: Our Future Is Now

Website
- Campaign website

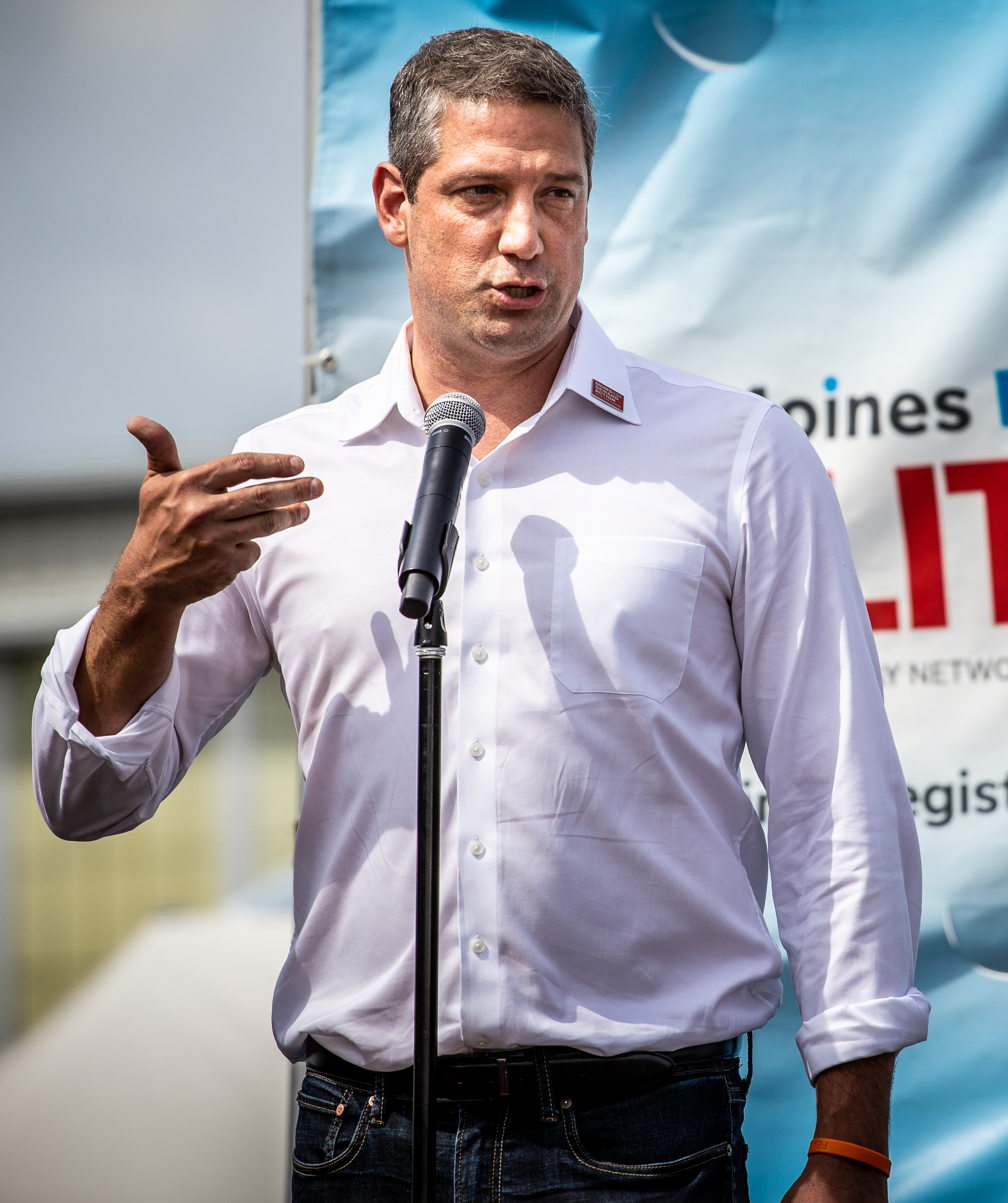
Ryan campaigning at the 2019 Iowa State Fair

After the 2018 midterms, Ryan was seen as a possible candidate for the 2020 presidential election. In February and March 2019, he traveled to early primary states such as Iowa and New Hampshire. Ryan's 2020 presidential campaign officially began on April 4, 2019, when he announced his candidacy in the Democratic primaries. He also announced that he would seek the nomination on The View. After qualifying for only two debates and continuously polling below 1% nationwide, Ryan formally withdrew from the race on October 24, 2019. He was reelected to the House of Representatives in 2020.

== 2022 U.S. Senate election and afterwards ==
Final results by county in 2022: JD Vance: 80–90%; 70–80%; 60–70%; 50–60%; Tim Ryan: 60–70%; 50–60%

On January 25, 2021, Republican U.S. senator from Ohio Rob Portman announced that he would not seek reelection in 2022. Ryan filed paperwork to run to replace him. On April 26, 2021, Ryan announced his candidacy for U.S. Senate in a video posted via Twitter.

Ryan defeated Morgan Harper and Traci Johnson in the Democratic primary and faced Republican nominee JD Vance in the general election. In the pursuit of center-right voters, Ryan's campaign sought to portray him as a moderate or "independent", highlighting that he voted for some of former President Donald Trump's policies. Ryan also criticized and distanced himself from fellow Democrats, including President Joe Biden, suggesting that Biden should not seek reelection in 2024, and progressive Representative Alexandria Ocasio Cortez, whose endorsement he seemingly rejected.

A Ryan campaign ad, repeatedly blaming China for the loss of American jobs, attracted criticism from politicians and Asian American groups, who said it encouraged Sinophobia and anti-Asian hate. Representative Grace Meng called on Ryan to stop airing it.

On November 8, 2022, Ryan lost to JD Vance in the general election by 6 points.

On July 2, 2024, after the first 2024 Presidential debate between President Joe Biden and Donald Trump, Tim Ryan said that he had lost confidence in Biden's ability to defeat Trump and called on him to be replaced by Vice President Kamala Harris as the Democratic presidential nominee.

== Political views ==
Ryan is a moderate Democrat.

He has advocated a return to Bill Clintonian business-friendly policies minus NAFTA after the 2024 United States elections. He has defended and lobbied for the natural gas and cryptocurrency industry which are opposed by some Democrats, saying that natural gas has displaced coal in Ohio and employs unionized workers, and crypto has been helpful for small businesses, especially those in minority communities. He is strongly opposed to the $600 million in bonds for the Cleveland Browns stadium in Brook Park that Republicans added to the Ohio House budget, calling it "outrageous."

Ryan is an advocate of economic protectionism, unionization, and steps to reduce income inequality. A critic of the North American Free Trade Agreement (NAFTA), he has criticized George W. Bush's and Barack Obama's trade policies.

Ryan is a strong critic of student loan forgiveness and has said that it sends a "wrong message".

Ryan has supported tougher measures against China and its ruling party. He has accused the nation of currency manipulation and outsourcing American manufacturing jobs.

Ryan described himself as a pro-life Catholic when first running for Congress in 2002. By 2015, he had shifted his stance and became pro-choice, saying that his thinking had changed. He argued, "no federal or state law banning abortion can honestly and fairly take into account the various circumstances that make each decision unique".

== Publications ==
In March 2012, Hay House published Ryan's A Mindful Nation, a book about the practice of mindfulness in both private and public life. He writes in his introduction:

If more citizens can reduce stress and increase performance—even if only by a little—they will be healthier and more resilient. They will be better equipped to face the challenges of daily life, and to arrive at creative solutions to the challenges facing our nation.

In October 2014, the same publisher published Ryan's The Real Food Revolution.

== Personal life ==
In 2013, Ryan married Andrea Zetts, his second wife; they live in Dublin, Ohio, but lived in eastern Ohio during his tenure in Congress and his senate campaign. Ryan is the stepfather of Zetts's two children from a previous relationship, and the two welcomed a son in 2014.

Ryan is Catholic and spent 12 years in Catholic schools such as the John F. Kennedy Catholic School in Warren, Ohio, and named Catholic social teaching as a major influence on his life and political thought. He also emphasized the religiosity of his family, crediting his "devout grandfather, other churchgoing relatives, social-justice-minded religious sisters" as his inspiration. Ryan also expressed his deep respect for Pope Francis, writing: "I'm on the Pope Francis Twitter feed and I make sure I'm always staying connected to what he's saying on public issues". Ryan styled himself as a "Roosevelt-style Catholic Democrat" while campaigning, emphasising both his working-class background and Irish-Italian Catholic roots, and is seen by political pundits as a "more traditional Catholic willing to swim in traditional political waters".

== Electoral history ==
2020 Ryan: 45–50% 55–60% Hagan: 45–50% 55–60%

Ohio's 17th congressional district: Results 2002–2010
Year	Democrat	Votes	Pct	Republican	Votes	Pct	Other	Party	Votes	Pct
2002	Timothy J. Ryan	94,441	51%	Ann Womer Benjamin	62,188	34%	James A. Traficant, Jr.	Independent	28,045	15%
2004	Timothy J. Ryan	212,800	77%	Frank V. Cusimano	62,871	23%				
2006	Timothy J. Ryan	170,369	80%	Don Manning II	41,925	20%				
2008	Timothy J. Ryan	217,556	78%	Duane Grassell	60,760	22%				
2010	Timothy J. Ryan	102,758	54%	Jim Graham	57,352	30%	James A. Traficant, Jr.	Independent	30,556	16%

Ohio's 13th congressional district: Results 2012–2020
Year	Democrat	Votes	Pct	Republican	Votes	Pct
2012	Timothy J. Ryan	227,076	72%	Marisha Agana	86,269	28%
2014	Timothy J. Ryan	120,230	69%	Thomas Pekarek	55,233	31%
2016	Timothy J. Ryan	208,610	68%	Richard Morckel	99,377	32%
2018	Timothy J. Ryan	149,271	61%	Chris DePizzo	96,225	39%
2020	Timothy J. Ryan	173,631	53%	Christina Hagan	148,648	45%

U.S. Senate
Year	Republican	Votes	Pct	Democrat	Votes	Pct
2022	JD Vance	2,192,114	53%	Timothy J. Ryan	1,939,489	47%

== See also ==
- List of United States representatives from Ohio
- 30 Something Working Group

U.S. House of Representatives
Preceded by Jim Traficant	Member of the U.S. House of Representatives from Ohio's 17th congressional district 2003–2013	Constituency abolished
Preceded by Betty Sutton	Member of the U.S. House of Representatives from Ohio's 13th congressional district 2013–2023	Succeeded by Emilia Sykes
Party political offices
Preceded by Ted Strickland	Democratic nominee for U.S. Senator from Ohio (Class 3); 2022	Succeeded by Sherrod Brown
U.S. order of precedence (ceremonial)
Preceded by Ed Whitfield as Former U.S. Representative	Order of precedence of the United States as Former U.S. Representative	Succeeded by Richard Baker as Former U.S. Representative
