= MedFlight =

American non-profit transport organization

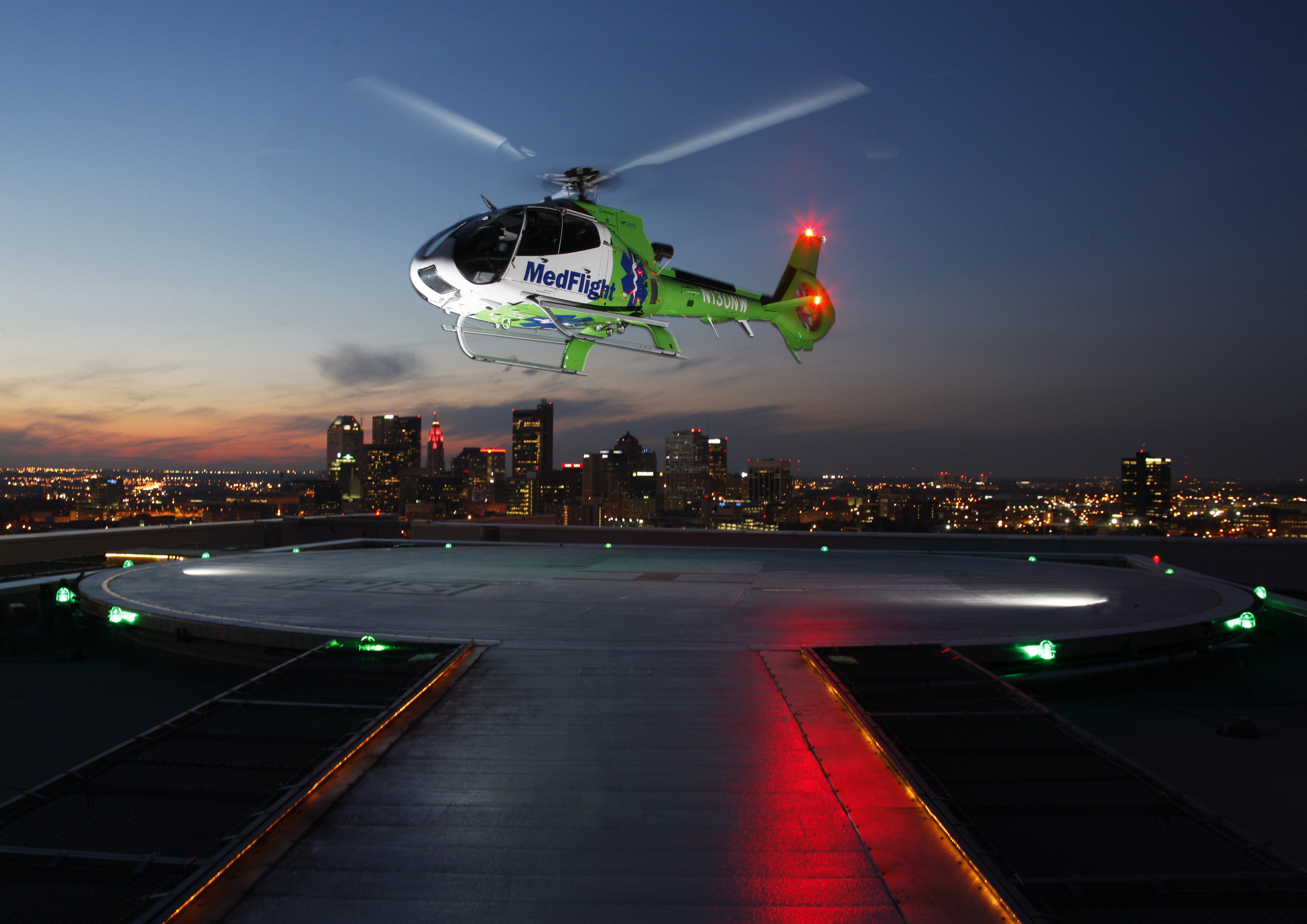
MedFlight's EC130 B4 Helicopter landing on Nationwide Children's Hospital

MedFlight is a non-profit, CAMTS-accredited critical care transport organization. MedFlight's headquarters is in Columbus, Ohio at the Ohio State University Airport (Don Scott Field) with nine helicopter bases and 3 Mobile ICU ground teams. Helicopter Aviation services are contracted to MedFlight through Metro Aviation, Inc.

Helicopter Base Locations

- MedFlight 1: Chillicothe, OH
- MedFlight 2: Marysville, OH
- MedFlight 3: Pomeroy, OH
- MedFlight 4: Coshocton, OH
- MedFlight 5: Galion, OH
- MedFlight 6: McConnelsville, OH
- MedFlight 7: Portsmouth, OH (A shared base with Healthnet Aeromedical Services) MedFlight 7 has been closed due to staffing issues.
- MedFlight 8: Eaton, OH
- MedFlight 9: Jeffersonville, OH

Mobile ICU Locations

- MedFlight 11: Columbus, OH
- MedFlight 12: Columbus, OH
- MedFlight 14: Chillicothe, OH
