= Seth M. Siegel =

American businessman, writer, and activist

- Born: 1953 (age 72–73)
- Education: BS; JD
- Alma mater: Cornell University; Cornell Law School
- Occupations: Writer; Activist
- Known for: Co-founder of The Beanstalk Group
- Notable work: Let There Be Water
- Website: sethmsiegel.com

Seth M. Siegel (born 1953) is an American businessman, writer, and activist. He is the author of the 2015 New York Times Best Seller, Let There Be Water: Israel's Solution for a Water-Starved World. He has also founded or co-founded several companies including, The Beanstalk Group and Sixpoint Partners. Additionally, Siegel has produced shows for Broadway and television, and his essays and articles have appeared in publications including The New York Times, Los Angeles Times, The Wall Street Journal, and others.

== Early life and education ==
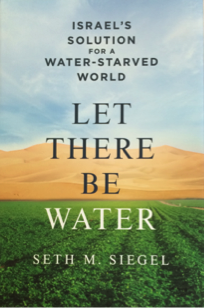
Let There Be Water by Seth M. Siegel

Siegel grew up in Queens, New York as the grandchild of Jewish immigrants. He attended Cornell University, graduating with a Bachelor of Science degree in 1974. After graduate studies at the Hebrew University of Jerusalem, Siegel returned to New York where he earned a Juris Doctor degree from Cornell Law School.

== Career ==
In 1992, Siegel co-founded The Beanstalk Group, a trademark licensing and brand extension company. Clients of the company included Coca-Cola and Harley-Davidson, and AT&T. The company was sold to the Ford Motor Company in June 2001, and was, in turn, sold to the Omnicom Group in 2005.

Siegel served as a producer of the 2002 Broadway revival of Man of La Mancha, which was nominated for three Tony Awards including Best Revival of a Musical. He was also a producer of the ABC miniseries, Dinotopia, which received six Emmy Award nominations and won Outstanding Special Visual Effects for a Miniseries, Movie or a Special. In 2007, Siegel co-founded Sixpoint Partners, a financial services firm.

In 2015, St. Martin's Press published Siegel's book, Let There Be Water: Israel's Solution for a Water-Starved World, which detailed the ways in which Israel successfully implemented water management and conservation policies despite its arid climate. Let There Be Water became a New York Times, Los Angeles Times, and Washington Post best seller and has appeared in multiple foreign-language editions. Since the publication of Let There Be Water, Siegel has lectured on water themes around the world. He is also a member of the Council on Foreign Relations.

== Bibliography ==
Year	Title	Original publisher	ISBN	Notes
2015	Let There Be Water: Israel's Solution for a Water-Starved World	St. Martin's Press	ISBN 9781250073952	New York Times Best Seller, The Washington Post Best Seller
2019	Troubled Water: What's Wrong with What We Drink	St. Martin's Press	ISBN 9781250132543	
