= 128th Ohio General Assembly =

Term of state legislature in Ohio, US

The One Hundred Twenty-eighth Ohio General Assembly was the legislative body of the state of Ohio from January 5, 2009, until December 31, 2010. Ted Strickland was Ohio Governor for its entirety. It was composed of the Ohio Senate and the Ohio House of Representatives. The apportionment of districts was based on the 2000 United States census. It marked the first time in fourteen years that the Ohio Democratic Party controlled the House of Representatives, while the Ohio Republican Party maintained control of the Ohio Senate.

== Party summary ==
=== Senate ===
Affiliation	Party (Shading indicates majority caucus)		Total	
Affiliation	Republican	Democratic	Total	Vacant
End of previous legislature	21	12	33	0
Begin	21	12	33	0
Latest voting share	63.6%	36.4%		

=== House of Representatives ===
Affiliation	Party (Shading indicates majority caucus)		Total	
Affiliation	Democratic	Republican	Total	Vacant
End of previous legislature	46	53	99	0
Begin	53	46	99	0
Latest voting share	53.5%	46.5%		

== Leadership ==
=== Senate ===
- President of the Senate: Bill Harris
- President pro tempore of the Senate: Tom Niehaus
- Floor Leader: Keith Faber
- Whip: Mark Wagoner (January 2009-January 2010); Steve Buehrer (January 2010-December 2010)
- Minority Leader: Capri Cafaro
- Assistant Minority Leader: Shirley Smith
- Minority Whip: Ray Miller
- Assistant Minority Whip: Jason Wilson

=== House of Representatives ===
- Speaker of the House: Armond Budish
- President pro tempore of the Senate: Matt Szollosi
- Majority Floor Leader: Tracy Maxwell Heard
- Assistant Majority Floor Leader: Allan Sayre
- Majority Whip: Jay Goyal
- Assistant Majority Whip: Linda Bolon
- Minority Leader: William G. Batchelder
- Assistant Minority Leader: Lou Blessing
- Minority Whip: John Adams
- Assistant Minority Whip: Cheryl Grossman

== Membership ==
=== Senate ===
District	Senator	Party	Residence	First elected	Term limited
1	Steve Buehrer	Republican	Delta	2006	2014
2	Mark Wagoner	Republican	Toledo	2008 (Appt.)	2016
3	David Goodman	Republican	New Albany	2001 (Appt.)	2010
4	Gary Cates	Republican	West Chester	2004	2012
5	Fred Strahorn	Democratic	Dayton	2009 (Appt.)	2018
6	Jon Husted	Republican	Kettering	2008	2016
7	Shannon Jones	Republican	Springboro	2009 (Appt.)	2018
8	Bill Seitz	Republican	Cincinnati	2007 (Appt.)	2016
9	Eric Kearney	Democratic	Cincinnati	2005 (Appt.)	2014
10	Chris Widener	Republican	Springfield	2008	2016
11	Teresa Fedor	Democratic	Toledo	2002	2010
12	Keith Faber	Republican	Celina	2007 (Appt.)	2016
13	Sue Morano	Democratic	Lorain	2006	2014
14	Tom Niehaus	Republican	New Richmond	2004	2012
15	Ray Miller	Democratic	Columbus	2002	2010
16	Jim Hughes	Republican	Columbus	2008	2016
17	John Carey	Republican	Wellston	2002	2010
18	Timothy Grendell	Republican	Chesterland	2004	2012
19	Bill Harris	Republican	Ashland	2000 (Appt.)	2010
20	Jimmy Stewart	Republican	Athens	2008	2016
21	Shirley Smith	Democratic	Cleveland	2006	2014
22	Vacant	Republican			
23	Dale Miller	Democratic	Cleveland	2006 (Appt.)	2014
24	Tom Patton	Republican	Strongsville	2008 (Appt.)	2016
25	Nina Turner	Democratic	Cleveland	2008 (Appt.)	2018
26	Karen Gillmor	Republican	Tiffin	2008	2016
27	Kevin Coughlin	Republican	Cuyahoga Falls	2001 (Appt.)	2010
28	Tom Sawyer	Democratic	Akron	2007 (Appt.)	2016
29	Kirk Schuring	Republican	Canton	2002	2010
30	Jason Wilson	Democratic	Columbiana	2007 (Appt.)	2016
31	Tim Schaffer	Republican	Lancaster	2006	2014
32	Capri Cafaro	Democratic	Hubbard	2007 (Appt.)	2016
33	Joe Schiavoni	Democratic	Canfield	2009 (Appt.)	2018

=== House of Representatives ===
District	Representative	Party	Residence	First elected	Term limited	
1	Linda Bolon	Democratic	East Palestine	2006	2014	
2	Kris Jordan	Republican	Dublin	2008	2016	
3	Ron Amstutz	Republican	Wooster	2008	2016	
4	Matt Huffman	Republican	Lima	2006	2014	
5	Gerald Stebelton	Republican	Lancaster	2006	2014	
6	Randy Gardner	Republican	Bowling Green	2008 (Appt.)	2016	
7	Kenny Yuko	Democratic	Richmond Heights	2004	2012	
8	Armond Budish	Democratic	Beachwood	2006	2014	
9	Barbara Boyd	Democratic	Cleveland Heights	2006	2014	
10	Robin Belcher	Democratic	Cleveland	2009 (Appt.)	2018	
11	Sandra Williams	Democratic	Cleveland	2006	2014	
12	Michael DeBose	Democratic	Cleveland	2002 (Appt.)	2010	
13	Michael J. Skindell	Democratic	Lakewood	2002	2010	
14	Michael Foley	Democratic	Cleveland	2006 (Appt.)	2014	
15	Timothy J. DeGeeter	Democratic	Parma	2003 (Appt.)	2012	
16	Nan Baker	Republican	Westlake	2008	2016	
17	Josh Mandel	Republican	Lyndhurst	2006	2014	
18	Matt Patten	Democratic	Strongsville	2008	2016	
19	Marian Harris	Democratic	Columbus	2008	2016	
20	Nancy Garland	Democratic	New Albany	2008	2016	
21	Kevin Bacon	Republican	Columbus	2006	2014	
22	John Patrick Carney	Democratic	Clintonville	2008	2016	
23	Cheryl Grossman	Republican	Grove City	2008	2016	
24	Ted Celeste	Democratic	Upper Arlington	2006	2014	
25	Dan Stewart	Democratic	Columbus	2002	2010	
26	Tracy Maxwell Heard	Democratic	Columbus	2006	2014	
27	W. Carlton Weddington	Democratic	Columbus	2008	2016	
28	Connie Pillich	Democratic	Montgomery	2008	2016	
29	Lou Blessing	Republican	Cincinnati	2004	2012	
30	Robert Mecklenborg	Republican	Cincinnati	2007 (Appt.)	2016	
31	Denise Driehaus	Democratic	Cincinnati	2008	2016	
32	Dale Mallory	Democratic	Cincinnati	2006	2014	
33	Alicia Reece	Democratic	Cincinnati	2010 (Appt.)	2018	
34	Peter Stautberg	Republican	Anderson Twp.	2008	2016	
35	Ron Maag	Republican	Lebanon	2008	2016	
36	Seth Morgan	Republican	Huber Heights	2008	2016	
37	Peggy Lehner	Republican	Kettering	2008	2016	
38	Terry Blair	Republican	Washington Twp.	2008	2016	
39	Clayton Luckie	Democratic	Dayton	2006 (Appt.)	2014	
40	Roland Winburn	Democratic	Harrison Twp.	2008	2016	
41	Brian Williams	Democratic	Akron	2004	2012	
42	Mike Moran	Democratic	Hudson	2008	2016	
43	Steve Dyer	Democratic	Green	2006	2014	
44	Vernon Sykes	Democratic	Akron	2006	2014	
45	John Otterman	Democratic	Akron	2008 (Appt.)	2016	
46	Barbara Sears	Republican	Sylvania	2008 (Appt.)	2016	
47	Joe Walter	Democratic	Toledo	2010 (Appt.)	2018	
48	Edna Brown	Democratic	Toledo	2001 (Appt.)	2010	
49	Matt Szollosi	Democratic	Toledo	2006	2014	
50	Todd Snitchler	Republican	Uniontown	2008	2016	
51	Scott Oelslager	Republican	Canton	2002	2010	
52	Stephen Slesnick	Democratic	Canton	2008 (Appt.)	2016	
53	Timothy Derickson	Republican	Hanover Twp	2008	2016	
54	Courtney Combs	Republican	Hamilton	2004 (Appt.)	2012	
55	Bill Coley	Republican	West Chester Twp.	2004	2012	
56	Joseph Koziura	Democratic	Lorain	2001 (Appt.)	2010	
57	Matt Lundy	Democratic	Elyria	2006	2014	
58	Terry Boose	Republican	Norwalk	2008	2016	
59	Ron Gerberry	Democratic	Austintown	2007 (Appt.)	2016	
60	Bob Hagan	Democratic	Youngstown	2006	2014	
61	Mark Okey	Democratic	Carrollton	2006	2014	
62	Lorraine Fende	Democratic	Willowick	2004	2012	
63	Mark Schneider	Democratic	Mentor	2008	2016	
64	Tom Letson	Democratic	Warren	2006	2014	
65	Sandra Harwood	Democratic	Niles	2002	2010	
66	Joe Uecker	Republican	Loveland	2004	2012	
67	Peter Beck	Republican	Mason	2009 (Appt.)	2018	
68	Kathleen Chandler	Democratic	Kent	2002	2010	
69	William G. Batchelder	Republican	Medina	2006	2014	
70	Jarrod Martin	Republican	Beavercreek	2008	2016	
71	Jay Hottinger	Republican	Newark	2006	2014	
72	Ross McGregor	Republican	Springfield	2005 (Appt.)	2014	
73	Jay Goyal	Democratic	Mansfield	2006	2014	
74	Bruce Goodwin	Republican	Defiance	2006	2014	Finance and Appropriations Agriculture and Development Subcommittee Ranking Member
75	Lynn Wachtmann	Republican	Napoleon	2006	2014	Health Committee Ranking Member
76	Cliff Hite	Republican	Findlay	2006	2014	Faith-based Initiatives Committee Ranking Member
77	Jim Zehringer	Republican	Fort Recovery	2007 (Appt.)	2016	Agriculture and Natural Resources Committee Ranking Member
78	John Adams	Republican	Sidney	2006	2014	Minority Whip
79	Richard Adams	Republican	Troy	2008	2016	
80	Dennis Murray	Democratic	Sandusky	2008	2016	
81	Jeff Wagner	Republican	Sycamore	2002	2010	
82	Jeffrey McClain	Republican	Upper Sandusky	2008	2016	
83	David Burke	Republican	Marysville	2008	2016	Finance and Appropriations Human Services Subcommittee Ranking Member
84	Bob Hackett	Republican	London	2008	2016	
85	Raymond Pryor	Democratic	Chillicothe	2008	2016	
86	David T. Daniels	Republican	Greenfield	2002	2010	State Government Committee Ranking Member
87	Clyde Evans	Republican	Rio Grande	2002	2010	Public Security and Homeland Security Committee Ranking Member
88	Danny Bubp	Republican	West Union	2004	2012	Veterans Affairs Committee Ranking Member
89	Todd Book	Democratic	McDermott	2002	2010	Rules and Reference Committee Chairman
90	Margaret Ruhl	Republican	Mount Vernon	2008	2016	
91	Dan Dodd	Democratic	Hebron	2006	2014	Insurance Committee Chairman
92	Debbie Phillips	Democratic	Athens	2008	2016	
93	Larry Woodford	Democratic	Marietta	2010 (Appt.)	2020	
94	Troy Balderson	Republican	Muskingum	2008	2016	
95	John Domenick	Democratic	Smithfield	2002	2010	
96	Joshua O'Farrell	Democratic	New Philadelphia	2010 (Appt.)	2018	
97	Dave Hall	Republican	Killbuck	2008	2016	
98	Richard Hollington	Republican	Chagrin Falls	2010 (Appt.)	2018	
99	Deborah Newcomb	Democratic	Conneaut	2008 (Appt.)	2016	

Appt.- Member was appointed to current House Seat

== Changes in membership ==
=== Senate ===
There were three resignations and one death.

33rd District	John Boccieri (D)	Resigned December 31, 2008 to become a member of the United States House of Representatives.	Joe Schiavoni (D)	January 6, 2009
5th District	Tom Roberts (D)	Resigned February 28, 2009 to become a member of the Ohio Civil Rights Commission.	Fred Strahorn (D)	March 31, 2009
7th District	Bob Schuler (R)	Schuler dies June 13, 2009, while in office.	Shannon Jones (R)	August 11, 2009
22nd District	Bob Gibbs (R)	Resigned December 31, 2010 to become a member of the United States House of Representatives.	Larry Obhof (R)	February 2, 2011

=== House of Representatives ===
There were seven resignations.

10th District	Eugene Miller (D)	Resigned to take a seat on Cleveland City Council.	Robin Belcher (D)	March 16, 2009
67th District	Shannon Jones (R)	Resigned to take a seat in the Ohio Senate.	Peter Beck (R)	September 20, 2009
98th District	Matt Dolan (R)	Resigned to focus on a run for Cuyahoga County Executive.	Richard Hollington (R)	February 6, 2010
33rd District	Tyrone Yates (D)	Resigned to become a judge on the Hamilton County Municipal Court.	Alicia Reece	March 3, 2010
47th District	Peter Ujvagi (D)	Resigned to become the administrator for Lucas County.	Joe Walter	March 24, 2010
96th District	Allan Sayre (D)	Resigned to become city manager for Dover, Ohio.	Joshua O'Farrell	June 2, 2010
93rd District	Jennifer Garrison (D)	Resigned to become a member of the Ohio Consumers Council.	Larry Woodford	December 7, 2010

== See also ==
- List of Ohio state legislatures
