= 2018 Ohio elections =

- November 6, 2018

The 2018 Ohio general elections were held on November 6, 2018, throughout Ohio.

== Federal ==
=== Senate ===
Democratic U.S. Senator Sherrod Brown—the only elected Democratic statewide officeholder in Ohio as of July 2017—won re-election to a third term, defeating Republican U.S. Representative Jim Renacci in the general election.

=== House of Representatives ===
All of Ohio's 16 seats in the United States House of Representatives were up for election in 2018.

== Governor and lieutenant governor ==
Incumbent Republican governor John Kasich and lieutenant governor Mary Taylor were term-limited and could not run for a third consecutive term.

=== Results ===
Ohio gubernatorial election, 2018
Party	Candidate	Votes	%
Republican	Mike DeWine / Jon Husted	2,235,825	50.40
Democratic	Richard Cordray / Betty Sutton	2,070,046	46.67
Libertarian	Travis Irvine / Todd Grayson	80,055	1.80
Green	Constance Gadell-Newton / Brett R. Joseph	49,536	1.12
n/a	Write-ins	358	0.00
Total votes		4,435,820	100.0
Republican hold			

== Attorney general ==
Incumbent Republican attorney general Mike DeWine was term-limited and could not run for a third consecutive term.

=== Results ===
Ohio Attorney General election, 2018
Party	Candidate	Votes	%
Republican	Dave Yost	2,276,414	52.17
Democratic	Steve Dettelbach	2,086,715	47.83
Total votes		4,363,129	100.0
Republican hold			

== Secretary of state ==
2018 Ohio Secretary of State election
- November 6, 2018
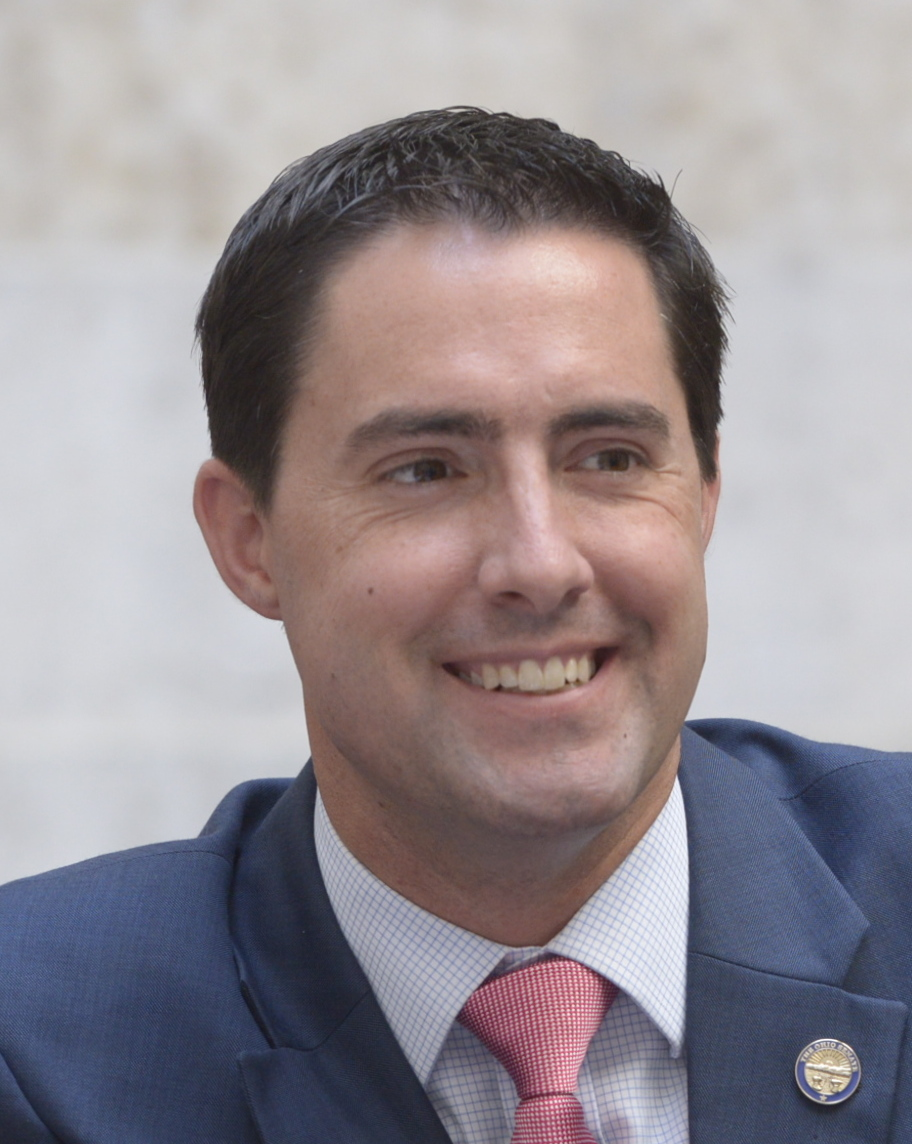

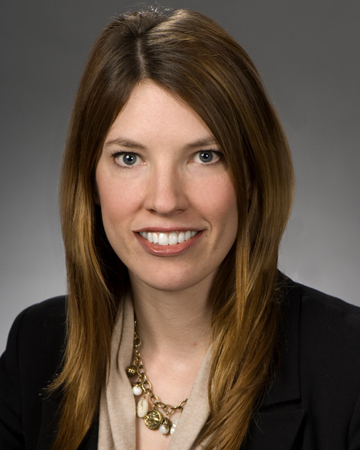
Nominee	Frank LaRose	Kathleen Clyde
Party	Republican	Democratic
Popular vote	2,214,273	2,052,098
Percentage	50.67%	46.96%
- LaRose: 40–50% 50–60% 60–70% 70–80% 80–90% 90%+ Clyde: 40–50% 50–60% 60–70% 70–80% 80–90% 90%+ Tie: 40–50% No data
Secretary of State before election
Jon Husted
Republican
Elected Secretary of State
Frank LaRose
Republican

Incumbent Republican secretary of state Jon Husted was term-limited and could not run for a third consecutive term.

=== Republican primary ===
==== Candidates ====
===== Declared =====
- Frank LaRose, state senator

===== Withdrawn =====
- Dorothy Pelanda, state representative

==== Results ====
Republican primary results
Party	Candidate	Votes	%
Republican	Frank LaRose	606,697	100.0
Total votes		606,697	100.0

=== Democratic primary ===
==== Candidates ====
===== Declared =====
- Kathleen Clyde, state representative

==== Results ====
Democratic primary results
Party	Candidate	Votes	%
Democratic	Kathleen Clyde	514,959	100.0
Total votes		514,959	100.0

=== General election ===
==== Predictions ====
Source	Ranking	As of
Governing	Tossup	October 11, 2018

==== Endorsements ====
Kathleen Clyde (D)

U.S. executive branch officials

- Barack Obama, 44th president of the United States

Newspapers

- Plain Dealer
Frank LaRose (R)

Organizations

- Fraternal Order of Police of Ohio
- Ohio Chamber of Commerce

==== Polling ====
Poll source	Date(s) administered	Sample size	Margin of error	Frank LaRose (R)	Kathleen Clyde (D)	Undecided
Baldwin Wallace University	October 19–27, 2018	1,051	± 3.8%	33%	39%	21%
Change Research (D-Innovation Ohio)	August 31 – September 4, 2018	822	± 3.0%	42%	40%	18%
Fallon Research	May 21–25, 2018	800	± 3.5%	32%	31%	37%
Public Policy Polling (D-ODP)	April 25–26, 2018	770	± 3.5%	40%	43%	17%

==== Results ====
Ohio Secretary of State election, 2018
Party	Candidate	Votes	%
Republican	Frank LaRose	2,214,273	50.67
Democratic	Kathleen Clyde	2,052,098	46.96
Libertarian	Dustin Nanna	103,506	2.37
n/a	Write-ins	79	0.00
Total votes		4,369,956	100.0
Republican hold			

== Treasurer ==
2018 Ohio State Treasurer election
- November 6, 2018
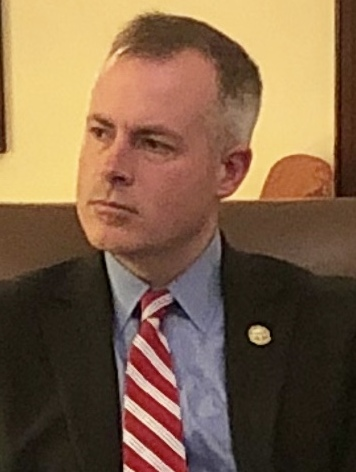

Nominee	Robert Sprague	Rob Richardson Jr.
Party	Republican	Democratic
Popular vote	2,308,425	2,024,194
Percentage	53.28%	46.72%
- Sprague: 50–60% 60–70% 70–80% 80–90% 90%+ Richardson: 50–60% 60–70% 70–80% 80–90% 90%+ Tie: 50% No data
State Treasurer before election
Josh Mandel
Republican
Elected State Treasurer
Robert Sprague
Republican

Incumbent Republican state treasurer Josh Mandel was term-limited and could not run for a third consecutive term.

=== Republican primary ===
==== Candidates ====
===== Declared =====
- Sandra "Sandy" O'Brien, former Ashtabula County auditor
- Robert Sprague, state representative

===== Withdrawn =====
- Clarence Mingo, Franklin County Auditor

===== Declined =====
- Keith Faber, state representative and former Ohio Senate president (running for state auditor)

==== Results ====
Republican primary results
Party	Candidate	Votes	%
Republican	Robert Sprague	412,312	57.5
Republican	Sandra O'Brien	304,540	42.5
Total votes		716,852	100.0

=== Democratic primary ===
==== Candidates ====
===== Declared =====
- Rob Richardson Jr., former chair of the University of Cincinnati board of trustees and candidate for mayor of Cincinnati in 2017

===== Withdrawn =====
- Neil Patel, president and chairman of the Central Ohio Chapter of the Federation of Indian Associations

===== Declined =====
- Jeremy Blake, Newark city councilman (running for state representative)

==== Results ====
Democratic primary results
Party	Candidate	Votes	%
Democratic	Rob Richardson	500,640	100.0
Total votes		500,640	100.0

=== General election ===
==== Endorsements ====
Robert Sprague (R)

Organizations

- Ohio Society of CPAs

Newspapers

- Plain Dealer

==== Polling ====
Poll source	Date(s) administered	Sample size	Margin of error	Robert Sprague (R)	Rob Richardson (D)	Paul Curry (G)	Undecided
Baldwin Wallace University	October 19–27, 2018	1,051	± 3.8%	36%	38%	–	22%
Change Research (D-Innovation Ohio)	August 31 – September 4, 2018	822	± 3.0%	41%	38%	—	21%
Fallon Research	May 21–25, 2018	800	± 3.5%	33%	30%	5%	32%

==== Results ====
Ohio State Treasurer election, 2018
Party	Candidate	Votes	%
Republican	Robert Sprague	2,308,425	53.28
Democratic	Rob Richardson	2,024,194	46.72
Total votes		4,332,619	100.0
Republican hold			

== Auditor ==
Incumbent Republican state auditor Dave Yost was term-limited and could not run for a third consecutive term.

=== Results ===
Ohio State Auditor election, 2018
Party	Candidate	Votes	%
Republican	Keith Faber	2,156,663	49.68
Democratic	Zach Space	2,008,295	46.26
Libertarian	Robert Coogan	175,962	4.05
Total votes		4,340,920	100.0
Republican hold			

== General Assembly ==
=== Senate ===
The 17 odd-numbered districts out of 33 seats in the Ohio Senate were up for election in 2018. Before the election, nine of these seats were held by Republicans, seven were held by Democrats, and one was vacant.

Senatorial district	Incumbent			This race	
District	Senator	Party	First elected	Incumbent status	Candidates
1	Rob McColley	Republican	2017 (appointed)	Running	Adam Papin (Democratic) 26.73% 32,765 Rob McColley (Republican) 73.26% 89,810
3	Kevin Bacon	Republican	2010	Not running (term-limited)	Tina Maharath (Democratic) 50.27% 66,438 Anne Gonzales (Republican) 49.73% 65,733
5	Bill Beagle	Republican	2010	Not running (term-limited)	Paul Bradley (Democratic); 47.08% 55,669 Steve Huffman (Republican) 52.92% 62,574
7	Steve Wilson	Republican	2017 (appointed)	Running	Sara Bitter (Democratic) 38.02% 60,344 Steve Wilson (Republican) 61.98% 98,370
9	Cecil Thomas	Democratic	2014	Running	Cecil Thomas (Democratic) 76.29% 99,205 Tom Chandler (Republican) 23.71% 30,833
11	Edna Brown	Democratic	2010	Not running (term-limited)	Teresa Fedor (Democratic) 69.42% 73,934 Ernest McCarthy (Republican) 30.58% 32,567
13	Gayle Manning	Republican	2010	Not running (term-limited)	Sharon Sweda (Democratic) 44.23% 58,159 Nathan Manning (Republican) 52.70% 69,286 Homer Taft (Libertarian) 3.07% 4,037
15	Charleta Tavares	Democratic	2010	Not running (term-limited)	Hearcel Craig (Democratic) 82.52% 107,505 Jordan Garcea (Republican) 17.48% 22,778
17	Bob Peterson	Republican	2012 (appointed)	Running	Scott Dailey (Democratic) 29.59% 33,573 Bob Peterson (Republican) 70.41% 79,880
19	Kris Jordan	Republican	2010	Not running (term-limited)	Louise Valentine (Democratic) 47.71% 77,247 Andrew Brenner (Republican) 50.41% 81,623 Gary Cox (Green) 1.88% 3,041
21	Sandra Williams	Democratic	2014	Running	Sandra Williams (Democratic) 87.72% 97,282 Thomas Pekarek (Republican) 12.28% 13,621
23	Michael J. Skindell	Democratic	2010	Not running (term-limited)	Nickie Antonio (Democratic) 65.41% 69,907 Steve Flores (Republican) 34.59% 36,968
25	Kenny Yuko	Democratic	2014	Running	Kenny Yuko (Democratic) 75% 97,503 William Faehnrich (Republican) 25% 32,506
27	Frank LaRose	Republican	2010	Not running (term-limited; running for secretary of state)	Adam VanHo (Democratic) 41.54% 59.711 Kristina Roegner (Republican) 58.46% 84,031
29	Scott Oelslager	Republican	2010	Not running (term-limited)	Lauren Friedman (Democratic) 40.30% 50,932 Kirk Schuring (Republican) 59.70% 75,449
31	Jay Hottinger	Republican	2014	Running	Melinda Miller (Democratic) 33.11% 42,578 Jay Hottinger (Republican) 66.89% 86,019
33	Joe Schiavoni	Democratic	2009 (appointed)	Not running (term-limited; running for governor) Republican gain	John Boccieri (Democratic) 47.58% 60,575; Michael Rulli (Republican) 52.42% 66,731

=== House of Representatives ===
All 99 seats in the Ohio House of Representatives were up for election in 2018. Before the election, 65 of these seats were held by Republicans, 33 were held by Democrats, and one seat was vacant.

House district	Incumbent			This race	
District	Representative	Party	First elected	Incumbent status	Candidates
1	Scott Wiggam	Republican	2016	Running	Kevin Barnet (Democratic) 29% Scott Wiggam (Republican) 66%
2	Mark Romanchuk	Republican	2012	Running	Lane Winters (Democratic) 30% Mark Romanchuk (Republican) 68%
3	Theresa Gavarone	Republican	2016 (appointed)	Running	Daniel Gordon (Democratic) 38% Theresa Gavarone (Republican) 62%
4	Robert R. Cupp	Republican	2014	Running	Tristam Cheeseman (Democratic) 27% Robert R. Cupp (Republican) 73%
5	Tim Ginter	Republican	2014	Running	John Dyce (Democratic) 30% Tim Ginter (Republican) 70%
6	Marlene Anielski	Republican	2010	Not running (term-limited) Democratic gain	Phil Robinson (Democratic) 51% Jim Trakas (Republican) 49%
7	Tom Patton	Republican	2016	Running	Aziz Ahmed (Democratic); 39% Tom Patton (Republican) 61%
8	Kent Smith	Democratic	2014	Running	Kent Smith (Democratic) 100%
9	Janine Boyd	Democratic	2014	Running	Janine Boyd (Democratic) 88% Joe Miller (Republican) 12%
10	Bill Patmon	Democratic	2010	Not running (term-limited)	Terrence Upchurch (Democratic) 100%
11	Stephanie Howse	Democratic	2014	Running	Stephanie Howse (Democratic) 87% Shalira Taylor (Republican) 13%
12	John E. Barnes, Jr.	Democratic	2010	Not running (term-limited)	Juanita Brent (Democratic) 100%
13	Nickie Antonio	Democratic	2010	Not running (term-limited)	Mike Skindell (Democratic) 78% Jay Carson (Republican) 22%
14	Martin J. Sweeney	Democratic	2014	Not running (running for Ohio Senate)	Bride Sweeney (Democratic) 72% Ryan McClain (Libertarian) 28%
15	Nicholas J. Celebrezze	Democratic	2012 (appointed)	Running	Jeffrey Crossman (Democratic) 56% Kevin Kussmaul (Republican) 44%
16	David Greenspan	Republican	2016	Running	Cassimir Svigeli (Democratic) 46% David Greenspan (Republican) 54%
17	Adam Miller	Democratic	2016	Running	Adam Miller (Democratic) 60% John Rush (Republican) 40%
18	Kristin Boggs	Democratic	2016 (appointed)	Running	Kristin Boggs (Democratic) 80% David Todd (Republican) 20%
19	Anne Gonzales	Republican	2010	Not running (term-limited)	Mary Lightbody (Democratic) 55% Tim Barhorst (Republican) 45%
20	Richard Brown	Democratic	2017 (appointed)	Running	Richard Brown (Democratic) 58% Bobby Mitchell (Republican) 42%
21	Mike Duffey	Republican	2010	Not running (term-limited)	Beth Liston (Democratic); Stu Harris (Republican) 57% Stu Harris (Republican) 43%
22	David J. Leland	Democratic	2014	Running	David J. Leland (Democratic) 73% Doug Moody (Republican) 27%
23	Laura Lanese	Republican	2016	Running	Russell Harris (Democratic) 44% Laura Lanese (Republican) 56%
24	Jim Hughes	Republican	2016	Not running (running for Court of Common Pleas) Democratic gain	Allison Russo (Democratic) 57% Erik Yassenof (Republican) 43%
25	Bernadine Kent	Democratic	2016	Running	Bernadine Kent (Democratic) 84% Debbie Staggs (Republican) 16%
26	Hearcel Craig	Democratic	2014	Not running (running for Ohio Senate)	Erica Crawley (Democratic) 82% Shareeque Sadiq (Republican) 15% Steve Dodge (Green) 2%
27	Tom Brinkman	Republican	2014	Running	Christine Fisher (Democratic) 46% Tom Brinkman (Republican) 54%
28	Jonathan Dever	Republican	2014	Running; Democratic gain	Jessica Miranda (Democratic) 50% Jonathan Dever (Republican) 50%
29	Louis Blessing	Republican	2012	Running	Carrie Davis (Democratic) 35% Louis Blessing (Republican) 65%
30	Bill Seitz	Republican	2016	Running	Clayton Adams (Democratic) 30% Bill Seitz (Republican) 70%
31	Brigid Kelly	Democratic	2016	Running	Brigid Kelly (Democratic) 100%
32	Catherine Ingram	Democratic	2016	Running	Catherine Ingram (Democratic) 79% Marilyn Tunnat (Republican) 21%
33	Alicia Reece	Democratic	2010 (appointed)	Not running (term-limited)	Sedrick Denson (Democratic) 75% Judith Boyce (Republican) 25%
34	Emilia Sykes	Democratic	2014	Running	Emilia Sykes (Democratic) 78% Josh Sines (Republican) 22%
35	Tavia Galonski	Democratic	2014	Running	Tavia Galonski (Democratic) 61% Osita Obierika (Republican) 34% Kevin Fay (Green) 5%
36	Anthony DeVitis	Republican	2011 (appointed)	Running	Tim Piatt (Democratic) 45% Anthony DeVittis (Republican) 55%
37	Kristina Roegner	Republican	2010	Not running (term-limited) Democratic gain	Casey Weinstein (Democratic) 51% Mike Rasor (Republican) 49%
38	Marilyn Slaby	Republican	2012 (appointed)	Not running (retiring)	Elliot Kolkovich (Democratic) 43% Bill Roemer (Republican) 57%
39	Fred Strahorn	Democratic	2012	Running	Fred Strahorn (Democratic) 100%
40	Michael Henne	Republican	2010	Not running (term-limited)	Ryan Taylor (Democratic) 38% Phil Plummer (Republican) 62%
41	Jim Butler	Republican	2011 (appointed)	Running	John McManus (Democratic) 45% Jim Butler (Republican) 55%
42	Niraj Antani	Republican	2014 (appointed)	Running	Zach Dickerson (Democratic) 40% Niraj Antani (Republican) 60%
43	Jeff Rezabek	Republican	2014	Not running (running for Judge)	Dan Foley (Democratic) 49% Todd Smith (Republican) 51%
44	Michael Ashford	Democratic	2010	Not running (term-limited)	Paula Hicks-Hudson (Democratic); Kenneth Cousino (Republican) 100%
45	Teresa Fedor	Democratic	2010	Not running (term-limited)	Lisa Sobecki (Democratic) 64% David Davenport (Republican) 36%
46	Michael Sheehy	Democratic	2013 (appointed)	Running	Michael Sheehy (Democratic) 100%
47	Derek Merrin	Republican	2016 (appointed)	Running	Gary Newnham (Democratic) 42% Derek Merrin (Republican) 58%
48	Kirk Schuring	Republican	2010	Not running (term-limited)	Lorraine Wilburn (Democratic) 36% Scott Oelslager (Republican) 64%
49	Thomas West	Democratic	2016	Running	Thomas West (Democratic) 58% James Haavisto (Republican) 42%
50	Christina Hagan	Republican	2011 (appointed)	Not running (running for U.S. representative)	Cassie Gabelt (Democratic) 34% Reggie Stoltzfus (Republican) 64%
51	Wes Retherford	Republican	2012	Not running (defeated in primary)	Susan Vaughn (Democratic) 40% Sara Carruthers (Republican) 60%
52	George Lang	Republican	2017 (appointed)	Running	Kathy Wyenandt (Democratic) 41% George Lang (Republican) 59%
53	Candice Keller	Republican	2016 (appointed)	Running	Rebecca Howard (Democratic) 36% Candice Keller (Republican) 64%
54	Paul Zeltwanger	Republican	2014	Running	Nikki Foster (Democratic) 39% Paul Zeltwanger (Republican) 61%
55	Nathan Manning	Republican	2014	Not running (running for Ohio Senate)	Kelly Kraus Mencke (Democratic) 45% Gayle Manning (Republican) 55%
56	Dan Ramos	Democratic	2010	Not running (term-limited)	Joe Miller (Democratic) 63% Rob Weber (Republican) 37%
57	Dick Stein	Republican	2016	Running	James Johnson (Democratic) 37% Dick Stein (Republican) 63%
58	Michele Lepore-Hagan	Democratic	2014	Running	Michele Lepore-Hagan (Democratic) 70% David Simon (Republican) 30%
59	John Boccieri	Democratic	2015 (appointed)	Not running (running for state senator); Republican gain	Eric Ungaro (Democratic) 49.6% Don Manning (Republican) 50.4%
60	John Rogers	Democratic	2012	Running	John Rogers (Democratic) 54% Mike Zuren (Republican) 46%
61	Ron Young	Republican	2010	Not running (term-limited)	Rick Walker (Democratic) 40% Jamie Callender (Republican) 60%
62	Scott Lipps	Republican	2016	Running	Jim Staton (Democratic) 26% Scott Lipps (Republican) 74%
63	Glenn Holmes	Democratic	2016	Running	Glenn Holmes (Democratic) 56% Jim Hughes (Republican) 44%
64	Michael O'Brien	Democratic	2014	Running	Michael O'Brien (Democratic) 55% Martha Yoder (Republican) 45%
65	John Becker	Republican	2012	Running	Patricia Lawrence (Democratic) 33% John Becker (Republican) 67%
66	Doug Green	Republican	2012	Running	Jeff Richards (Democratic) 25% Doug Green (Republican) 75%
67	Andrew Brenner	Republican	2010	Not running (term-limited; running for state senator)	Cory Hoffman (Democratic) 44% Kris Jordan (Republican) 56%
68	Rick Carfagna	Republican	2016	Running	Kathleen Tate (Democratic) 34% Rick Carfagna (Republican) 64% Patrick Glasgow (Libertarian) 2%
69	Steve Hambley	Republican	2014	Running	Carol Brenstuhl (Democratic) 36% Steve Hambley (Republican) 64%
70	Darrell Kick	Republican	2016	Running	Steve Johnson (Democratic) 35% Darrell Kick (Republican) 65%
71	Scott Ryan	Republican	2014	Running	Jeremy Blake (Democratic) 38% Scott Ryan (Republican) 62%
72	Larry Householder	Republican	2016	Running	Tyler Shipley (Democratic) 31% Larry Householder (Republican) 69%
73	Rick Perales	Republican	2012	Running	Kim McCarthy (Democratic) 40% Rick Perales (Republican) 60%
74	Bill Dean	Republican	2016 (appointed)	Running	Anne Gorman (Democratic) 32% Bill Dean (Republican) 68%
75	Kathleen Clyde	Democratic	2010	Not running (term-limited; running for secretary of state)	Randi Clites (Democratic) 52% Jim Lutz (Republican); Austin Bashore (write-in) (Green) 48%
76	Sarah LaTourette	Republican	2014	Running	John Kennedy (Democratic) 38% Sarah LaTourette (Republican) 62%
77	Tim Schaffer	Republican	2014	Running	Brett Pransky (Democratic) 36% Tim Schaffer (Republican) 62% Kryssi Wichers (Libertarian) 2%
78	Ron Hood	Republican	2012	Running	Amber Daniels (Democratic) 32% Ron Hood (Republican) 68%
79	Kyle Koehler	Republican	2014	Running	Amanda Finfrock (Democratic) 40% Kyle Koehler (Republican) 60%
80	Steve Huffman	Republican	2014	Not running (running for state senator)	Scott Zimmerman (Democratic) 25% Jena Powell (Republican) 75%
81	James Hoops	Republican	2014	Running	Janet Breneman (Democratic) 25% James Hoops (Republican) 75%
82	Craig Riedel	Republican	2016	Running	Aden Baker (Democratic) 26% Craig Riedel (Republican) 74%
83	Robert Sprague	Republican	2011 (appointed)	Not running (running for treasurer)	Mary Harshfield (Democratic) 31% Jon Cross (Republican) 69%
84	Keith Faber	Republican	2016	Not running (running for auditor)	Joseph Monbeck (Democratic) 18% Susan Manchester (Republican) 82%
85	Nino Vitale	Republican	2014	Running	Garrett Baldwin (Democratic) 27% Nino Vitale (Republican) 73%
86	Dorothy Pelanda	Republican	2011 (appointed)	Not running (running for secretary of state)	Glenn Coble (Democratic) 28% Tracy Richardson (Republican) 69% Taylor Hoffman (Libertarian) 3%
87	Riordan McClain	Republican	2018 (Appointed)		Mary Pierce-Broadwater (Democratic) 27% Riordan McClain (Republican) 73%
88	Bill Reineke	Republican	2014	Running	Rachel Crooks (Democratic) 34% Bill Reineke (Republican) 66%
89	Steve Arndt	Republican	2015 (appointed)	Running	Joe Helle (Democratic) 35% Steve Arndt (Republican) 65%
90	Terry Johnson	Republican	2010	Not running (term-limited)	Adrienne Buckler (Democratic) 39% Brian Baldridge (Republican) 61%
91	Shane Wilkin	Republican	2018 (appointed)	Running	Justin Grimes (Democratic) 26% Shane Wilkin (Republican) 74%
92	Gary Scherer	Republican	2012 (appointed)	Running	Beth Workman (Democratic) Gary Scherer (Republican)
93	Ryan Smith	Republican	2012 (appointed)	Running	Jim Rumley (Democratic) 36% Ryan Smith (Republican) 64%
94	Jay Edwards	Republican	2016	Running	Taylor Sappington (Democratic) 42% Jay Edwards (Republican) 58%
95	Andy Thompson	Republican	2010	Not running (term-limited)	Dan Milleson (Democratic) 34% Don Jones (Republican) 66%
96	Jack Cera	Democratic	2011 (appointed)	Running	Jack Cera (Democratic) 100%
97	Brian Hill	Republican	2011 (appointed)	Running	Kristine Geis (Democratic) 32% Brian Hill (Republican) 68%
98	Al Landis	Republican	2010	Not running (term-limited)	Jeremiah Johnson (Democratic) 32% Brett Hillyer (Republican) 68%
99	John Patterson	Democratic	2012	Running	John Patterson (Democratic) 53% Michael Pircio (Republican) 47%

== Supreme Court ==
2018 Ohio Supreme Court elections
- November 6, 2018

2 seats of the Supreme Court of Ohio
	Majority party	Minority party
Party	Republican	Democratic
Last election	7	0
Seats won	0	2
Seat change	▼2	▲2

While judicial races in Ohio are technically non-partisan (party affiliations are not listed on the ballot), candidates run in party primaries. Terms are six years, and justices may run for re-election an unlimited number of times before their 70th birthday.

=== Associate justice (term commencing 01/01/2019) ===
2018 Ohio Supreme Court election (O'Donnell seat)
- November 6, 2018
Nominee	Michael Donnelly	Craig Baldwin
Popular vote	2,170,227	1,385,435
Percentage	61.0%	39.0%
- County results Donnelly: 50–60% 60–70% 70–80% Baldwin: 50–60% 60–70%
Justice before election
Terrence O'Donnell
Republican
Elected Justice
Michael Donnelly
Democratic

Incumbent Associate Justice Terrence O'Donnell, a Republican, did not seek reelection as he had reached the mandatory retirement age.

==== Republican primary ====
===== Candidates =====
- Craig Baldwin, incumbent judge of the Ohio Court of Appeals for the 5th District

===== Results =====
Republican primary results
Party	Candidate	Votes	%
Republican	Craig Baldwin	595,000	100.0%
Total votes		595,000	100.0%

==== Democratic primary ====
===== Candidates =====
- Michael P. Donnelly, Cuyahoga County Court of Common Pleas judge

===== Results =====
Democratic primary results
Party	Candidate	Votes	%
Democratic	Michael P. Donnelly	501,831	100.0%
Total votes		501,831	100.0%

==== General election ====
===== Results =====
2018 Ohio Supreme Court associate justice (term commencing 01/01/2019) election
Party	Candidate	Votes	%
Nonpartisan	Michael P. Donnelly	2,170,227	61.04%
Nonpartisan	Craig Baldwin	1,385,435	38.96%
Total votes		3,555,662	100.0%
Democratic gain from Republican			

=== Associate justice (term commencing 01/02/2019) ===
2018 Ohio Supreme Court election (DeGenaro seat)
- November 6, 2018
Nominee	Melody J. Stewart	Mary DeGenaro
Party	Nonpartisan	Nonpartisan
Alliance	Democratic	Republican
Popular vote	1,853,418	1,667,258
Percentage	52.6%	47.4%
- County results Stewart: 50–60% 60–70% DeGenaro: 50–60% 60–70%
Justice before election
Mary DeGenaro
Republican
Elected Justice
Melody J. Stewart
Democratic

Incumbent Associate Justice Mary DeGenaro, a Republican, sought a full-term after being appointed by Governor John Kasich, following the resignation of Justice William O' Neill, a Democrat.

==== Republican primary ====
===== Candidates =====
- Mary DeGenaro, incumbent associate justice of the Supreme Court of Ohio

===== Results =====
Republican primary results
Party	Candidate	Votes	%
Republican	Mary DeGenaro (incumbent)	581,244	100.0
Total votes		581,244	100.0

==== Democratic primary ====
===== Candidates =====
- Melody J. Stewart, incumbent judge of the Ohio Court of Appeals for the 8th District

===== Results =====
Democratic primary results
Party	Candidate	Votes	%
Democratic	Melody J. Stewart	500,084	100.0%
Total votes		500,084	100.0%

==== General election ====
===== Results =====
2018 Ohio Supreme Court Associate Justice (term commencing 01/02/2019) election
Party	Candidate	Votes	%
Nonpartisan	Melody J. Stewart	1,853,418	52.64%
Nonpartisan	Mary DeGenaro (incumbent)	1,667,258	47.36%
Total votes		3,520,676	100.0%
Democratic gain from Republican			

== Court of Appeals ==
The Ohio District Courts of Appeals consists of 69 judges in 12 districts. Judges serve a six-year term. Approximately 1/3 of these positions were up for election in 2018.

=== District 1 ===
==== Term commencing 02/09/2019 ====
2018 Ohio Court of Appeals 1st District (term commencing 02/09/2019) election
Party	Candidate	Votes	%
Nonpartisan	Pierre Bergeron	146,560	51.56%
Nonpartisan	Charles Miller (incumbent)	137,664	48.44%
Total votes		284,224	100.0%
Democratic gain from Republican			

==== Term commencing 02/10/2019 ====
2018 Ohio Court of Appeals 1st District (term commencing 02/10/2019) election
Party	Candidate	Votes	%
Nonpartisan	Marilyn Zayas (incumbent)	175,094	60.42%
Nonpartisan	Dale Stalf	114,704	39.58%
Total votes		289,798	100.0%
Democratic hold			

==== Term commencing 02/11/2019 ====
2018 Ohio Court of Appeals 1st District (term commencing 02/11/2019) election
Party	Candidate	Votes	%
Nonpartisan	Candace Crouse	159,122	53.27%
Nonpartisan	Dennis Deters (incumbent)	139,570	46.73%
Total votes		298,692	100.0%
Democratic gain from Republican			

==== Term commencing 02/12/2019 ====
2018 Ohio Court of Appeals 1st District (term commencing 02/12/2019) election
Party	Candidate	Votes	%
Nonpartisan	Robert C. Winkler	154,546	51.47%
Nonpartisan	Ginger Bock	145,695	48.53%
Total votes		300,241	100.0%
Republican hold			

=== District 2 ===
==== Term commencing 02/09/2019 ====
2018 Ohio Court of Appeals 2nd District (term commencing 02/09/2019)
Party	Candidate	Votes	%
Nonpartisan	Jeffrey M. Welbaum (incumbent)	259,674	100.0%
Total votes		259,674	100.0%
Republican hold			

=== District 3 ===
==== Term commencing 02/09/2019 ====
2018 Ohio Court of Appeals 3rd District (term commencing 02/09/2019)
Party	Candidate	Votes	%
Nonpartisan	John R. Williamowksi (incumbent)	201,757	100.0%
Total votes		201,757	100.0%
Republican hold			

=== District 4 ===
==== Term commencing 02/09/2019 ====
2018 Ohio Court of Appeals 4th District (term commencing 02/09/2019)
Party	Candidate	Votes	%
Nonpartisan	Jason P. Smith	86,992	52.7
Nonpartisan	Marie Hoover (incumbent)	78,092	47.3
Total votes		165,084	100.0%
Republican gain from Democratic			

==== Term commencing 02/10/2019 ====
2018 Ohio Court of Appeals 4th District (term commencing 02/10/2019)
Party	Candidate	Votes	%
Nonpartisan	Mike Hess	102,284	61.06%
Nonpartisan	Valarie K. Gerlach	65,229	38.94%
Total votes		167,513	100.0%
Republican hold			

=== District 5 ===
==== Term commencing 02/09/2019 ====
2018 Ohio Court of Appeals 5th District (term commencing 02/09/2019) election
Party	Candidate	Votes	%
Nonpartisan	John W. Wise (incumbent)	372,384	100.0%
Total votes		372,384	100.0%
Republican hold			

==== Term commencing 02/10/2019 ====
2018 Ohio Court of Appeals 5th District (term commencing 02/10/2019) election
Party	Candidate	Votes	%
Nonpartisan	Scott Gwin (incumbent)	358,832	100.0%
Total votes		358,832	100.0%
Democratic hold			

==== Term commencing 02/11/2019 ====
2018 Ohio Court of Appeals 5th District (term commencing 02/11/2019) election
Party	Candidate	Votes	%
Nonpartisan	Patricia A. Delaney (incumbent)	254,699	59.52%
Nonpartisan	Andrew King	173,237	40.48%
Total votes		427,936	100.0%
Democratic hold			

=== District 6 ===
==== Term commencing 02/09/2019 ====
2018 Ohio Court of Appeals 6th District (term commencing 02/09/2019) election
Party	Candidate	Votes	%
Nonpartisan	Gene A. Zmuda	144,884	55.41%
Nonpartisan	Joel M. Kuhlman	116,577	44.59%
Total votes		261,461	100.0%
Republican hold			

=== District 7 ===
==== Term commencing 02/09/2019 ====
2018 Ohio Court of Appeals 7th District (term commencing 02/09/2019) election
Party	Candidate	Votes	%
Nonpartisan	David A. D'Apolito	88,253	51.11%
Nonpartisan	Kathleen Bartlett	84,409	48.89%
Total votes		172,662	100.0%
Democratic gain from Republican			

=== District 8 ===
==== Term commencing 01/01/2019 ====
2018 Ohio Court of Appeals 8th District (term commencing 01/01/2019) election
Party	Candidate	Votes	%
Nonpartisan	Frank D. Celebrezze Jr (incumbent)	276,766	100.0%
Total votes		276,766	100.0%
Democratic hold			

==== Term commencing 01/02/2019 ====
2018 Ohio Court of Appeals 8th District (term commencing 01/02/2019) election
Party	Candidate	Votes	%
Nonpartisan	Michelle J. Sheehan	281,204	74.17%
Nonpartisan	Raymond C. Headen	97,916	25.83%
Total votes		379,120	100.0%
Democratic hold			

==== Term commencing 01/03/2019 ====
2018 Ohio Court of Appeals 8th District (term commencing 01/03/2019) election
Party	Candidate	Votes	%
Nonpartisan	Eileen T. Gallagher (incumbent)	275,986	100.0%
Total votes		275,986	100.0%
Democratic hold			

==== Term commencing 02/09/2019 ====
2018 Ohio Court of Appeals 8th District (term commencing 02/09/2019) election
Party	Candidate	Votes	%
Nonpartisan	Mary J. Boyle (incumbent)	274,395	100.0%
Total votes		274,395	100.0%
Democratic hold			

=== District 9 ===
==== Term commencing 02/09/2019 ====
2018 Ohio Court of Appeals 9th District (term commencing 02/09/2019) election
Party	Candidate	Votes	%
Nonpartisan	Jennifer Hensal (incumbent)	179,997	52.24%
Nonpartisan	Diana Colavecchio	164,567	47,76%
Total votes		344,564	100.0%
Republican hold			

=== District 10 ===
==== Term commencing 02/09/2019 ====
2018 Ohio Court of Appeals 10th District (term commencing 02/09/2019) election
Party	Candidate	Votes	%
Nonpartisan	Laurel Beatty Blunt	317,597	100.0%
Total votes		317,597	100.0%
Democratic hold			

==== Term commencing 02/10/2019 ====
2018 Ohio Court of Appeals 10th District (term commencing 02/10/2019) election
Party	Candidate	Votes	%
Nonpartisan	Betsy Luper Schuster (incumbent)	252,537	100.0%
Total votes		252,537	100.0%
Republican hold			

=== District 11 ===
==== Term commencing 02/09/2019 ====
2018 Ohio Court of Appeals 11th District (term commencing 02/09/2019) election
Party	Candidate	Votes	%
Nonpartisan	Matt Lynch	142,373	55.53%
Nonpartisan	Darya Klammer	114,022	44.47%
Total votes		256,395	100.0%
Republican hold			

==== Term commencing 02/10/2019 ====
2018 Ohio Court of Appeals 11th District (term commencing 02/10/2019) election
Party	Candidate	Votes	%
Nonpartisan	Mary Jane Trapp	134,620	53.84%
Nonpartisan	Casey O'Brien	115,425	46.16%
Total votes		250,045	100.0%
Democratic gain from Republican			

=== District 12 ===
==== Term commencing 02/09/2019 ====
2018 Ohio Court of Appeals 12th District (term commencing 02/09/2019) election
Party	Candidate	Votes	%
Nonpartisan	Stephen W. Powell (incumbent)	260,804	100.0%
Total votes		260,804	100.0%
Republican hold			

== State Board of Education ==
Ohio State Board of Education District 2
Candidate	Votes	%
Kirsten Hill	47,424	17.8
Jeanine Donaldson	46,341	17.4
Sue Larimer	42,867	16.1
Annette Shine	35,960	13.5
Vicki Donovan-Lyle	34,981	13.1
Charles Froehlich (incumbent)	30,864	11.6
W. Roger Knight	28,341	10.6
Total votes	266,778	100.0

Ohio State Board of Education District 3
Candidate	Votes	%
Charlotte McGuire (incumbent)	130,512	42.5
Dawn Wojcik	91,136	29.7
Matthew McGowan	85,673	27.9
Total votes	307,321	100.0

Ohio State Board of Education District 4
Candidate	Votes	%
Jenny Kilgore	179,765	50.4
Pat Bruns (incumbent)	176,894	49.6
Total votes	356,659	100.0

Ohio State Board of Education District 7
Candidate	Votes	%
Sarah Fowler (incumbent)	259,997	100.0

Ohio State Board of Education District 8
Candidate	Votes	%
John Hagan	128,854	42.0
Kathleen Purdy	101,706	33.2
Melissa Dahman	76,104	24.8
Total votes	306,664	100.0
