= Peter Beck (Ohio politician) =

American politician

Member of the Ohio House of Representatives from the 54th district
- In office September 20, 2009 – November 30, 2014 (resigned)
- Preceded by: Shannon Jones
- Succeeded by: Paul Zeltwanger

Personal details
- Born: December 11, 1952 (age 73) Butler, Pennsylvania
- Party: Republican
- Education: University of South Florida
- Profession: Auditor

Peter Beck (born 1952) is a former Republican member of the Ohio House of Representatives, representing the 54th District from 2009 to 2014.

== Career ==
A U.S. Marine Corps veteran and graduate of the University of South Florida, Beck was the audit manager for the firm Donohoo, Cupp & Beck until he left in 2012. Prior to his service in the House, Beck served as Mason's mayor from 2003 to 2005 and served on Mason City Council from 1999 to 2003.

== Ohio House of Representatives ==
When Representative Shannon Jones vacated her seat to take Bob Schuler's seat in the Ohio Senate, Beck announced his plans to seek an appointment to the vacant house seat. He was up against Lebanon City Councilman Jeffrey Monroe and law clerk Michael Eshleman. Ultimately, he was chosen for the appointment, and was seated on October 6, 2009.

In his first election bid, Beck easily won a full term with 70.74% of the vote over Libertarian Robert Waters and Democrat Anne Howard. He was sworn into his first full term on January 3, 2011, and serves on the committees of Economic and Small Business Development; Finance and Appropriations and its Transportation Subcommittee; Public Utilities; and Ways and Means (as Chairman). He also is a member of the Correctional Institution Inspection Committee; and the Warren County Transportation Improvement District board of trustees.

Beck won a second term in 2012 unopposed.

== Conviction ==
On July 19, 2013, Beck was indicted on 16 counts of securities fraud and theft for his alleged role in the now-defunct company Christopher Technologies, a company that sold early warning software. He was allegedly the chief financial officer. The charges claimed Beck cheated investors out of about $200,000 related to his role in the former tech company. His former business partner, John W. Fussner, faced seven securities fraud and theft charges. Fussner was president of the former company. Beck's attorney had requested an extension after the Ohio Attorney General and the Hamilton County Prosecutor's Office, who jointly prosecuted the case, entered 60,000 pages worth of discovery documents into the record.

Ohio Speaker of the House William Batchelder and the Ohio Republican Party Chair Matt Borges asked Beck to resign his seat in the Statehouse. He refused. His seat was won in the November 2014 general election by Republican Paul Zeltwanger, who received 72% of the vote. Beck resigned on November 30, 2014, one month prior to the expiration of his term.

Beck was found guilty on June 2, 2015, on 13 criminal counts (three theft counts, three securities-related counts and seven perjury counts) by Hamilton County Common Pleas Court Judge John Andrew West. He was sentenced on August 20, 2015, to four years in prison. An appeal is to be filed.

A civil suit, filed in January 2013, was delayed until after the criminal trial. The civil suit, in which Beck is being defended by Warren County attorney Konrad Kircher, claims Beck and others bilked investors in Christopher Technologies out of $1.2 million. Fussner was not named in the civil case.

In May 2014, Beck lost his reelection bid during the state primaries to local businessman Paul Zeltwanger. Beck only accumulated 9% of the votes cast while opponents Paul Zeltwanger and Mary Jo Kubicki acquired 51% and 40%, respectively.
