= Shannon Jones =

American politician

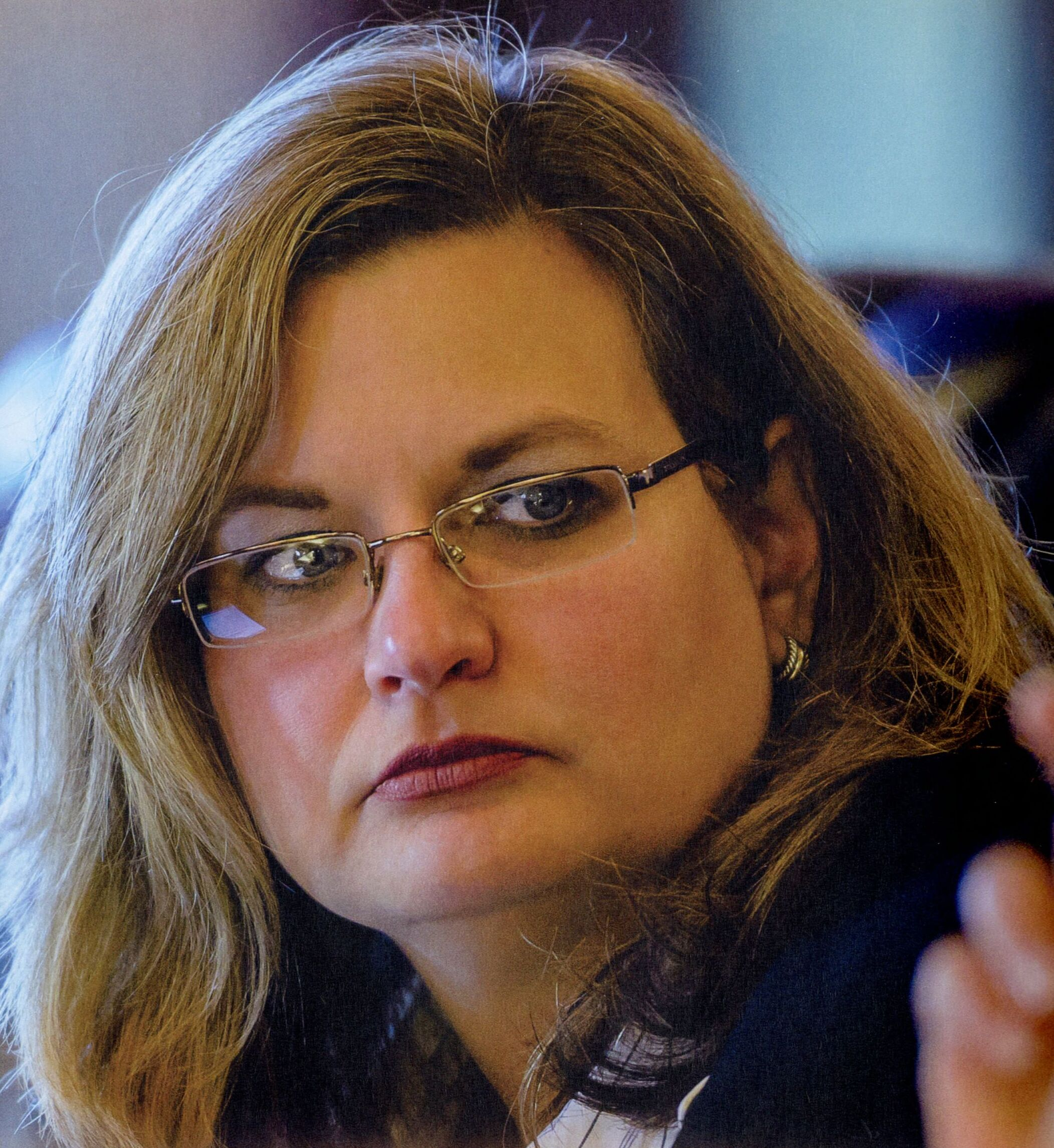

Member of the Ohio Senate from the 7th district
- In office August 11, 2009 – December 31, 2016
- Preceded by: Bob Schuler
- Succeeded by: Steve Wilson

Member of the Ohio House of Representatives from the 67th district
- In office January 2, 2007 – August 10, 2009
- Preceded by: Tom Raga
- Succeeded by: Peter Beck

Personal details
- Born: Cincinnati, Ohio, U.S.
- Party: Republican
- Spouse: Russell Jones
- Education: University of Cincinnati
- Profession: County Commissioner (Warren, OH); Executive Director, Groundwork Ohio

Shannon Jones is an American politician from the state of Ohio. A Republican, she was a member of the Ohio House of Representatives from 2007 to 2009 and a member of the Ohio Senate (representing the 7th District) from 2009 to 2016. She was the Executive Director of Groundwork Ohio from 2016 to 2024, and is currently a county commissioner in Warren County, Ohio.

== Early life and career ==
A graduate of the University of Cincinnati with a Bachelor of Arts in Communications, Jones worked as chief of staff for Congressman Steve Chabot, as a regional representative for then State Treasurer Joe Deters, and as a district director for U.S. Senator Mike DeWine. She also served as the Executive Director of the Hamilton County Republican Party and as the campaign manager on the Congressional campaigns of Chabot and Mike Turner.

== Ohio House of Representatives ==
When incumbent Tom Raga was tapped by Ken Blackwell to run for Lieutenant Governor, Jones was mentioned as a potential replacement for his seat in the Ohio House of Representatives, and she eventually declared her candidacy. In the heavily Republican district, Jones won easily in 2006, and reelection in 2008. She served as House Assistant Majority Whip for the 127th General Assembly.

== Ohio Senate ==
=== Appointment and elections ===
Bob Schuler, who had held the 7th Senate District since 2003, was unable to run again in 2010. Jones and former Representative Michelle Schneider both sought to replace him. However, Schuler died in June 2009, almost a year before the 2010 primary. In August 2019, state Senate Republicans appointed Jones to fill the vacant Senate seat for the rest of the term. Ohio Senate District 7 is a heavily Republican county, composed mostly of Warren County with some parts in Hamilton and Butler counties. In the May 2010 Republican primary, Jones won the nomination with 23,316 votes (61%), defeating Schneider, who received 14,986 votes (39%). In the November 2010 general election, Jones won with 71.85% of the vote, defeating Democratic nominee Sam Pettinichi, who received 28.15% of the vote. She won re-election unopposed in 2014 after the Democratic candidate withdrew from the race.

=== Tenure and legislation ===
For the 128th General Assembly, Jones was appointed Vice Chair of the Ways and Means and Economic Development Committee. She was also a member of the Insurance, Commerce and Labor, Government Oversight, and Health, Human Services and Aging Committee. She was also appointed to the newly formed, six-member Budget and Planning Commission.

For the 129th General Assembly, the Ohio Senate Republican Caucus chose Jones to serve as the Senate majority whip. Senate President Tom Niehaus also named Jones as a member of the Senate Rules and Reference Committee; Energy and Public Utilities Committee; Finance Committee (Vice Chair); Health, Human Services and Aging; and Insurance, Commerce and Labor. She also served as a member of the Controlling Board; the Joint Legislative Committee for Unified Long-Term Services and Supports; the Legislative Service Commission; and the Warren County Transportation Improvement District.

Jones introduced SB 5 in 2011, a bill that limited collective bargaining for Ohio state employees, such as public schoolteachers, police officers, firefighters, and prison guards. The bill was backed by the conservative advocacy group Americans for Prosperity. It passed the Ohio Senate on a 17–16 vote. The bill was signed into law by Republican Governor John Kasich, but was staunchly opposed by state employees' unions, and was overwhelmingly repealed by voters in Issue 2, a veto referendum.

Jones was also known as the primary sponsor of Ohio legislation that requires young children to be properly restrained in a booster seat when riding in cars; that legislation went into effect in 2009.

Jones sponsored legislation to reduce Ohio's high infant mortality rate, specifically Senate Bill 332, which passed the state Senate in 2016 on a 29–1 vote. She co-chaired the 15-member Ohio Commission on Infant Mortality.

== Career after state Senate ==
Jones supported John Kasich's campaign for the 2016 Republican nomination for President. After Donald Trump became the presumptive Republican nominee, then-State Senator Jones resigned as a delegate to the Ohio State Republican Convention rather than back Trump, explaining that her fundamental values precluded her from supporting Trump and calling herself as a "conscientious objector" to Trump's nomination. She also opposed Trump's 2020 re-election campaign.

In December 2015, Jones announced her intent to run for a county commission seat in Warren County, leaving her state Senate seat. Jones was succeeded in her Senate seat by Steve Wilson. She won election to the county commission in 2016 and resigned her Senate seat with two years left in her term. The county is Republican-dominated. She won reelection in 2020, and was unopposed in both the primary and the general election.

In 2017, Shannon became executive director of Groundwork Ohio, a nonprofit advocacy organization in Columbus, Ohio that advocates for children. In June 2024, she left that position, transitioning to a strategic advisory role through the end of the 2024.
