= Michelle Schneider =

Michelle Schneider may refer to:

- Michelle Englot (born 1964), Canadian curler from Regina, Saskatchewan
- Michelle G. Schneider (born 1954), former Republican member of the Ohio House of Representatives
