= Ron Maag =

American politician

Member of the Ohio House of Representatives from the 62nd district
- In office January 7, 2013 – December 31, 2016
- Preceded by: Lorraine Fende
- Succeeded by: Scott Lipps

Member of the Ohio House of Representatives from the 35th district
- In office January 5, 2009 – January 7, 2013
- Preceded by: Michelle G. Schneider
- Succeeded by: Zack Milkovich

Personal details
- Born: 1945 (age 80–81) Cincinnati, Ohio, U.S.
- Party: Republican
- Education: University of Cincinnati
- Profession: Sales

Ron Maag (born 1945) is a former Republican member of the Ohio House of Representatives, serving in the House from 2009 to 2016.

== Career ==
After graduation from the University of Cincinnati, Maag went on to work for Bristol-Myers Squibb Company. He also served as a board member with the Warren County Farm Bureau.

== Ohio House of Representatives ==
With incumbent Michelle Schneider unable to run due to term limits, Maag was one of three who sought to replace her. He ended up winning the primary with about 40% of the electorate. Because of no Democrat being fielded for the 35th District in 2008, Maag was uncontested in the general election.

In his first reelection bid, Maag again faced primary opposition from fellow Republican Ginger Kubala, however was victorious by over 5,000 votes. He was easily reelected in the 2010 general election. Currently, Maag serves on the committees of Finance and Appropriations and its Primary and Secondary Education Subcommittee; State Government and Elections (as vice chair); Education; and Ways and Means. He also serves on the Warren County Transportation Improvement District Board of Trustees.

In 2012, Maag won a third term, now representing the 62nd district, with 71.05% of the vote over Democrat Mike Kassalen. He won a final term before facing term limits in 2014 with almost 72% of the vote.

== Initiatives and positions ==
In his first legislation of the new Assembly, Maag introduced a bill to address sexting.

Maag has also introduced a resolution to give Ohioans an opportunity to weigh in on the federal health care law, and specify their thoughts about health care issues.
