= Steve LaTourette =

American politician (1954–2016)

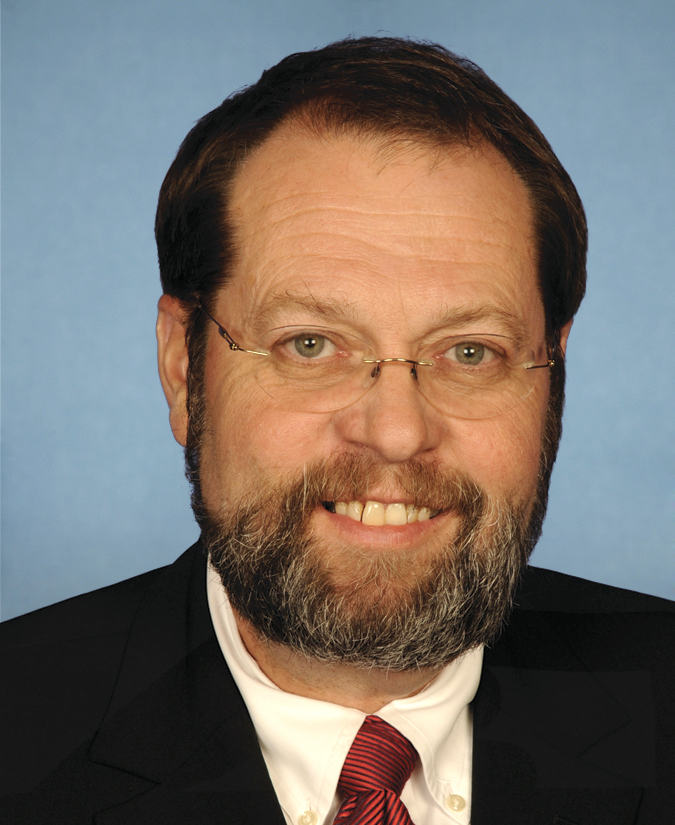

Member of the U.S. House of Representatives from Ohio
- In office January 3, 1995 – January 3, 2013
- Preceded by: Eric Fingerhut
- Succeeded by: David Joyce
- Constituency: 19th district (1995–2003); 14th district (2003–2013)

Personal details
- Born: Steven Clare LaTourette; July 22, 1954 Cleveland, Ohio, U.S.
- Died: August 3, 2016 (aged 62) McLean, Virginia, U.S.
- Party: Republican
- Spouse(s): Susan LaTourette (1982–2003); Jennifer Laptook (2003–2016)
- Children: 6, including Sarah
- Education: University of Michigan, Ann Arbor (BA); Cleveland State University (JD)
- Steve LaTourette's voice LaTourette speaks on increasing funding for Amtrak; Recorded June 29, 2005

Steven Clare LaTourette (July 22, 1954 – August 3, 2016) was an American politician who served as the U.S. representative for Ohio's 19th congressional district and then Ohio's 14th congressional district from 1995 to 2013. He was a member of the Republican Party. On July 30, 2012, it was reported that he would retire at the end of his term and not seek re-election. He subsequently co-founded a lobbying firm.

== Early life, education and career ==
LaTourette was born in Cleveland, Ohio, the son of Patricia Munn and Eugene LaTourette, an accountant. The LaTourette family were French Huguenots who fled persecution in the 1600s and first settled in Staten Island, New York.

A graduate of Cleveland Heights High School (1972) and the University of Michigan, LaTourette studied law at the Cleveland State University College of Law.

After a stint as a public defender, LaTourette was elected the County Prosecutor of Lake County, Ohio, and served from 1989 to 1995. There, he made his name prosecuting the Kirtland mass murders that were organized by mass-murderer and self-proclaimed prophet, Jeffrey Lundgren.

== U.S. House of Representatives ==
=== Committee assignments ===
- Committee on Appropriations
  - Subcommittee on Interior, Environment, and Related Agencies
  - Subcommittee on Legislative Branch
  - Subcommittee on Transportation, Housing and Urban Development, and Related Agencies (Vice Chair)

LaTourette was a member of the Republican Main Street Partnership. In 2006, LaTourette co-authored the Financial Data Protection Act of 2006, which sought to unify state and federal laws on banking and privacy and ease the burden of patchwork legislation.

=== Positions ===
In 1997, LaTourette sponsored H.R. 1151, a law that among other things exempted credit unions chartered for the purpose of making, or had a history of primarily making, member business loans, from certain regulatory restrictions. The effect of the deregulatory change was to increase risky lending to taxi companies, helping temporarily drive up the price of taxi licenses before eventually resulting in large credit union losses and hundreds of bankruptcies.

LaTourette had voted to impeach Bill Clinton for the Lewinsky scandal while he himself was having a long-term affair with his chief of staff, Jennifer Laptook.

On Thursday, March 17, 2011, LaTourette became one of only seven Republicans who voted "NO" on a measure introduced in the US House of Representatives to strip all government funding from NPR.

In a meeting with transit advocates, LaTourette disparaged fellow legislators, referring to them as "knuckledraggers that came in during the last election that hate taxes" and are reluctant even to consider raising revenues as part of a compromise to extend the debt ceiling.

On June 28, 2012, LaTourette was one of only two Republicans (along with Scott Rigell of Virginia) who voted against a motion to hold Attorney General Eric Holder in criminal contempt of Congress, though he did vote to bring civil charges against Holder for his handling of the Fast and Furious gunrunning scandal.

== Political campaigns ==
=== 1994 ===
LaTourette was elected to the House in 1994 in the wave of Republican successes in that year, defeating incumbent Eric Fingerhut. LaTourette served the 19th district of Ohio from 1995 to 2003. After another district was eliminated in the round of redistricting following the 2000 Census, LaTourette's district was renumbered to the 14th district of Ohio, where he represented the eastern suburbs of Cleveland, northeastern Summit County, northern Trumbull County, northern Portage County, Ashtabula County, Lake County, and Geauga County.

=== 2010 ===
LaTourette defeated Democratic nominee and former Appellate Court judge Bill O'Neill in the general election, along with Libertarian nominee and accountant John Jelenic.

=== 2012 ===
On July 30, 2012, it was reported that LaTourette would retire at the end of his term and not seek re-election.

== Electoral history ==
Ohio's 19th congressional district: Results 1994–2000
| Year | Republican | Votes | Pct | Democratic | Votes | Pct | 3rd Party | Party | Votes | Pct | 3rd Party | Party | Votes | Pct |
|---|---|---|---|---|---|---|---|---|---|---|---|---|---|---|
| 1994 | Steven C. LaTourette | 99,997 | 48% | Eric Fingerhut | 89,701 | 43% | Ronald Young | Independent | 11,364 | 6% | Jerome Brentar | Independent | 5,180 | 3% |
| 1996 | Steven C. LaTourette | 135,012 | 55% | Thomas Coyne Jr. | 101,152 | 41% | Thomas Martin | Natural Law | 10,655 | 4% | | | | |
| 1998 | Steven C. LaTourette | 126,786 | 66% | Elizabeth Kelley | 64,090 | 34% | | | | | | | | |
| 2000 | Steven C. LaTourette | 206,639 | 65% | Dale V. Blanchard | 101,842 | 32% | Sid Stone | Libertarian | 10,367 | 3% | | | | |

Ohio's 14th congressional district: Results 2002–2006
| Year | Republican | Votes | Pct | Democratic | Votes | Pct | | 3rd Party | Party | Votes | Pct |
|---|---|---|---|---|---|---|---|---|---|---|---|
| 2002 | Steven C. LaTourette | 134,413 | 72% | Dale V. Blanchard | 51,846 | 28% | * | | | | |
| 2004 | Steven C. LaTourette | 201,652 | 63% | Capri Cafaro | 119,714 | 37% | | | | | |
| 2006 | Steven C. LaTourette | 144,069 | 58% | Lewis R. Katz | 97,753 | 39% | | Werner J. Lange | Nonpartisan | 8,500 | 3% |
| 2008 | Steven C. LaTourette | 188,488 | 58% | William O'Neill | 125,214 | 39% | | David Macko | Libertarian | 9,511 | 3% |
| 2010 | Steven C. LaTourette | 149,878 | 65% | William O'Neill | 72,604 | 31% | | John Jelenic | Libertarian | 8,383 | 4% |

Write-in and minor candidate notes: In 2002, Sid Stone received 113 votes.

== Post-congressional career ==
LaTourette established a Super PAC, Defending Main Street. The PAC was created to curb the influence of the Tea Party movement in the Republican Party.

Despite his previous opposition to same-sex marriage, in 2015, LaTourette signed a Supreme Court brief to support the overturn of state bans on the practice.

== Illness and death ==
In mid-2014 LaTourette discovered that he had pancreatic cancer. Consequently, he filed a claim in May 2015 against the Office of the Attending Physician of the United States Congress citing a lack of information in that regard when he was observed earlier. LaTourette died on August 3, 2016, from pancreatic cancer, aged 62.

== See also ==
- Ohio's 19th congressional district
- Ohio's 14th congressional district
- List of federal political sex scandals in the United States
- List of United States representatives from Ohio

U.S. House of Representatives
| Preceded by Eric Fingerhut | Member of the U.S. House of Representatives from Ohio's 19th congressional district 1995–2003 | Constituency abolished |
| Preceded by Tom Sawyer | Member of the U.S. House of Representatives from Ohio's 14th congressional district 2003–2013 | Succeeded by David Joyce |
