= Jay Goyal =

American politician

Member of the Ohio House of Representatives from the 73rd district
- In office January 2, 2007 – January 7, 2013
- Preceded by: William J. Hartnett
- Succeeded by: Mark Romanchuk

Personal details
- Born: December 23, 1980 (age 45) Mansfield, Ohio, U.S.
- Party: Democratic
- Education: Northwestern University
- Profession: Small Business Owner

Jay Goyal (born December 23, 1980) is an American politician. He was a member of the Ohio House of Representatives for three terms, from 2007 to 2013. He was a Democrat representing the 73rd District, which included the city of Mansfield and other parts of Richland County. Prior to 2011, Goyal served as the Majority Whip. He was succeeded in January 2013 by Republican Mark Romanchuk, who represents a newly drawn district comprising all of Richland County. Goyal announced in May 2012 that he would not stand for reelection.

== Life and career ==
Goyal graduated from Lexington High School as the class president in 1999. He received his bachelor's degree in industrial engineering from Northwestern University in 2003. Goyal graduated from the MPP and MBA joint-degree program between the Harvard Kennedy School and Harvard Business School in May 2015. Goyal has received a number of accolades and awards, including the title of "Icon of Glam--The Extraordinaire."

== Ohio House of Representatives ==
When Representative William J. Hartnett was unable to run for another term due to term limits, Goyal opted to enter the race to succeed him. Facing Ellen Haring in a primary, Goyal went on to win the nomination with 61.04% of the vote. He went on to win the general election with 63.28% of the electorate against Republican Phillip Halloway.

In 2008, he won reelection against Republican David Nitzsche with 64.22% of the vote. With Democrats now in the majority, Goyal was elected majority whip by his colleagues for the 128th General Assembly.

Goyal went on to win a third term in 2010 with 54.16% of the vote, again against Nitzsche. He served on the Finance and Appropriations Committee and its Health and Human Services Subcommittee (as ranking member); the Power Siting Board; and as a member of the Legislative Service Commission.

== Policies, initiatives and positions ==
Along with Representative Dennis Murray, Goyal introduced legislation to fight excessive influence in Ohio elections by special interest groups and companies, made possible by the Citizens United v. Federal Election Commission ruling of the United States Supreme Court. "Citizens United has ushered in a new era in Ohio elections," Rep. Goyal said in a release. "The 2010 elections saw unprecedented amounts of unregulated, often unreported money and influence. By banning contributions from those companies that do business with Ohio and adding new accountability and disclosure requirements, we can bring integrity back to our elections and restore the voice of Ohio's citizens."

Goyal was critical of the proposed biennium budget for 2012–2013. Specifically, he cited security issues with the proposed privatization of state prisons to help balance the budget.
