= Josh O'Farrell =

American politician

Member of the Ohio House of Representatives from the 96th district
- In office June 2, 2010 – December 31, 2010
- Preceded by: Allan Sayre
- Succeeded by: Al Landis

Personal details
- Born: August 24, 1981 (age 45) New Philadelphia, Ohio, U.S.
- Party: Democratic
- Education: University of Notre Dame; Wake Forest University
- Profession: Attorney

Joshua 'Josh' O'Farrell is the former Democratic representative for the 96th District of the Ohio House of Representatives. Following the resignation of Representative Allan Sayre in 2010, he was selected to serve the remainder of the term from a pool of five qualified candidates including O'Farrell, former Belmont County Commissioner Mark Thomas and Harrison County Commissioner Barbara Pincola. He was narrowly defeated in the 2010 general election and the 2012 general election by Al Landis.

He is the Democratic candidate for the 98th District of the Ohio House of Representatives, which encompasses all of Tuscarawas County and the majority of Holmes County.

== Career ==
O'Farrell is a 2000 graduate of New Philadelphia High School. He received his bachelor's degree from the University of Notre Dame, where he majored in history. He then went on to complete a Juris Doctor degree from Wake Forest University School of Law in 2010. O'Farrell was admitted to the Ohio Bar in 2010 and was also admitted to practice in the United States District Court for the Northern District of Ohio. He currently holds membership in the Tuscarawas County Bar Association, the Stark County Bar Association, the Ohio State Bar Association, and the Ohio Association of Justice.

O'Farrell is currently employed as an associate attorney by Tzangas, Plakas, Mannos Ltd. in Canton, Ohio. His experience and focus surrounds representing landowners throughout East Central and Northeast Ohio in oil and gas lease negotiations, pipeline right-of-way agreement negotiations, and in complex oil and gas litigation. O'Farrell also practices toxic torts and environmental litigation, commercial litigation, and professional negligence litigation.

== Ohio House of Representatives; 96th District ==
Josh O'Farrell was chosen by the Ohio House of Representatives Democratic Caucus to replace outgoing Representative Alan Sayre and was sworn into office on June 2, 2010. O'Farrell adjusted quickly to his new role as a member of the 128th Ohio General Assembly, and spent his first full day as a member of the Ohio House of Representatives in session until 4 a.m. the next day. Within weeks of taking office, O'Farrell responded to severe storms that battered the 96th District; surveying the damage alongside Sugarcreek, Ohio, Fire Chief Jim Harrison.

Representative O'Farrell was an active member of the Ohio House of Representatives; he introduced three bills during his six-month tenure and co-sponsored ten others. During his tenure, he served on the Agriculture and Natural Resources Committee, the Financial Institutions, Real Estate, and Securities Committee, the Rules and Reference Committee, and the State Government Committee.

=== Bills introduced ===
Bill number	Link	Description
H.B. 601	As Introduced	Deny tax breaks to companies that outsource jobs from the United States.
H.B. 604	As Introduced	Assist disabled veterans in obtaining specialty license plates.
H.B. 617	As Introduced	Promote job creation in the Ohio Appalachian Region.

Representative O'Farrell was the primary sponsor of three unique pieces of legislation during his shortened tenure as a member of the Ohio House of Representatives. With the introduction of H.B. 601, he sought to protect American jobs by amending the Ohio Revised Code to deny tax breaks and other incentives to businesses that outsource jobs outside of the United States. In H.B. 604, O'Farrell introduced a bill that would remove barriers to disabled Ohio veterans in receiving specialty license plates. Finally, with H.B. 617, O'Farrell introduced a bill that would provide tax and economic incentives to support job creation and capital investment in the Ohio Appalachian Region.

=== Bills co-sponsored ===
Bill number	Link	Description
Sub. S.B. 162	As Enrolled	Repeals the law governing alternative regulation of telephone companies.
Am. Sub. S.B. 232	As Enrolled	Tax incentives for companies that generate electricity from renewable energy resources, clean coal technology, advanced nuclear technology, and cogeneration technology.
Sub. S.B. 235	As Enrolled	Crackdown and extended penalties on human trafficking.
Am. Sub. H.B. 323	As Passed by the House	Permits the trial of a corporation (in absentia) in a criminal proceeding relative to a residential foreclosure action.
H.B. 560	As Introduced	Eliminate late fees for CDL's, motorcycle permits, and driver's licenses.
H.B. 571	As Introduced	Protected the Second Amendment rights of Ohioans by allowing those with a concealed carry license (who is an employee of a private employer) to store the employee's handgun in a locked vehicle parked on premises owned or leased by the employer.
H.B. 578	As Introduced	Adopt the Transfer of Adult Guardianship and Protective Proceedings Jurisdiction Act.
H.B. 587	As Introduced	Require county recorders to complete continuing education requirements.
H.B. 596	As Introduced	Expand the right of an institution of higher education to bring a civil action for damages caused by violations of athletic association or conference regulations.
H.B. 606	As Introduced	Allows the surviving spouse of a recipient of the Purple Heart to retain the Ohio Purple Heart license plates.

Representative O'Farrell additionally co-sponsored ten pieces of legislation during his time in the Ohio House of Representatives. Highlights from these endeavors include tax incentives for companies that undertake renewable energy solutions, a crackdown on human-trafficking, the protection of Second Amendment rights as it relates to conceal-carry license holders, and the expansion of rights for the families of wounded veterans.

=== 2010 election ===
Representative O'Farrell was challenged for his seat in the Ohio House of Representatives in the 2010 General Election by political newcomer Al Landis of Dover, Ohio. O'Farrell's campaign for reelection was carried out in a shortened time-frame, as he was forced to begin campaigning almost immediately after his appointment to the Ohio House of Representatives. Nevertheless, O'Farrell knocked on over 10,000 doors throughout the district leading up to the election.

County	Al Landis	Josh O'Farrell	O'Farrell difference
	Republican	Democrat	--
Belmont	5,822	5,200	-622
Harrison	2,604	2,998	394
Tuscarawas	12,407	11,788	-619
Total	20,833	19,986	-847
Percentage of votes	51.04%	48.96%	-2.08%

The November 2, 2010, general election saw O'Farrell narrowly defeated by Landis.

== Ohio House of Representatives; 98th District ==
=== Campaign ===
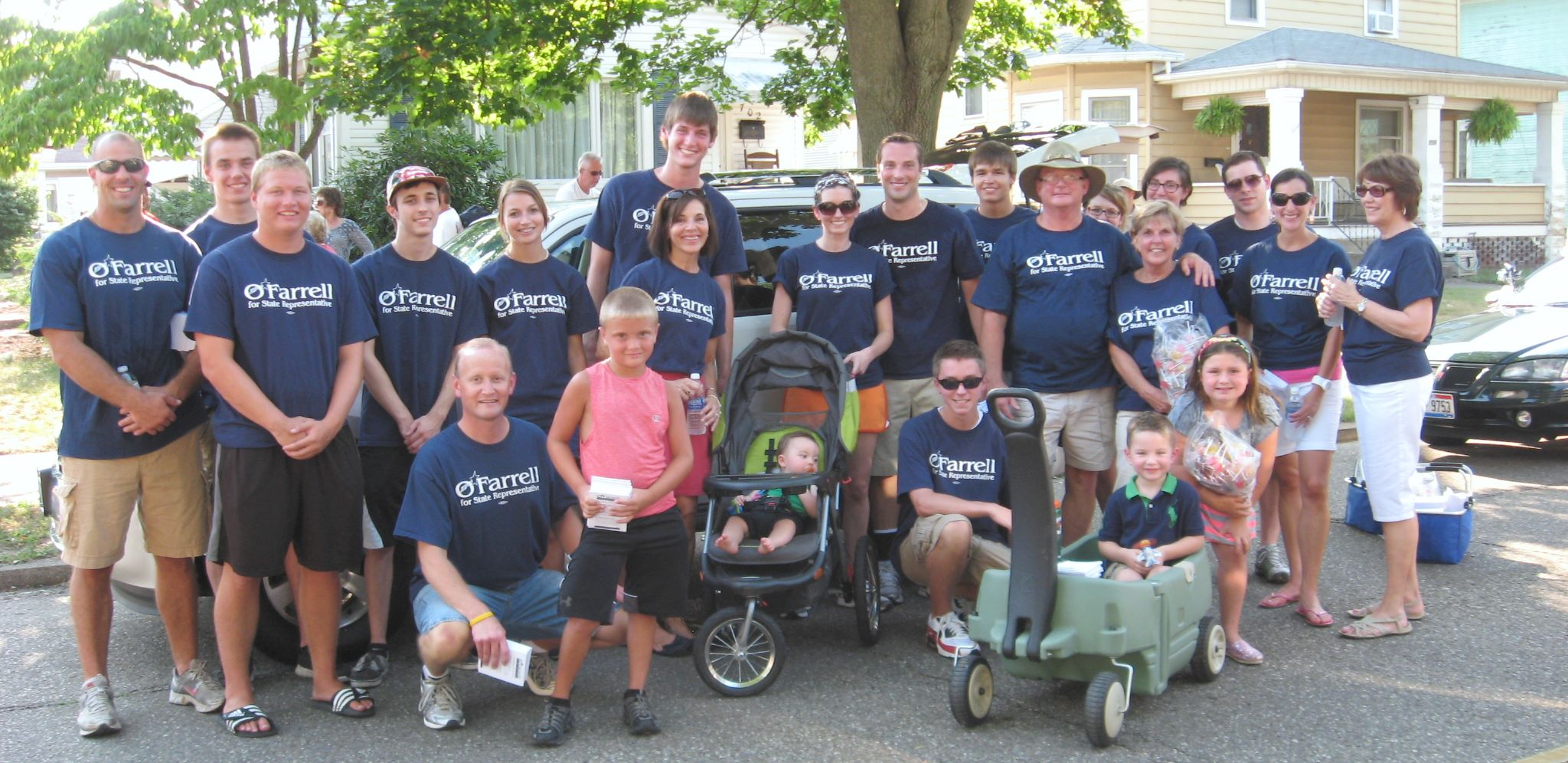
O'Farrell and volunteers at the New Philadelphia, Ohio First Town Days Parade.

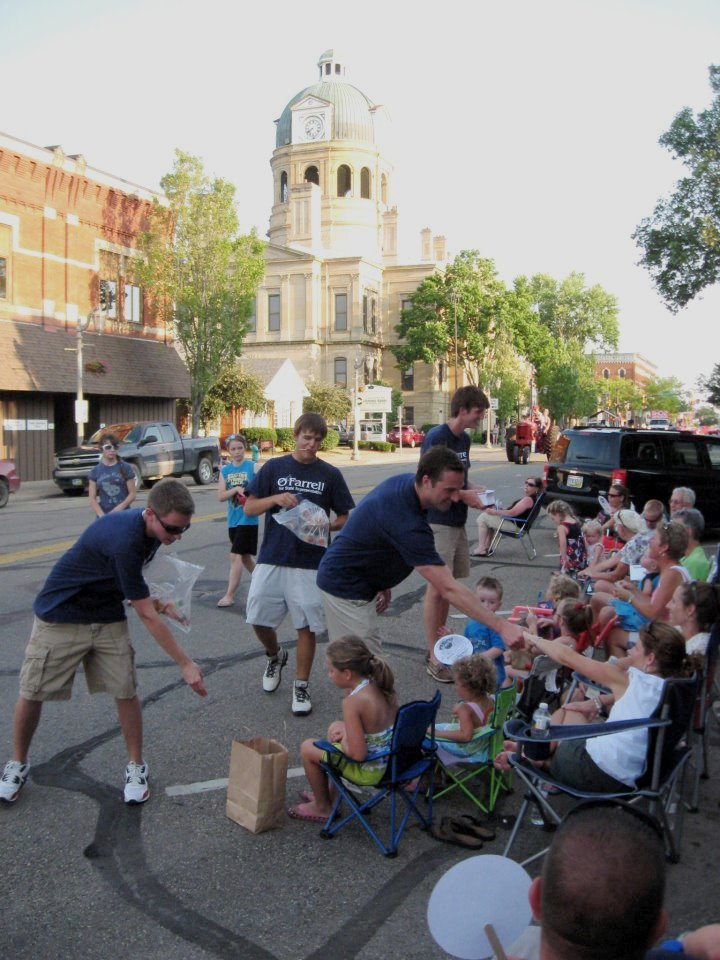
O'Farrell greets parade attendees in front of the Tuscarawas County Courthouse.

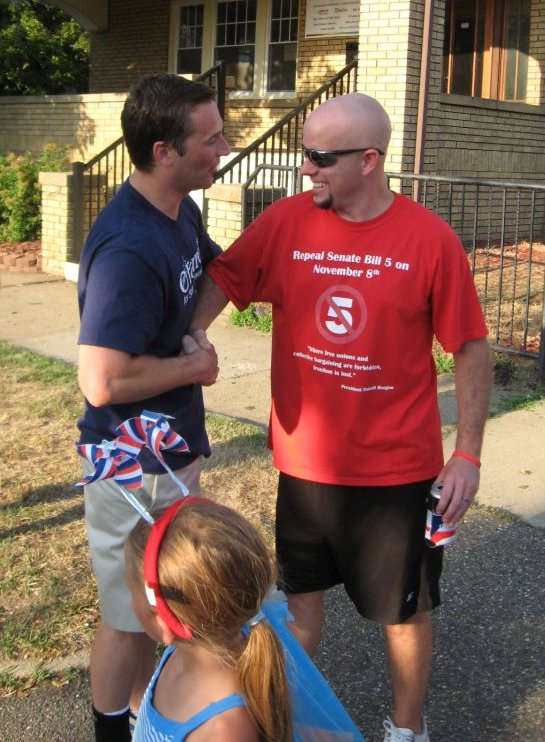
O'Farrell (left) speaks with a supporter.

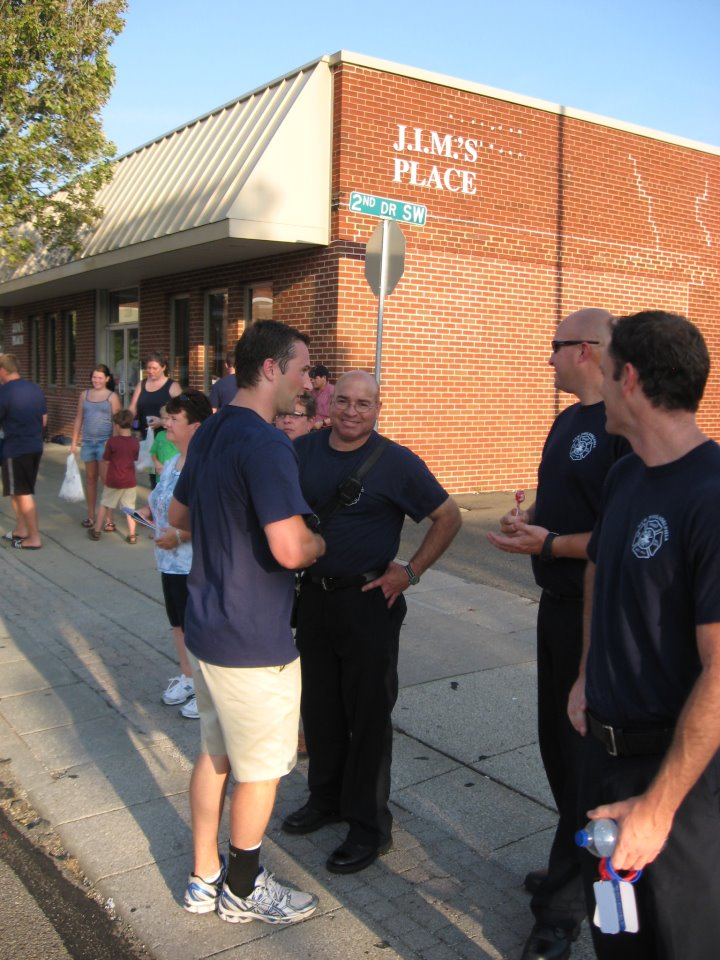
O'Farrell speaks with firefighters along a parade route.

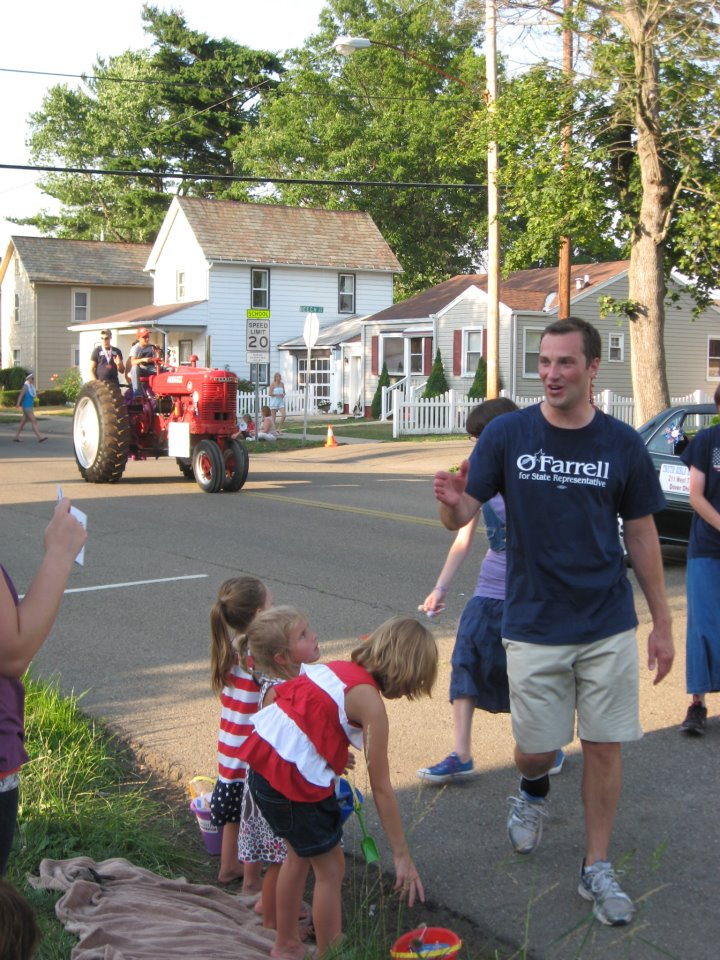
O'Farrell greets individuals while campaigning.

=== 2012 Election ===
==== Primary results ====
Josh O'Farrell was unopposed in his bid for the Democratic Nomination for the 98th District of the Ohio House of Representatives.

Candidate	Party	Notes	Votes	Percentage
Joshua O'Farrell	Democratic	Unopposed	2,682	100.00%

== Charitable Work & Philanthropy ==
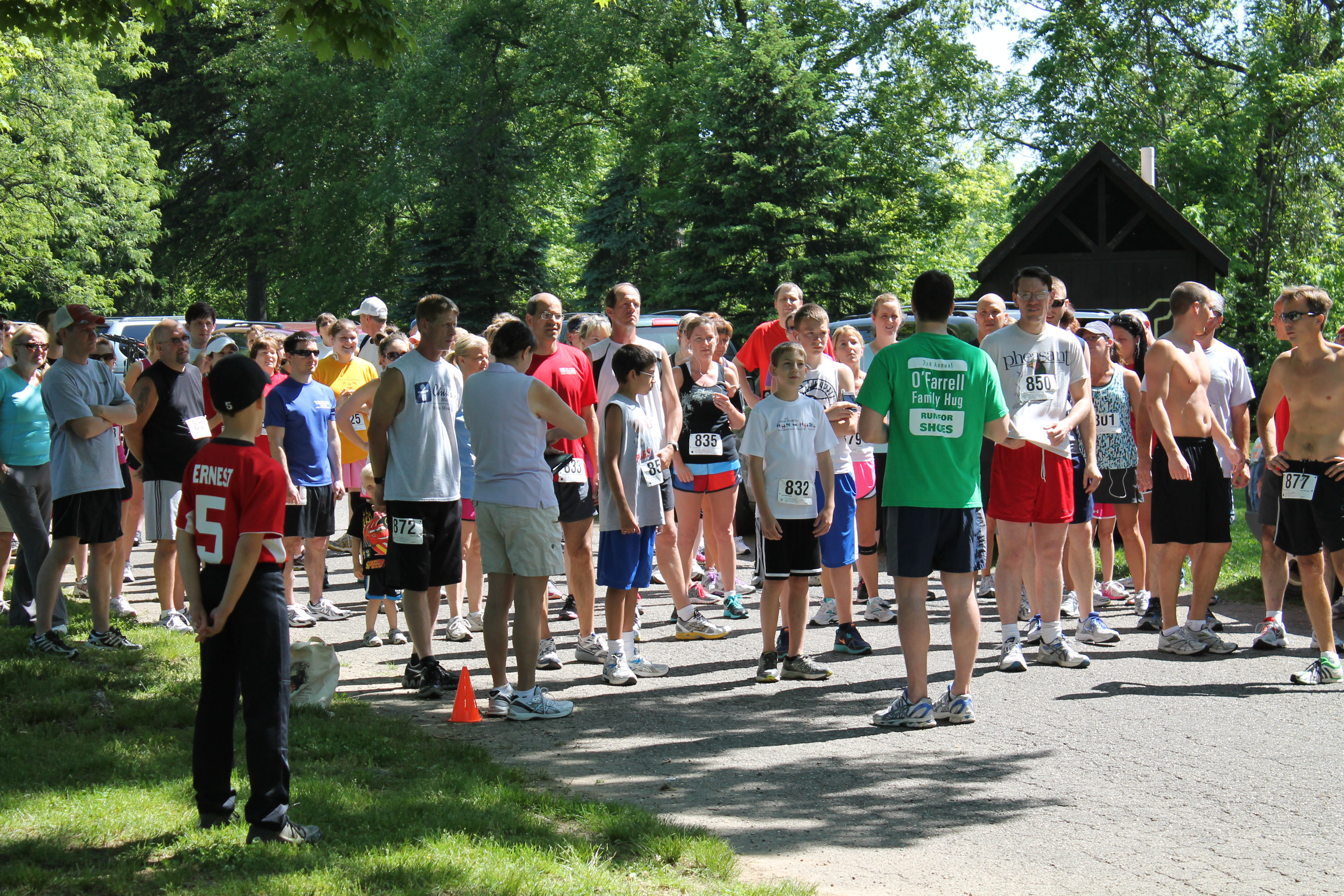
Josh O'Farrell (in green) instructing runners at the O'Farrell Family Hug Foundation's "Run for Shoes" event.

In early 2011, O'Farrell and his wife Christin founded the O'Farrell Family Hug Foundation. The nonprofit organization was established to provide charitable support to families within Tuscarawas County and the surrounding areas. The Foundation's goal is strengthen the local community by focusing on meeting the basic needs of children and families. The O'Farrell's organize and host numerous events and fundraisers annually to support and further the Foundation's mission.

On May 19, 2012, the Foundation held their 2nd Annual "Run for Shoes" event at Fort Laurens near Bolivar, Ohio. The event, which consisted of a 5K/1 Mile Walk/Children's "Fun Run," was deemed as extremely successful and helped raise the funds necessary to provide over 200 pairs of shoes to local children. The 2012 event marked an increase of the 125 pairs that were raised in the initial event a year prior. On June 30, 2012, a total of 136 of these shoes were distributed by Josh & Christin O'Farrell to families in need with the remainder of the raised funds being carried over to next year's event.

In 2011, the Foundation partnered with Adventure Harley-Davidson of Dover, Ohio to provide over 100 families with a Thanksgiving Day meal.

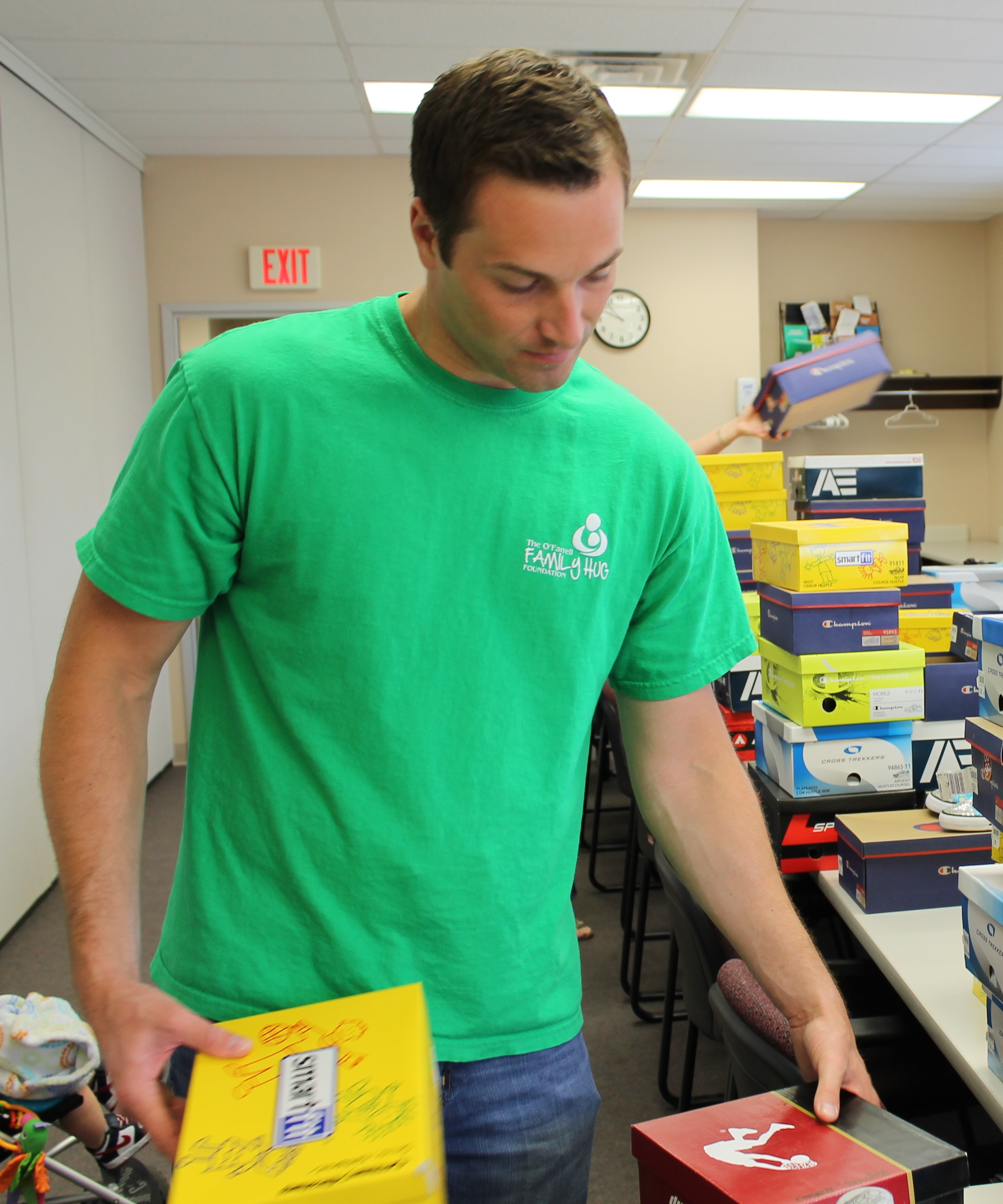
O'Farrell preparing shoes to be distributed to children in need.

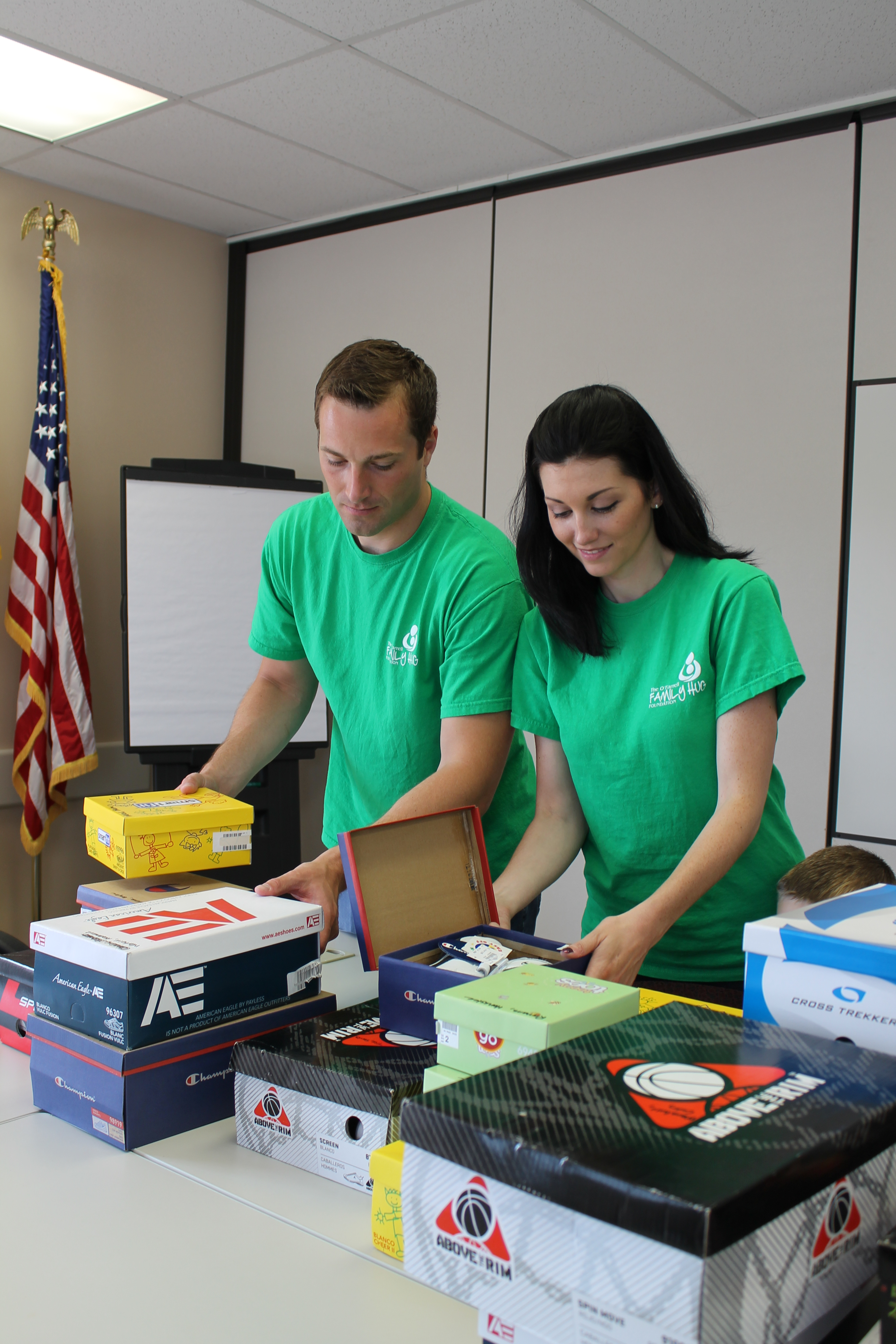
O'Farrell and wife Christin making final preparations for the O'Farrell Family Hug Foundation's 2012 shoe distribution event.

== Personal life ==
O'Farrell currently resides in New Philadelphia, Ohio with his wife Christin and their young sons Liam & Jameson. The family attends services at NewPointe Community Church in Dover, Ohio. He is the son of Tuscarawas County Common Pleas Court Judge Edward O'Farrell.
