= William O'Neill (Ohio judge) =

American judge

Bill O'Neill
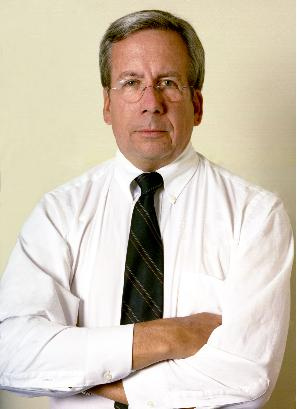

Justice of the Ohio Supreme Court
- In office January 2, 2013 – January 26, 2018
- Preceded by: Robert Cupp
- Succeeded by: Mary DeGenaro

Judge of the Ohio Eleventh District Court of Appeals
- In office February 9, 1997 – June 30, 2007
- Preceded by: Joseph E. Mahoney
- Succeeded by: Timothy P. Cannon

Personal details
- Born: William Michael O'Neill; May 6, 1947 (age 79) Cleveland, Ohio, U.S.
- Party: Democratic
- Education: Ohio University (BA); Cleveland State University (JD)

William Michael O'Neill (born May 6, 1947) is an American lawyer, judge and political figure. He was elected to the Ohio Supreme Court in 2012, for a term beginning January 2013. He served as an appellate judge on the Ohio Eleventh District Court of Appeals for 10 years. Twice, O'Neill was the Democratic nominee for U.S. Representative in Ohio's 14th congressional district. He announced on October 29, 2017, as a candidate for Ohio Governor in the 2018 election. On December 8, 2017, he announced he would resign from the Supreme Court on January 26, 2018.

== Education and military service ==
O'Neill graduated from Cleveland Heights High School in 1965 and Ohio University in 1969, at which point he joined the U.S. Army. He earned the Bronze Star in Vietnam and retired from the military in 2001 as a lieutenant colonel in the Ohio National Guard. With the help of the G.I. Bill, O'Neill graduated from the Cleveland State University College of Law in 1980. He also graduated from Huron School of Nursing as a registered nurse.

== Political campaigns ==
=== 1996 Ohio Court of Appeals campaign ===
In 1996, O'Neill won a seat on the Ohio Eleventh District Court of Appeals with about 50% of the vote. He served from 1997 to 2007, when he resigned to run for Congress.

=== 2004 Ohio Supreme Court campaign ===
In a 2004 special election to finish the term of an Ohio Supreme Court justice who resigned, O'Neill lost to Terrence O'Donnell by 21%.

Candidate	Party	Notes	Votes	Percentage
Terrence O'Donnell	Republican	Incumbent	2,560,609	60.50%
William O'Neill	Democratic		1,860,801	39.50%

=== 2006 Ohio Supreme Court campaign ===
In 2006, O'Neill ran against O'Donnell again for a full-term on the Ohio Supreme Court. O'Neill lost again, by over 17%.

Candidate	Party	Notes	Votes	Percentage
Terrence O'Donnell	Republican	Incumbent	1,903,702	58.67%
William O'Neill	Democratic		1,341,258	41.33%

=== 2008 Congressional campaign ===
O'Neill lost in his 2008 bid for Ohio's 14th congressional district seat to incumbent Steve LaTourette by nearly 20%.

Candidate	Party	Notes	Votes	Percentage
Steve LaTourette	Republican	Incumbent	188,488	58.32%
William O'Neill	Democratic		125,214	38.74%
David Macko	Libertarian		9,511	2.94%

- Race ranking and details from CQ Politics
- Campaign contributions from OpenSecrets

=== 2010 Congressional campaign ===
On February 6, 2010, O'Neill announced that he would be running again as the Democratic nominee for Ohio's 14th congressional district against LaTourette. O'Neill stated during his campaign his desire to expand the Greater Cleveland Rapid Transit rail system. O'Neill lost the election by over 33%.

Candidate	Party	Notes	Votes	Percentage
Steve LaTourette	Republican	Incumbent	149,878	64.92%
William O'Neill	Democratic		72,604	31.45%
John Jelenic	Libertarian		8,383	3.63%

=== 2012 Ohio Supreme Court campaign ===
In 2012, for the third time, O'Neill ran for the Ohio Supreme Court. He won a two-way primary against Fanon Rucker, a judge on the Hamilton County Municipal Court. O'Neill received 72% of the vote and carried all but one of Ohio's 88 counties. In the general election, O'Neill defeated incumbent Robert Cupp by four percent. O'Neill ran on a budget of just $4000 from his personal funds, a campaign he called "no money from nobody" and that was highlighted in a YouTube video with his twin sons.

Candidate	Party	Notes	Votes	Percentage
William O'Neill	Democratic		2,040,043	52%
Robert Cupp	Republican	Incumbent	1,860,801	48%

=== 2018 Ohio Gubernatorial campaign ===
On October 29, 2017, O'Neill announced that he would join the Democratic primary for Ohio governor. During his announcement, he laid out a platform of minimum wage increases, tax incentives for solar power, mental health care expansion and marijuana legalization in Ohio. Less than a week later he announced that he will recuse himself from new Supreme Court cases and will resign by the February 7, filing deadline due to potential ethical conflicts.

==== Controversy ====
On November 17, 2017, O'Neill stirred controversy by posting on Facebook regarding allegations of sexual assault against U.S. Senator Al Franken. He referred to those calling for Franken to resign as "dogs of war" and decried a "national feeding frenzy" against age-old sexual indiscretions. O'Neill went on to claim that he had been in sexual relationships with approximately fifty women. In response to these posts, his communications director resigned from his campaign. Multiple state officials, including Ohio Chief Justice Maureen O'Connor, former state representative and fellow gubernatorial candidate Connie Pillich, Dayton mayor and fellow gubernatorial candidate Nan Whaley, and Lieutenant Governor Mary Taylor, criticized O'Neill's comments, with Pillich and Whaley calling for him to resign from his position as justice. O'Neill initially called for his critics to "lighten up", saying that he intended to "elevate the discussion" on sexual assault. However, on November 19, he issued an apology for his remarks.

=== 2026 Congressional campaign ===
On June 25, 2025, O'Neill announced his intention to run for Ohio's 14th congressional district seat currently held by Congressman David Joyce.

== Professional life ==
O'Neill worked as a civil rights lawyer, small business owner, and union organizer. He is a registered nurse in the pediatric emergency department at Hillcrest Hospital in Mayfield Heights, Ohio. He is also an adoptive parent.

Legal offices
Preceded by Robert Cupp	Justice of the Ohio Supreme Court; 2013–2018	Succeeded by Mary DeGenaro
