= Jennifer Garrison =

American politician (born 1962)

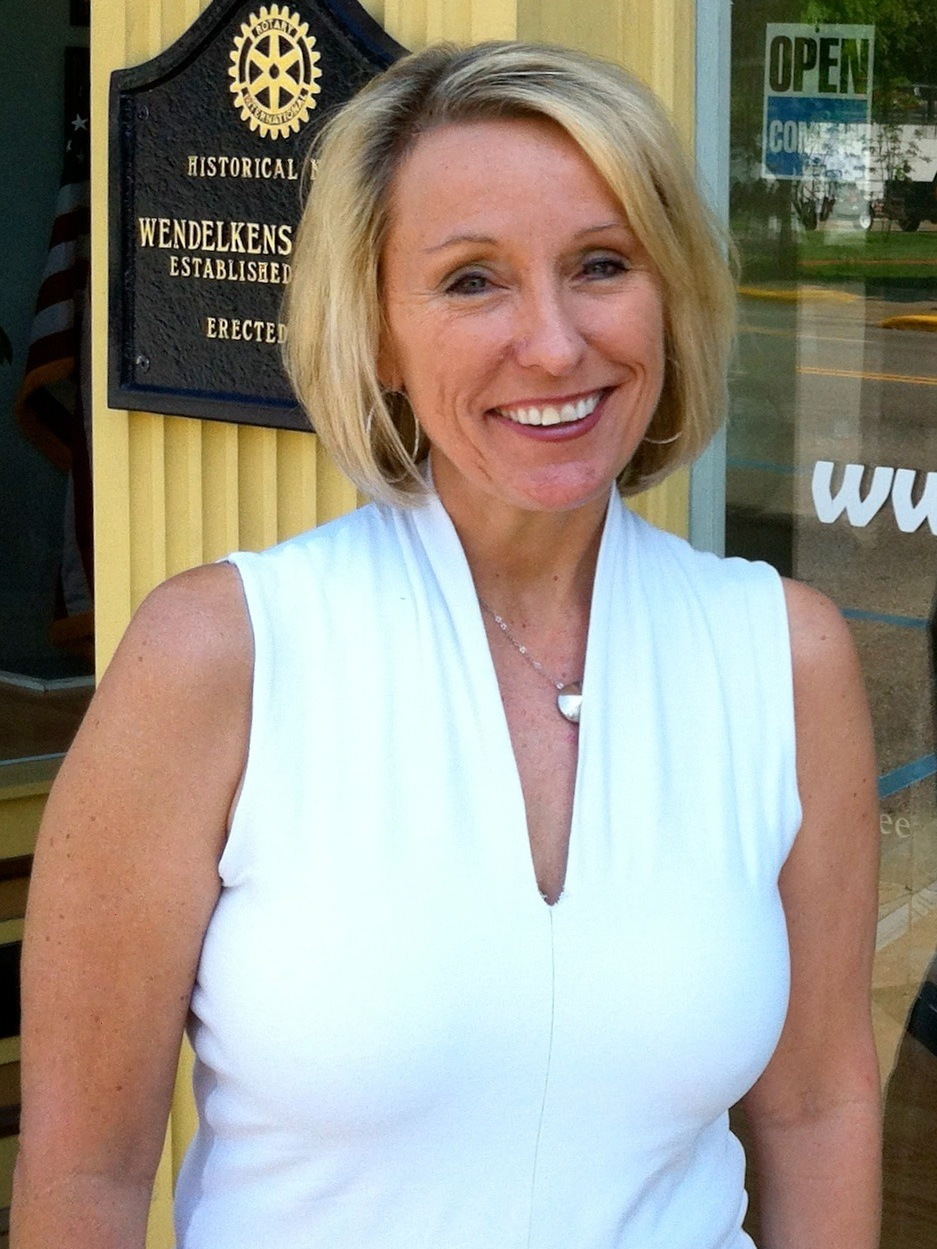
- Garrison in 2012

Member of the Ohio House of Representatives from the 93rd district
- In office January 5, 2005 – November 30, 2010
- Preceded by: Nancy P. Hollister
- Succeeded by: Larry Woodford

Personal details
- Born: April 2, 1962 (age 64) Fort Thomas, Kentucky
- Party: Democratic
- Education: Xavier University, Catholic University
- Profession: Attorney

Jennifer Garrison (born April 2, 1962) is an American politician of the Democratic party from Marietta, Ohio. From 2005 to 2010 she represented the 93rd District in the Ohio House of Representatives, which includes Guernsey, Monroe and Noble counties, most of Washington County, and part of Muskingum County, all in southeast Ohio.

On August 3, 2009, Garrison announced her candidacy for the Democratic nomination for Ohio Secretary of State. Garrison withdrew from the Ohio Secretary of State race in January 2010. She resigned from the State House in November 2010 to take the position of Commissioner of the Ohio State Employment Relations Board. Her nomination, a recess appointment by outgoing Democratic Governor Ted Strickland, was rejected by the Republican-majority Ohio Senate less than a month later. She declared her candidacy for Ohio's 6th congressional district in the 2014 election on 12 July 2013.

== Biography ==
Jennifer Garrison was born in Fort Thomas, Kentucky, the daughter of a union plumber. She earned a bachelor's degree in economics and business administration from Xavier University, and a J.D. degree from Catholic University Law School in Washington, D.C. While in college, she worked as an intern for the Congressional Budget Office, and for the Ohio Department of Transportation and Ohio Department of Natural Resources as a legislative assistant in Washington.

Garrison then completed a judicial clerkship in Philadelphia, Pennsylvania and became a practicing attorney. She moved to Marietta in 1990, joining the law firm of McCauley, Webster & Emrick, where she became a partner in 1993. Three years later, she opened a private law practice, concentrating on family mediation. She ran the Washington County Visitation Mediation Project for seven years, providing free mediation to parents working out their custody and visitation conflicts. She has served on the boards of the domestic violence shelter EVE and the Washington County Mental Health & Alcohol Addiction Board, and as Commissioner on the Marietta Civil Service Board.

Garrison is licensed to practice law in Ohio, Pennsylvania and West Virginia. She served as president of the Washington County, Ohio Bar Association from 1996 to 1997.

== Ohio House of Representatives ==
In 2004, Garrison beat incumbent representative Nancy P. Hollister with 51.6% of the vote. Garrison campaigned as a conservative Democrat who supported a constitutional amendment banning same sex marriages.

In 2006, Garrison was reelected with 71% of the vote against Republican challenger Donald J. Gadd, mayor of Byesville, Ohio. She served as Ranking Member of the Juvenile and Family Law Committee, and on the Education, Ranking Member on Public Utilities and Energy, and Finance and Appropriations Committees and the Primary and Secondary Education Subcommittee.

She won reelection in 2008 with 68% of the vote against Republican Wayne Smith. In 2009 she was elected by her peers as Majority Floor Leader in the Ohio House of Representatives.

In 2011, Garrison established the Southeastern Ohio Landowners Association (SEOLA), a not-for profit, association to assist mineral owners in the collective negotiation of oil and gas leases for the Marcellus and Utica Shale formations. As legal counsel for SEOLA, Garrison successfully negotiated leases on approximately 100,000 mineral acres in 13 lease transactions with 6 different companies. This work was recognized in the New York Times June 5, 2012 edition.

In 2014, Garrison ran unsuccessfully for the Ohio's 6th Congressional District Representative seat against incumbent Bill Johnson.
