= Todd Snitchler =

American attorney and lobbyist

Chair of the Public Utilities Commission of Ohio
- In office 2011–2014
- Governor: John Kasich
- Succeeded by: Alan Schreiber

Member of the Ohio House of Representatives from the 50th district
- In office January 2009 – February 2011
- Succeeded by: Christina Hagan

Personal details
- Born: Binghamton, New York, U.S.
- Party: Republican
- Children: 2
- Education: Grove City College (BA); University of Akron (JD)

Todd A. Snitchler is an American politician, attorney, and energy industry lobbyist who served as a member of the Ohio House of Representatives for the 50th district from 2009 to 2011. After resigning from the House, he served as chair of the Public Utilities Commission of Ohio.

== Early life and education ==
Snitchler was born and raised in Binghamton, New York]. He earned a Bachelor of Arts degree in history, secondary education, and sociology from Grove City College, followed by a Juris Doctor from the University of Akron School of Law.

== Career ==
Snitchler began his career as an attorney at Stark & Knoll Co. L.P.A. in Akron, Ohio. He worked as an attorney at Oldham & Dowling before his election to the Ohio House of Representatives in 2008. Snitchler served one term and resigned in February 2011. Snitchler was then appointed to serve as chair of the Public Utilities Commission of Ohio by then-Governor John Kasich and served until April 2014. Snitchler later worked as an attorney at McDonald Hopkins LLC and a principal at Vorys Advisors. He was a member of the Westerville Library Foundation Board and vice president of the American Petroleum Institute for market development. Since June 2019, he has worked as president and CEO of the Electric Power Supply Association (EPSA). In his role, Snitchler has testified before the United States Congress and state legislatures on energy policy. In 2021, he was named one of Washington, D.C.'s most influential people by Washingtonian.
