= Andy Thompson (Ohio politician) =

American politician (1963–2020)

Member of the Ohio House of Representatives from the 95th district
- In office January 3, 2011 – December 31, 2018
- Preceded by: Larry Woodford
- Succeeded by: Don Jones

Personal details
- Born: Andrew Miller Thompson; February 8, 1963 Pella, Iowa, U.S.
- Died: May 13, 2020 (aged 57) Marietta, Ohio, U.S.
- Party: Republican
- Education: Central College
- Profession: Publisher

Andrew Miller Thompson (February 8, 1963 – May 13, 2020) was an American politician who was a Republican member of the Ohio House of Representatives for the 95th district, which includes Carroll, Harrison and Noble counties, and portions of Washington and Belmont counties. Prior to 2012 redistricting, he represented the 93rd district for one term. He served three terms on Marietta City Council (2005–2011) and was a co-publisher of his family's magazine, Bird Watcher's Digest.

== Early life ==
Thompson was born in Pella, Iowa on February 8, 1963. He moved to Marietta, Ohio in 1971 and graduated from Marietta High School in 1981. He graduated from Central College at Pella, Iowa in 1985, and spent four years working for the Competitive Enterprise Institute, a libertarian think tank. Thompson was a member of the National Rifle Association of America.

== Political career ==
=== Ohio House of Representatives ===
Thompson was first elected to represent the 93rd district in the Ohio House in November 2010, defeating Democrat Linda Secrest with 53.8% of the vote. After redistricting, Thompson ran in the 95th district, and defeated Democrat Charlie Daniels with 52.83% of the vote.

=== Political positions ===
In March 2013, Thompson introduced a bill that would effectively kill Ohio's healthcare exchange under the Affordable Care Act by prohibiting any insurance company that participated in the exchange from doing business in Ohio.

Thompson was an activist against the Common Core State Standards Initiative, and introduced a bill, HB 237, that would pull Ohio out of the standards and prohibit using the core-aligned standardized tests.

== Personal life ==
Thompson's wife, Jade, is a Spanish teacher at Marietta High School. They had three children. He died on May 13, 2020, at the age of 57 following a heart attack.

== Bibliography ==
- "Thompson among those suing over Medicaid expansion". The Marietta Times. October 24, 2013.
- Rogers, Jasmine (November 17, 2012). "Changes mean lighter sentences for local felons". The Marietta Times.
