= Larry Woodford =

American politician

Member of the Ohio House of Representatives from the 93rd district
- In office November 30, 2010 – December 31, 2010
- Preceded by: Jennifer Garrison
- Succeeded by: Andy Thompson

Personal details
- Party: Democratic

Larry Woodford is a former Democratic member of the Ohio House of Representatives, who served one month in 2010. Woodford also served as a trustee in Noble County for eleven years, and worked for the Ohio Department of Transportation for over three years. Before working for the Ohio Department of Transportation, Woodford worked for 26 years as a master electrician for Central Ohio Coal Company.

When incumbent Jennifer Garrison resigned late in 2010 to take an appointment under Governor Ted Strickland, Woodford was appointed for the remaining month of her term. Woodford was replaced by Representative-elect Andy Thompson in January 2011.
