= Allan Sayre =

American politician (born 1969)

Member of the Ohio House of Representatives from the 96th district
- In office January 3, 2005 – June 2, 2010
- Preceded by: Charlie Wilson
- Succeeded by: Joshua O'Farrell

Personal details
- Born: November 12, 1969 (age 56) Dover, Ohio, US
- Party: Democratic

Allan Sayre (born November 12, 1969) is an American politician who served as a member of the Ohio House of Representatives, from the 96th district, which covers Dover. He was also the Assistant Majority Whip.
