= Steve Wilson (Ohio politician) =

American politician

Member of the Ohio Senate from the 7th district
- Incumbent
- Assumed office January 25, 2017
- Preceded by: Shannon Jones
- Succeeded by: Zac Haines (elect)

Personal details
- Born: May 29, 1950 (age 76) Troy, Ohio, U.S.
- Party: Republican
- Education: Miami University (BA)
- Website: ohiosenate.gov/senators/wilson

Steve Wilson (born May 29, 1950) is an American politician serving as the state senator for the 7th District of the Ohio Senate. He is a Republican. The district covers Warren County, a portion of Butler County including parts of Middletown and a portion of Hamilton County, including Blue Ash and Springdale.

== Life and career ==
Wilson received a B.A. in finance from Miami University in 1972, and then served in the United States Navy as a Lieutenant. After his service in the Navy, Wilson started in an entry-level teller position at Lebanon Citizens National Bank (LCNB), rising to serve as the CEO of both LCNB Corp. and Lebanon Citizens National Bank. Wilson continues to serve on the board of LCNB. While leading LCNB Wilson expanded it from serving two local communities to over 30 throughout nine Ohio counties.

He formerly was the chair of the American Bankers Association, chair of the Ohio Bankers Association, president of Warren County Chamber of Commerce, vice-chair of Otterbein Senior Life, and has served as a board member of the Federal Reserve Bank of Cleveland.

Wilson also previously served on the board of trustees for his alma mater, Miami University. His first entrance into elected office was as a School Board member, and later President for Lebanon City School District. Wilson is heavily involved in the local community, currently serving on the boards of Countryside YMCA, the Warren County Foundation, the American Automobile Association (AAA) Allied Group, and is a member of the Warren County Area Progress Council.

Senator Wilson is a prolific fundraiser for local civic organizations and nonprofits; leading a $4 million campaign for the Countryside YMCA's expansion to become the largest YMCA in the world, a capital campaign for the Ohio Historical Society that resulted in the creation of the Gateway Visitors Center at Fort Ancient, was a leader on a committee for Otterbein Senior Life Community that raised $3.1 million to create its Life Enrichment Center, and serving as co-chair of the capital campaign to create the Warren County Foundation.

Wilson has been named Citizen of the Year by the Lebanon Chamber of Commerce and inducted into both the Butler County and Cincinnati Magazine's Business Hall of Fame. Wilson was awarded for his philanthropic efforts with the George Henkle Award from the Warren County Foundation. He is also a member of the gubernatorially appointed Executive Order of The Ohio Commodore, which is considered Ohio’s “most distinguished honor”.

== Ohio Senate ==
In 2016, Senator Shannon Jones who had served in the Senate since 2009, announced that she would forgo her last two years before being term-limited to run for county commissioner in Warren County. Winning that seat, she resigned from the Senate effective December 31, 2016, prior to the beginning of the new General Assembly.

It was announced that Wilson would receive the appointment on January 13, 2017, and that he would be seated soon after. On January 25, 2017, Wilson was sworn in to complete the remainder of the term. Senator Wilson was elected in 2018 and re-elected in 2022 to serve 4-year terms. In each of his campaigns, Wilson won 62% of the vote in the respective general elections. Currently, he serves as Dean of the Ohio Senate as the longest tenured Senator in the 136th General Assembly.

Wilson is the Chairman of the Ohio Senate Financial Institutions, Insurance & Technology Committee. He also serves on the Public Utilities Committee, Ways & Means Committee, Medicaid Committee, and is Vice Chairman of the Armed Services, Veterans Affairs & Public Safety Committee. Senator Wilson is the founder and co-chairman of the nation's first Legislative Trails Caucus, which has since worked to forward Ohio's trail systems.

Steve Wilson's legislative accomplishments include harsher penalties on public officials convicted of theft, promoting workforce development by streamlining access to certifications necessary for in-demand jobs, combatting fraud and exploitation of Ohio's senior citizens, establishing financial literacy and capitalism course requirements as a condition for graduation for high school students, and modernizing Ohio's notary laws to allow secure virtual notarization. Senator Wilson has received perfect scores for his work and voting record from the Ohio Chamber of Commerce and the American Conservative Union. Senator Wilson has been awarded for his efforts in the Ohio Statehouse, including by the County Treasurers Association of Ohio, the Ohio's Public Service Award from LeadingAge Ohio, a trade organization that represents Ohio's non-profit senior living, healthcare, and hospice organizations, and two awards for "Conservative Excellence" from the American Conservative Union.

Senator Wilson is a lifelong Republican and a member of the Warren County Republican Party Executive Committee.

== Abortion legislation ==
In 2019, Wilson co-sponsored Ohio Senate Bill 23, commonly known as the "Heartbeat Bill." The legislation bans abortions once a fetal heartbeat is detectable, which can occur as early as six weeks into pregnancy. The bill includes no exceptions for rape or incest. Governor Mike DeWine signed it into law on April 11, 2019.

Wilson’s support for SB 23 aligned with a broader effort among Ohio Republican legislators to advance restrictive abortion laws. The bill became one of the most controversial in the nation and was subject to immediate legal challenge.

In September 2022, a temporary restraining order issued by a Hamilton County judge blocked enforcement of the law, restoring abortion access in Ohio up to 22 weeks of pregnancy while legal proceedings continued.

Political offices
Preceded by Shannon Jones	Ohio Senate, 7th District; 2017–present	Incumbent
