= Ohio's 7th senatorial district =

American legislative district

Ohio's 7th State Senate district
Senator
Steve Wilson; R–Maineville
- Demographics: 75.2% White; 9.6% Black; 4.6% Hispanic; 8.5% Asian; 1.8% Native American; 0.2% Hawaiian/Pacific Islander
- Population (2020) • Voting age • Citizens of voting age: 366,619; 277,848; 254,446

Ohio's 7th senatorial district was changed as a result of the 2023 redistricting. It currently consists of the entirety of Warren County and a small section of the northeast corner of Hamilton County. It encompasses Ohio House districts 28, 55 and 56.

The current Ohio Senator is Republican Steve Wilson and will be succeeded by Republican member-elect Zac Haines in January 2027.

== 2026 election results ==
Zac Haines (R) 88,157 52.8%

Cara Jacobs (D) 78,673 47.2%

Interestingly Zac Haines won in the Warren County part of the district and Cara Jacob (Democrat) had the most votes in the smaller Hamilton County section of the district.

== Historically ==
Before the 2023 redistricting, the 7th senatorial district was in southwestern Ohio and consisted of Warren County, Western Clermont County, and the eastern suburbs of Hamilton County. It has a Cook PVI of R+12.

== List of senators ==
Senator	Party	Term	Notes
Mike Maloney	Republican	November 9, 1964 – August 14, 1978	Maloney resigned in 1978 to serve as Hamilton County Administrator.
Richard Finan	Republican	September 14, 1978 – December 31, 2002	Finan served as Senate President from 1997 to 2002 and was term-limited in 2002.
Bob Schuler	Republican	January 6, 2003 – June 19, 2009	Schuler died prior to the expiration of his second term.
Shannon Jones	Republican	August 11, 2009 – December 31, 2016	Elected to the Warren County Board of Commissioners
Steve Wilson	Republican	January 25, 2017 – present	Incumbent
