= Christina Hagan =

American politician

Member-elect of the Ohio House of Representatives from the 48th district
- Assuming office January 1, 2027
- Succeeding: Scott Oelslager

Member of the Ohio House of Representatives from the 50th district
- In office March 2, 2011 – December 31, 2018
- Preceded by: Todd Snitchler
- Succeeded by: Reggie Stoltzfus

Personal details
- Born: Christina Marie Hagan; December 11, 1988 (age 37) Alliance, Ohio, U.S.
- Party: Republican
- Education: Malone University (BA)
- Website: State House website

Christina Marie Hagan-Nemeth (born December 11, 1988) is an American politician and former Republican member of the Ohio House of Representatives for the 50th district. She was the Republican nominee in the 2020 election to represent Ohio's 13th congressional district.

== Early life and education ==
Hagan was born and raised in Marlboro Township, a rural township in Stark County, Ohio. She earned a degree in business administration with minors in business management and political science at Malone University. She supported herself in high school and college by working at various jobs: for her family's businesses, Hagan Heating and Plumbing, Bravo! Cucina Italiana and Carrabba's Italian Grill. She also volunteered on her father's political campaigns.

== Career ==
=== Ohio House of Representatives ===
Hagan-Nemeth served as a state representative from 2011 to 2018. She ran against Todd Snitchler in 2008, losing in the Republican primary to replace her father.

=== Congressional campaigns ===
Hagan-Nemeth announced in April 2017 that she was running for Congress in the 16th district in the 2018 election. She lost the primary to Anthony Gonzalez, with 40% of the vote to Gonzalez's 53%. Hagan-Nemeth did not live in the 16th congressional district.

On April 28, 2020, after competing in the most crowded field in Northeast Ohio, Hagan-Nemeth won the Republican primary for Ohio's 13th congressional district, with preliminary results showing her winning 66% of the vote. Hagan-Nemeth faced incumbent Democrat Tim Ryan in the general election. She does not live in the 13th congressional district and was criticized for seeking office outside her district. She lost the election, receiving 44.9% of the vote.

== Personal life ==
In 2014 Hagan-Nemeth married Adam Nemeth, whom she met while studying at Malone University. He is a plumber, electrician, and HVAC technician who has worked at the Hagan family HVAC company and is also a volunteer firefighter and emergency medical technician in Marlboro Township. Hagan-Nemeth gave birth to her daughter Josaphine Jane in 2015 and twin sons in October 2018.

Hagan is a Methodist.
