= Melody J. Stewart =

American judge (born 1962)

Melody Stewart

Justice of the Ohio Supreme Court
- In office January 2, 2019 – January 1, 2025
- Preceded by: Mary DeGenaro
- Succeeded by: Joe Deters

Personal details
- Born: February 19, 1962 (age 63); Cleveland, Ohio, U.S.
- Political party: Democratic
- Education: University of Cincinnati (BM); Cleveland State University (JD); Case Western Reserve University (PhD)

Melody J. Stewart (born February 19, 1962) was a justice of the Ohio Supreme Court. She formerly served as a Judge on the Ohio Eighth District Court of Appeals. Stewart was elected to the Ohio Supreme Court in 2018, having defeated incumbent Justice Mary DeGenaro.

== Education ==
Stewart earned a Bachelor of Music in music theory from the College-Conservatory of Music at the University of Cincinnati; her Juris Doctor as a Patricia Roberts Harris Fellow from the Cleveland-Marshall College of Law; and her Doctor of Philosophy as a Mandel Leadership Fellow at Case Western Reserve University’s Mandel School of Applied Social Sciences.

== Judicial career ==
Stewart was first elected to the Ohio District Court of Appeals in 2006 and twice re-elected.

=== Ohio Supreme Court ===
On November 8, 2018, Stewart faced incumbent Mary DeGenaro in the general election for a seat on the Supreme Court. She won the seat 52.5% to 47.5%. She is the first African-American woman elected to the Supreme Court.

== Academia ==
Stewart worked as a lecturer, an adjunct instructor, and an assistant dean at Cleveland-Marshall College of Law before joining the faculty. Her primary teaching areas were ethics and professional responsibility, criminal law, criminal procedure, and legal research, writing, and advocacy. Additionally, she taught at the University of Toledo College of Law, at Ursuline College, and was Director of Student Services at Case Western Reserve University's School of Law.

== See also ==
- List of African-American jurists

Legal offices
Preceded by Mary DeGenaro	Justice of the Ohio Supreme Court; 2019–2025	Succeeded by Joe Deters
