= Mary DeGenaro =

American judge (born 1961)

Justice of the Supreme Court of Ohio
- In office January 28, 2018 – January 1, 2019
- Appointed by: John Kasich
- Preceded by: William O'Neill
- Succeeded by: Melody J. Stewart

Judge of the Ohio Seventh District Court of Appeals
- In office February 9, 2001 – January 28, 2018

Personal details
- Born: April 25, 1961 (age 65) Cleveland, Ohio, U.S.
- Education: Youngstown State University (BA); Cleveland State University (JD)

Mary DeGenaro (born April 25, 1961) is an American lawyer who served as a justice of the Supreme Court of Ohio from 2018 to 2019.

== Biography ==
DeGenaro received her Bachelor of Arts degree from Youngstown State University in 1983 and her Juris Doctor from the Cleveland-Marshall College of Law in 1986.

After graduation from law school, she served as a law clerk to Judge George Washington White of the United States District Court for the Northern District of Ohio.

She served 14 years in private practice before her election to the bench. During her judicial service, she also served as an adjunct faculty member for the political science department at Youngstown State University.

== State court service ==
DeGenaro served as a judge from 2001 to 2018 on the Seventh District Court of Appeals in Youngstown. She was sworn in on February 9, 2001.

== Supreme Court of Ohio service ==
On January 25, 2018, Governor John Kasich announced his appointment of DeGenaro to fill the seat vacated by the retirement of William O'Neill. She was sworn in as Ohio's 159th Justice on January 28, 2018. At the time of her appointment, it made the composition of the court all Republican jurists and majority female.

On November 8, 2018, DeGenaro faced Melody J. Stewart in the general election for a seat on the Supreme Court. Stewart won the seat 52.5% to 47.5%.

== Recognition and memberships ==
She served as vice president of the Ohio Women's Bar Association at the time of her Supreme Court appointment.

In 2005, she began serving as a founding member of the Ohio State Bar Association's Appellate Practice Specialty Certification Board, which administers the specialty bar examination and certification.

Legal offices
Preceded by William O'Neill	Justice of the Ohio Supreme Court; 2018–2019	Succeeded by Melody J. Stewart
