= Bob Schuler =

American politician (1943–2009)

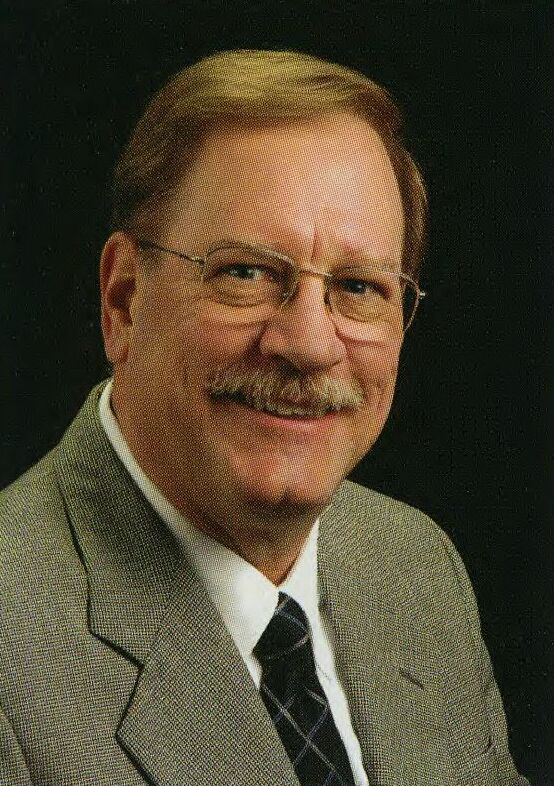
- Official portrait, 2006

Member of the Ohio Senate from the 7th district
- In office January 6, 2003 – June 19, 2009
- Preceded by: Richard Finan
- Succeeded by: Shannon Jones

Member of the Ohio House of Representatives from the 36th district
- In office January 3, 1993 – December 31, 2000
- Preceded by: Terry Tranter
- Succeeded by: Michelle G. Schneider

Personal details
- Born: Robert Schuler; June 15, 1943 Cincinnati, Ohio, U.S.
- Died: June 19, 2009 (aged 66) Cincinnati, Ohio, U.S.
- Party: Republican

Robert Schuler (June 15, 1943 – June 19, 2009) was an American politician who served in the Ohio General Assembly and Ohio Senate. A member of the Republican Party, Schuler first entered politics in the late 1970s as a member of the Deer Park City Council and also spent four years as a Sycamore Township trustee from 1988 to 1992. Initially running for the Ohio House of Representatives in 1992, he went on to win reelection in 1994, 1996, and 1998. With term limits in effect, Schuler was ineligible to run for a fifth term in 2000, and was succeeded by Michelle G. Schneider.

Although term-limited from the House, Schuler soon returned to the legislature as a member of the Ohio Senate. With Richard Finan term-limited in 2002, Schuler sought his seat. He went on to win, and was reelected in 2006.

In his memoir Hillbilly Elegy, future Ohio Senator and Vice President of the United States JD Vance recalls that he worked for Schuler while he was in college.

Suffering from cancer while in the Senate, Schuler died in June 2009, with a year and a half left in his term. Shannon Jones was appointed by senate Republicans to fill out the remainder of his term.
