= Dennis Murray (politician) =

American politician

Mayor of Sandusky, Ohio
- In office January 1, 2014 – December 31, 2020
- Preceded by: Dan Kaman
- Succeeded by: Richard Brady

Member of the Ohio House of Representatives from the 80th district
- In office January 5, 2009 – December 31, 2012
- Preceded by: Chris Redfern
- Succeeded by: Richard Adams

Personal details
- Born: May 25, 1962 (age 64) Sandusky, Ohio
- Party: Democratic
- Education: Georgetown University
- Profession: Attorney

Dennis E. Murray Jr. (born May 25, 1962) is a former City Commissioner in the City of Sandusky. He served as a Sandusky City Commissioner from 2014 until he was unable to run for reelection due to term limits in 2026. Dennis is a former member of the Ohio House of Representatives, serving the 80th District from 2009 to 2012.

== Career ==
Murray obtained his law degree from Georgetown University and returned to Ohio to work in his family's law firm in Sandusky, where he specializes in contracts, antitrust, securities, and investor and banking fraud. He was elected a Sandusky City Commissioner in 2005 and served until his election to the House. In January 2014, he returned to the Sandusky City Commission where he was chosen to be ex officio mayor. He won re-election to an additional four-year term in November 2017, and in 2021 he won re-election to final four-year term.

== Ohio House of Representatives ==
With incumbent and Ohio Democratic Party Chairman Chris Redfern unable to run again due to term limits, Murray received the nomination to replace him. In the general election, he defeated Republican Ed Enderle with 53.22% of the vote to take his first term.

In 2010, Republicans saw Murray as potentially vulnerable and fielded Jeff Krabill, a marketing firm owner and Sandusky City School Board member, to try to knock him off. However, he managed to keep his seat with 49.06% of the electorate, less than 1000 votes more than Krabill. Murray was sworn into a second term on January 3, 2011. He served on the committees of Judiciary and Ethics (as ranking member), Commerce and Labor, and Agriculture and Natural Resources. He also served on the Great Lakes – St. Lawrence River Basin Water Resources Compact Advisory Board; and the Turnpike Legislative Review Committee.

== Initiatives and positions ==
=== Corporate welfare ===
Murray has been a vocal opponent of Governor John Kasich's plan to privatize the Ohio Department of Development. Along with Michael J. Skindell, Murray has filed a lawsuit against Ohio Governor John Kasich's JobsOhio privatization measure, which Murray has called unconstitutional. One quarrel with the initiative is that under the Ohio Constitution, the Governor is unable to hold two positions, which would occur under JobsOhio. Murray has stated he will continue to challenge the provisions.

In yet another move that sought to challenge Ohio Governor John Kasich, Murray has challenged Kasich to withhold his campaign pledge to not allow drilling on Lake Erie. Kasich has proposed leasing state properties for potential drilling for oil and natural gas.

=== Social issues ===
He also is an opponent of Matt Huffman's plan to raise Ohio's retirement age for judges seeking election from 70 to 75, stating he had practiced before several state and federal judges who appeared to have stayed too long on the bench. Nonetheless, both measures ultimately passed the Ohio House of Representatives. Murray has acknowledged that there is no effective system of peers that can step up to sitting judges and tell them it's time to step aside.

=== Collective bargaining ===
With a collective bargaining bill that looks to take away specific rights for public employees, Murray has come out in opposition, and voted against the bill while it was in committee. He called the legislation masquerading as a budget issue.
