= Transportation improvement district =

US-specific districts for improving transport

A transportation improvement district (abbreviated TID) or transportation development district (TDD) is a special-purpose district created in some U.S. states for the purpose of coordinating and financing transportation infrastructure improvement programs, particularly road construction projects, among local governments in a specific area. Depending on the state, they may have the authority to levy sales or property taxes or issue municipal bonds. TIDs or TDDs are authorized in Missouri, New Jersey, Ohio, and Virginia.

== Missouri ==
As of December 31, 2004, 69 TDDs have been established in the state of Missouri. TDDs were first authorized in 1990, and the first was established in 1997. A TDD is limited to 20 years.

== New Jersey ==
TDDs in New Jersey are authorized under the New Jersey Transportation Development District Act of 1989.

== Ohio ==
In Ohio, TIDs are authorized under Ohio Rev. Code chapter 5540, "Transportation improvement districts". They may be created by a board of county commissioners.

The Butler County TID was created in December 1994 in order to build the Butler County Regional Highway (now the Butler County Veterans Highway, part of SR 129).

== Virginia ==
Virginia authorized the creation of special tax districts in 1987. Fairfax and Loudoun counties quickly formed the first transportation improvement district in the Commonwealth to finance improvements to Virginia State Route 28.

== See also ==
- Congestion management agency
- Tax increment financing
