= Colleen Mary O'Toole =

American politician

Colleen M. O'Toole
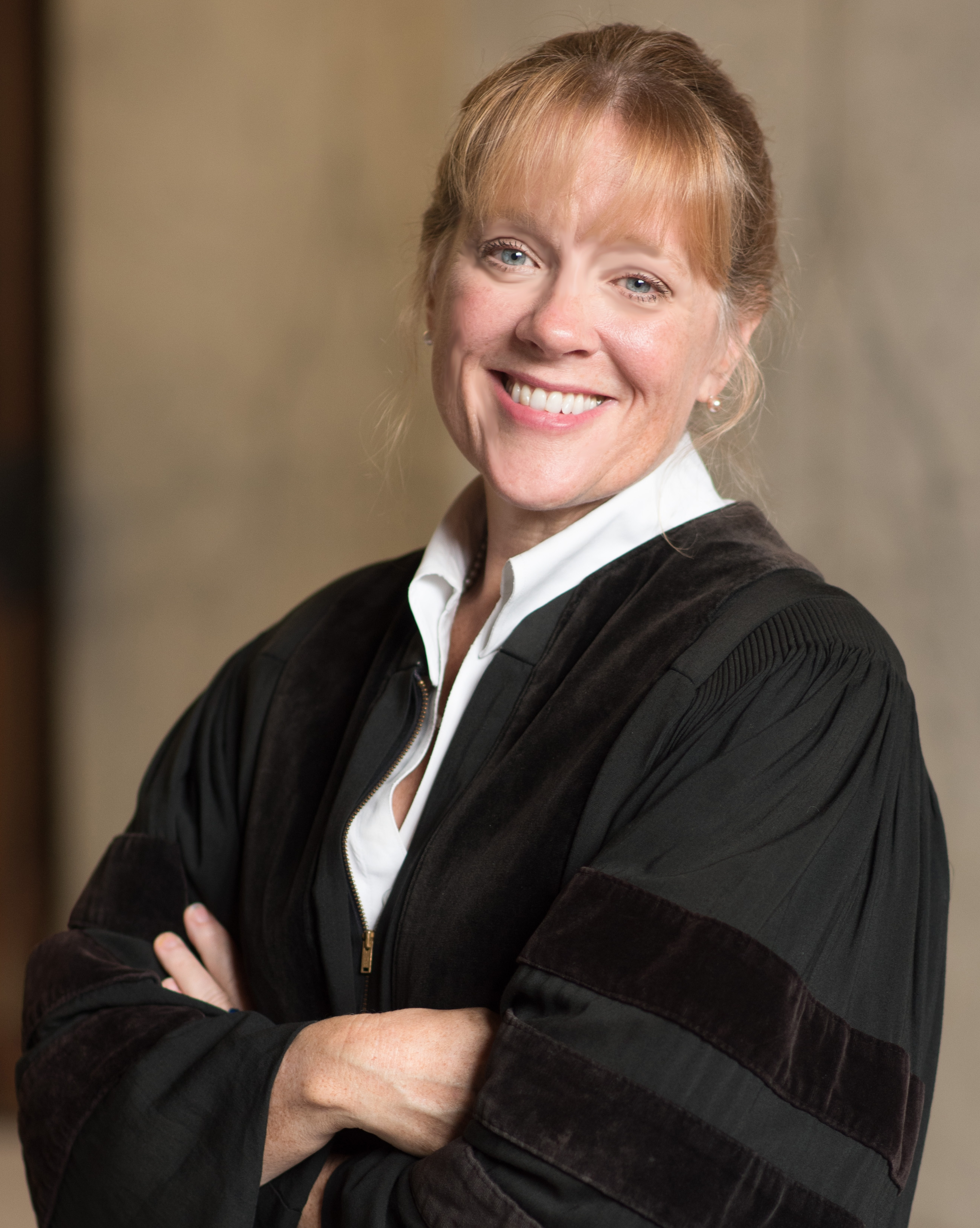

Judge of the Ohio Court of Appeals, Eleventh District
- In office 2013–2019
- Preceded by: Mary Jane Trapp
- Succeeded by: Matt Lynch

Judge of the Ohio Court of Appeals, Eleventh District
- In office 2005–2011
- Preceded by: Judith Christley
- Succeeded by: Mary Jane Trapp

Colleen Mary O'Toole is an American politician who presently serves as Prosecutor for Ashtabula County, Ohio. O'Toole previously served as an Appellate Judge of the Ohio Eleventh District Court of Appeals. O'Toole was first elected in 2004 to the Court of Appeals in 2004. O'Toole left the Eleventh District at the end of her term in February 2011 after being defeated in the 2010 election, and founded award-winning, On Demand Interpretation Services, LLC, an entrepreneurial start up that provides certified interpretation in 170 languages and American sign-language to public entities and their support networks. In 2012, she returned to the Eleventh District Court of Appeals by defeating sitting Judge Mary Jane Trapp. O'Toole was defeated in her bid for re-election in 2018 when she lost in the Republican primary to Matt Lynch. In 2020, O'Toole was elected Prosecutor for Ashtabula County, Ohio, flipping the office to the Republicans.

== Legal career ==
Judge O'Toole began her legal career in 1991 as a law clerk and a litigation and appellate attorney in the Cuyahoga County Public Defender's Office. After this, she worked as a litigation manager for the National Interstate Company. In 1995, she began working as counsel with the firm Kramer and Niermann, LPA. Then, in 1998, she opened her own "Law Offices of Colleen M. O'Toole". She has practiced in the areas of civil, criminal, corporate and family law.

In 2004, she was elected to the Court of Appeals. She lost her re-election bid in 2010. She was then elected again to the bench in 2012. She has decided over 1500 cases 72 murders and authored over 500 opinions. She established a case management system which reduced backlog by 60% in the court of appeals. She advocated for efficiency and increased access to pro se litigants.

Judge O'Toole is admitted to practice before the United States District Court for the Northern District of Ohio, the United States Court of Appeals for the Sixth Circuit, and the United States Supreme Court. She has held memberships in the American, Ohio, Cleveland, Lake County and Geauga County Bar Associations and has been a member of the Cuyahoga County Criminal Defense Lawyers Association. She was an adjunct professor at John Carroll University, and presently serves as one for Kent State University.

As of 2025, she is no longer the prosecutor of Ashtabula County. Her time as the prosecutor was viewed as horrible by many in Ashtabula County. She was not on speaking terms with some of the judges, and her own party asked her to step down as prosecutor, however, she refused.

Additionally, she is currently appealing an audit that was conducted in 2022, where she is accused of misusing funds. https://www.starbeacon.com/news/county-prosecutor-disputes-2022-audit-findings/article_3daf5fc6-c9f0-11ef-89d9-071c456b5c7d.html

== Judicial campaign complaint against O'Toole ==
Prior to the 2012 election, a close personal friend of her electoral opponent, Mary Jane Trapp, filed a 12-count grievance against O'Toole alleging that she had violated the Ohio Code of Judicial Conduct. Nine of the charges were dismissed at the probable-cause stage. One month before the 2012 election, two of the three remaining violations were found to have merit. Despite this finding O'Toole won the election, resoundingly defeating her opponent, Trapp.

O'Toole appealed and in 2014, the Ohio Supreme Court dismissed one of the two remaining counts, finding O'Toole had violated the remaining charge related to a name badge that she wore during the 2012 election. O'Toole relied upon the case of In re Judicial Campaign Grievance Against O'Neill, 132 Ohio St.3d 1472, 2012-Ohio-3223, in asserting her first amendment right to use the honorary title as she had earned in her prior election. Two of the judges appointed to hear O'Toole's case, [Judge Patrick F. Fischer and Judge Vernon L. Preston,] had dissented in the O'Neill case. The Ohio Supreme Court fined O'Toole and ordered her to pay the complainant's attorney's fees.

Justice Paul E. Pfeifer, concurring in part and dissenting in part, wrote the following

O'Toole has already paid a steep price, suffering public censure, which this court has determined today was only partly deserved. But that is the way of Gov.Jud.R. II(5)—the process moves quickly from the panel to the commission to this court, and the results—right or wrong—are publicized along the way. The Board of Commissioners on Grievances and Discipline received Davis's complaint letter on August 9, 2012. By October 6, 2012, the panel hearing was completed, a recommendation had been issued, and an article had appeared in the Cleveland Plain Dealer deriding O'Toole...

... In the heat of the campaign for a spot on the Eleventh District Court of Appeals, O'Toole was repeatedly maligned in newspapers covering the district.

...{¶ 78} And that is just as James B. Davis, the complainant, would have it, because he was working as the alter ego of O'Toole's opponent, Mary Jane Trapp. Davis, a longtime friend of Trapp and her husband, Mike Apicella, testified that Trapp and her husband "primarily drafted" the original grievance. He testified that since he had filed the grievance, his interactions with Trapp were "an almost constant process." He testified that Trapp and her husband selected the attorneys to be used in the case and that it was his expectation that he would be reimbursed for any attorney fees he would have to pay. Apicella had even driven him to the panel hearing. Trapp received an electoral advantage as the result of this case, much of it undeserved given today's outcome.

== Personal ==
Colleen O'Toole enjoys angling, and lives on the Grand River with her husband, a marine veteran and NRA Certified Instructor, their three children one of whom is a foster child and their dog, Lucky O'Toole. She is licensed to carry a concealed weapon and enjoys target shooting.
