= 2018 Ohio gubernatorial election =

- November 6, 2018
- Turnout: 55.79% (registered voters) ▲15.14pp
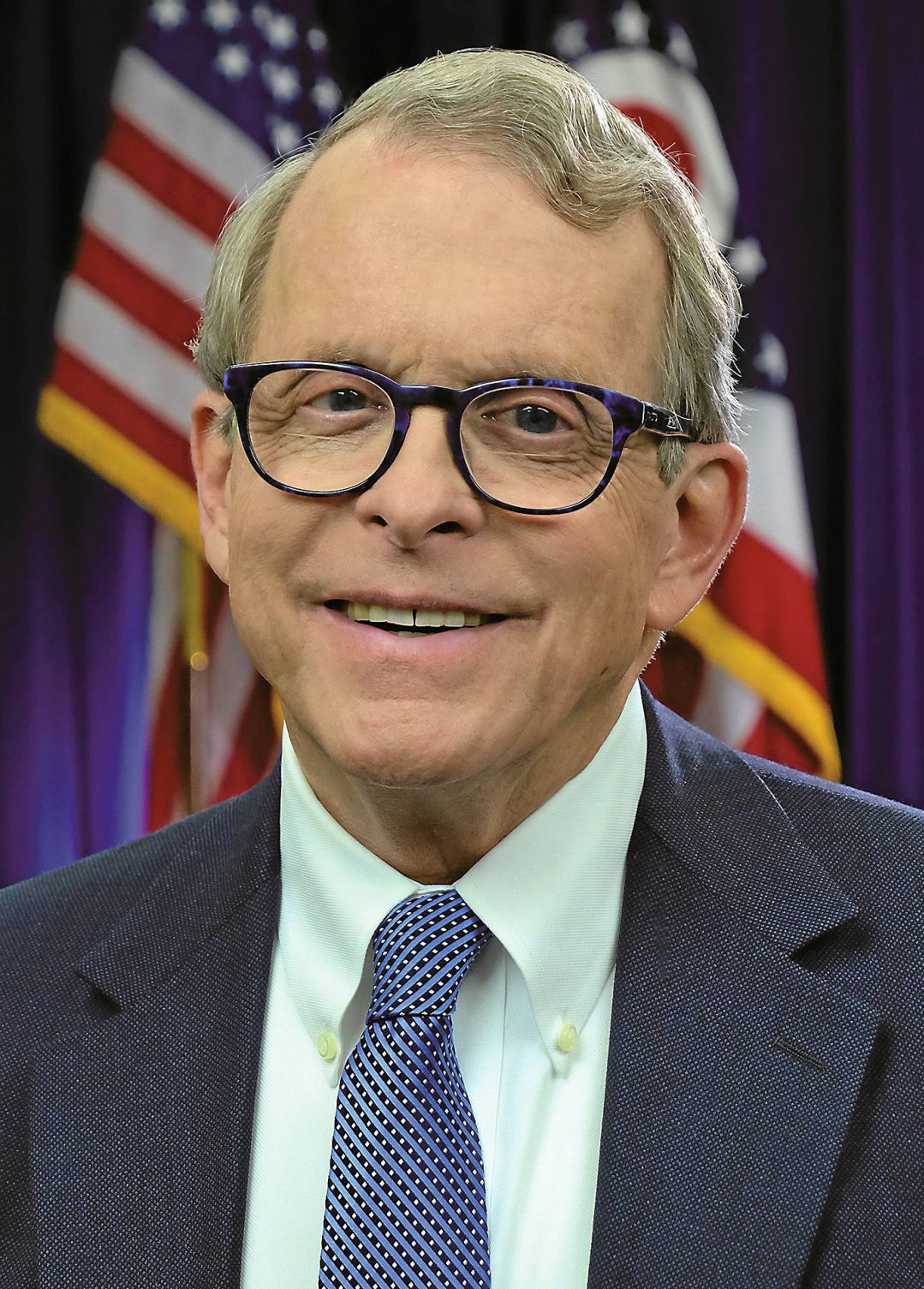

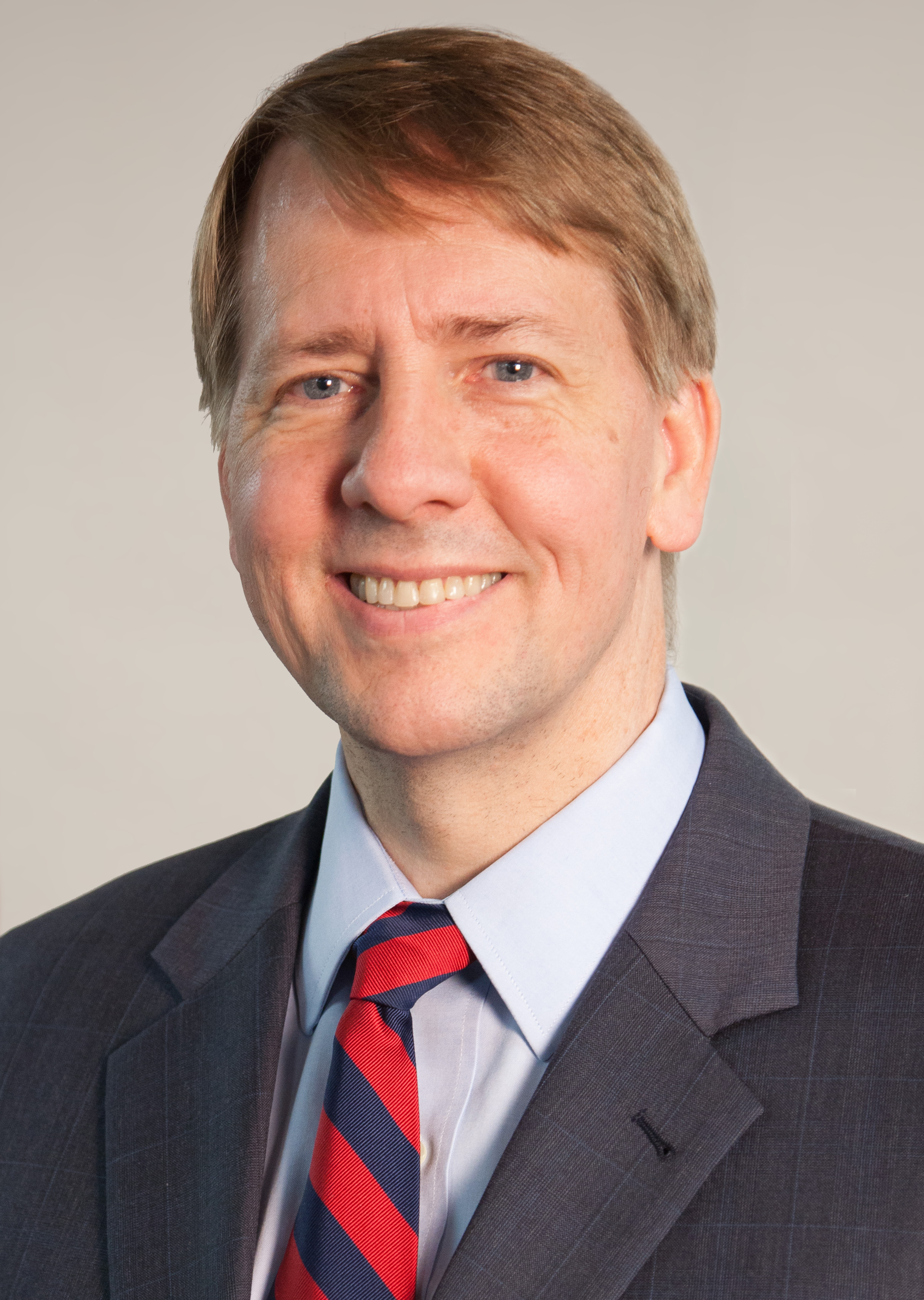
Nominee	Mike DeWine	Richard Cordray
Party	Republican	Democratic
Running mate	Jon Husted	Betty Sutton
Popular vote	2,235,825	2,070,046
Percentage	50.40%	46.67%
- DeWine: 30–40% 40–50% 50–60% 60–70% 70–80% 80–90% >90% Cordray: 40–50% 50–60% 60–70% 70–80% 80–90% >90% Tie: 40–50% No votes
Governor before election
John Kasich
Republican
Elected Governor
Mike DeWine
Republican

The 2018 Ohio gubernatorial election took place on November 6, 2018, to elect the next governor of Ohio, concurrently with the election of Ohio's Class I U.S. Senate seat, as well as other elections to the United States Senate in other states, elections to the United States House of Representatives, and various Ohio and local elections. Incumbent Republican Governor John Kasich was term-limited and could not seek a third consecutive term.

Republicans nominated Ohio Attorney General and former U.S. senator Mike DeWine, while Democrats nominated former Consumer Financial Protection Bureau director and former Ohio attorney general Richard Cordray. This was the second contest between DeWine and Cordray, following the 2010 attorney general election, which DeWine won, 47.5% to 46.3%.

In 2018, DeWine defeated Cordray 50.4% to 46.7%, in what was considered a minor upset. Despite Cordray's loss, he became the first Democratic gubernatorial candidate to win Cincinnati's Hamilton County since Dick Celeste in 1982. Likewise, DeWine became the first Republican to win in the historically Democratic Monroe County in a gubernatorial election since 2002 as the county took a sharp turn to the right. With Democratic Senator Sherrod Brown winning re-election in the same year, this was the first election since 1974 in which Ohio simultaneously voted for a gubernatorial nominee and a U.S. Senate nominee of opposite parties.

DeWine and Husted took office on January 14, 2019.

== Republican primary ==
=== Candidates ===
==== Nominated ====
- Mike DeWine, Ohio attorney general, former U.S. senator, former lieutenant governor of Ohio, and former U.S. representative
  - Running mate: Jon Husted, Ohio secretary of state and former speaker of the Ohio House of Representatives

==== Eliminated in primary ====
- Mary Taylor, lieutenant governor of Ohio
  - Running mate: Nathan Estruth, businessman

==== Withdrew ====
- Jon Husted, Ohio secretary of state (ran for lieutenant governor with DeWine)
- Jim Renacci, U.S. representative from Ohio's 16th congressional district (ran for U.S. Senate)
  - Running mate: Amy Murray, Cincinnati councilwoman

=== Endorsements ===
Mike DeWine

Notable individuals

- Zachary Hall, chairman of the Lucas County Teenage Republicans
- Julie Jakmides, Alliance councilwoman
- David Johnson, chair of the Columbiana County Republican Party
- Richard K. Jones, Butler County sheriff
- Dave Levacy, Fairfield County commissioner
- Amy Murray, Cincinnati City Council member
- Gerard Neugebauer, Green mayor
- Rick Santorum, former United States senator from Pennsylvania and candidate for president of the United States in 2012 and 2016

U.S. representatives

- Steve Stivers (OH-15)
- Mike Turner (OH-10)

State senators

- Kevin Bacon
- Troy Balderson
- Bill Beagle
- David Burke
- Matt Dolan
- John Eklund
- Randy Gardner (majority leader)
- Bob Hackett
- Frank Hoagland
- Jay Hottinger
- Stephanie Kunze
- Peggy Lehner
- Gayle Manning (majority whip)
- Rob McColley
- Larry Obhof (president)
- Scott Oelslager
- Bob Peterson (president pro tempore)
- Joe Uecker

State representatives

- Sarah LaTourette (assistant majority leader)
- Tom Patton (majority whip)
- Bill Reineke (assistant majority whip)
- Cliff Rosenberger (speaker)
- Gary Scherer
- Kirk Schuring (speaker pro tempore)

County parties

- Adams County Republican Party
- Belmont County Republican Party
- Brown County Republican Party
- Clinton County Republican Party
- Columbiana County Republican Party
- Cuyahoga County Republican Party
- Franklin County Republican Party
- Fulton County Republican Party
- Greene County Republican Party
- Highland County Republican Party
- Holmes County Republican Party
- Knox County Republican Party
- Lucas County Republican Party
- Mahoning County Republican Party
- Montgomery County Republican Party
- Morgan County Republican Party
- Perry County Republican Party
- Pike County Republican Party
- Preble County Republican Party
- Scioto County Republican Party
- Summit County Republican Party

State parties

- Ohio Republican Party

Organizations

- Buckeye Firearms Association

Newspapers

- Akron Beacon Journal
- The Plain Dealer
Jim Renacci (withdrawn)

Organizations

- Asian American GOP Coalition
- Bikers for Trump
- Citizens for Trump

Notable individuals

- Corey Lewandowski, former campaign manager of Donald Trump's 2016 presidential campaign
Mary Taylor

U.S. senators

- Ted Cruz, U.S. senator (R-TX)
- Steve Daines, U.S. senator (R-MT)
- Mike Lee, U.S. senator (R-UT)
- Rand Paul, U.S. senator (R-KY)

Governors

- John Kasich, Ohio governor and 2016 presidential candidate

Lieutenant governors

- Billy Nungesser, lieutenant governor of Louisiana

Statewide officials

- Ken Blackwell, former secretary of state of Ohio

Notable individuals

- Michele Bachmann, former U.S. representative from Minnesota's 6th Congressional District
- Mike Huckabee, former governor of Arkansas, former lieutenant governor of Arkansas
- Seth Morgan, former Ohio state representative

State senators

- Louis Terhar

State representatives

- Tom Brinkman
- Mark Romanchuk
- Bill Seitz
- Andy Thompson

County parties

- Miami County Republican Party

Party leaders

- Matt Gilmore, chair of Mercer County Republican Party

Organizations

- Family Research Council
- Ohio Tea Party
- Ohioans for Concealed Carry
- Republican Liberty Caucus of Ohio
- Totally Engaged Americans

=== Polling ===
Poll source	Date(s) administered	Sample size	Margin of error	Mike DeWine	Mary Taylor	Other	Undecided
Baldwin Wallace University	April 24 – May 2, 2018	323	–	52%	24%	–	25%
Remington Research Group (R-Taylor)	April 10, 2018	1,064	± 3.1%	42%	32%	–	26%
Fallon Research	April 4–7, 2018	502	± 4.4%	43%	26%	–	31%
SurveyUSA	March 16–20, 2018	541	± 5.8%	50%	18%	–	31%
TRZ Communications (R-WTPC)	February 17, 2018	1,152	± 3.0%	61%	39%	–	–
TRZ Communications (R-WTPC)	February 17, 2018	1,152	± 3.0%	35%	16%	15%	33%
Fallon Research	January 16–19, 2018	286	–	54%	14%	–	32%

Hypothetical polling

Poll source	Date(s) administered	Sample size	Margin of error	Mike DeWine	Jon Husted	Jim Renacci	Mary Taylor	Undecided
Axis Research (R-Taylor)	August 13–15, 2017	602	± 4.1%	36%	20%	8%	17%	19%
The Tarrance Group (R)	July 24–26, 2017	800	± 3.5%	42%	18%	5%	11%	24%
The Tarrance Group (R)	July 24–26, 2017	800	± 3.5%	49%	29%	–	–	21%
Luntz Global	June 12, 2017	500	± 4.4%	27%	13%	3%	8%	–
Gravis Marketing	April 27 – May 2, 2017	686	± 2.7%	31%	14%	6%	10%	40%
The Tarrance Group (R)	January 23–26, 2017	800	± 3.5%	47%	18%	4%	10%	22%

=== Results ===
Results by county: DeWine: 50–60%; 60–70%; 70–80%; Taylor: 50–60%

Republican primary results
Party	Candidate	Votes	%
Republican	Mike DeWine; Jon Husted	499,639	59.84
Republican	Mary Taylor; Nathan Estruth	335,328	40.16
Total votes		834,967	100.0

== Democratic primary ==
=== Candidates ===
==== Nominated ====
- Richard Cordray, former director of the Consumer Financial Protection Bureau, former Ohio attorney general, former Ohio state treasurer, nominee for OH-15 in 1992, nominee for attorney general in 1998 and 2010, and candidate for U.S. Senate in 2000
  - Running mate: Betty Sutton, former U.S. representative

==== Eliminated in primary ====
- Larry Ealy, former male stripper and candidate for governor in 2014
  - Running mate: Jeffrey Lynn
- Dennis Kucinich, former U.S. representative, former mayor of Cleveland, candidate for secretary of state in 1982, and candidate for president of the United States in 2004 and 2008
  - Running mate: Tara Samples, Akron city councilwoman
- Bill O'Neill, justice of the Ohio Supreme Court and nominee for OH-14 in 2008 and 2010
  - Running mate: Chantelle Lewis, elementary school principal and former East Cleveland City councilwoman
- Paul Ray
  - Running mate: Jerry Schroeder
- Joe Schiavoni, state senator and former minority leader of the Ohio Senate
  - Running mate: Stephanie Dodd, State Board of Education member

==== Failed to qualify for ballot ====
- Jon Heavey, physician
- Dave Kiefer, former Wayne County Commissioner and Republican candidate for state representative in 2016

==== Withdrew ====
- Connie Pillich, former state representative and nominee for Ohio state treasurer in 2014 (endorsed Cordray)
  - Running mate: Scott Schertzer, mayor of Marion, Ohio
- Betty Sutton, former U.S. representative (ran for lieutenant governor)
- Nan Whaley, mayor of Dayton (endorsed Cordray)

=== Endorsements ===
Richard Cordray

U.S. senators

- Elizabeth Warren, Massachusetts

U.S. representatives

- Steve Driehaus, former U.S. representative from Ohio
- Marcia Fudge, U.S representative from Ohio
- Marcy Kaptur, U.S. representative from Ohio

Governors

- Ted Strickland, former governor of Ohio

State representatives

- Peter Lawson Jones (former)
- Matt Lundy (former)
- Connie Pillich (former), nominee for Ohio state treasurer in 2014, candidate for governor in 2018
- Stephen Slesnick (former)
- Fred Strahorn, minority leader of the Ohio House of Representatives

Mayors

- Richard Bain, Pepper Pike
- Annette Blackwell, Maple Heights
- John Cranley, Cincinnati
- Tim DeGeeter, Parma
- Dean DePiero, Parma (former)
- Carty Finkbeiner, Toledo (former)
- Michael Gammella, Brook Park
- Andrew Ginther, Columbus
- Frank G. Jackson, Cleveland
- Wade Kapszukiewicz, Toledo
- Chase Ritenauer, Lorain
- Carol Roe, Cleveland Heights
- Don Walters, Cuyahoga Falls
- Nan Whaley, Dayton

City council members

- Kevin Bishop, Cleveland
- Anthony Brancatelli, Cleveland
- Phyllis Cleveland, Cleveland
- Paul Colavecchio, Cuyahoga Falls
- Kevin Conwell, Cleveland
- Jeff Fusco, Akron
- Anthony Hairston, Cleveland
- Basheer Jones, Cleveland
- Brian Kazy, Cleveland
- Martin Keane, Cleveland
- Kevin Kelley, Cleveland
- Kerry McCormack, Cleveland
- Mary Nichols-Rhodes, Cuyahoga Falls
- P.G. Sittenfeld, Cincinnati
- Margo Somerville, Akron
- Matt Zone, Cleveland

County officials

- Dallas Baldwin, Franklin County sheriff
- Steve Barry, Summit County sheriff
- Willis Blackshear, Montgomery County recorder
- Armond Budish, county executive of Cuyahoga County, Ohio; former speaker of the Ohio House of Representatives
- John Donofrio, Summit County treasurer (former)
- John Ferraro, Stark County prosecutor
- Ted Kalo, Lorain County commissioner
- Lori Kokoski, Lorain County commissioner
- Sandra Kurt, Summit County clerk
- Judy Nedwick, Lorain County recorder
- Tom Orlando, Lorain County clerk
- Aftab Pureval, Hamilton County clerk
- Sherri Bevan Walsh, Summit County prosecuting attorney
- Dennis Will, Lorain County prosecutor

Labor unions

- AFL–CIO
- OFT – Ohio Federation of Teachers
- Ohio State Association of Plumbers and Pipefitters
- SEIU – Service Employees International Union

Organizations

- Franklin County Democratic Party
- Lorain County Democratic Party
- NARAL Pro-Choice Ohio
- Ohio Legislative Black Caucus
- Students for Gun Legislation

Individuals

- Valerie Jarrett, senior advisor to President Barack Obama
- Jerry Springer, talk show host, former mayor of Cincinnati, nominee for OH-02 in 1970 and candidate for governor in 1982
- Mary Ellen Withrow, former U.S. treasurer

Newspapers

- Akron Beacon Journal
- Kenyon Collegian
- The Vindicator
Dennis Kucinich

Organizations

- Cuyahoga County Progressive Caucus
- National Nurses United
- Our Revolution, progressive organization started from Bernie Sanders' 2016 presidential campaign

Governors

- Jesse Ventura, former governor of Minnesota

U.S. representatives

- Tulsi Gabbard
- Alan Grayson (former)

State senators

- Nina Turner (former)

County officials

- Todd Portune, Hamilton County commissioner

City council members

- Chris Seelbach, Cincinnati

Individuals

- Jimmy Dore, comedian and political commentator
- Josh Fox, filmmaker and environmental activist
- Danny Glover, actor, film director and political activist
- Robert F. Kennedy Jr, environmental attorney, activist, and son of Robert F. Kennedy
- Dave Matthews, musician and actor
- Richard Stallman, hacktivist

Newspapers

- The Plain Dealer
Joe Schiavoni

Political organizations

- Democratic Progressives of Ohio
- Mahoning County Democratic Party
- Trumbull County Democratic Party

Labor unions

- Canton Professional Educators' Association
- Pickaway Dems – Citizens in Action
- UWUA – Utility Workers Union of America
- Western Reserve Building & Construction Trades Council

Individuals

- Ed O'Neill, actor
Connie Pillich (withdrawn)

Governors

- Ed Rendell, former governor of Pennsylvania and former Democratic National Committee chairman

State representatives

- Kathleen Chandler (former)
- Catherine Ingram
- Brigid Kelly

Mayors

- Jim Brown, Lockland
- Charles Johnson, Forest Park
- Dick Mavis, Mount Vernon
- LaVerne Mitchell, Lincoln Heights (former)
- Earl Schmidt, Reading (former)
- John Smith, Silverton
- James C. Wolf, Mount Healthy

Individuals

- Denise Driehaus, Hamilton County commissioner and former state representative
- David S. Mann, vice mayor of Cincinnati, former mayor of Cincinnati, and former U.S. representative
- Alice Robie Resnick, former justice of the Supreme Court of Ohio

Labor unions

- Cincinnati Building Trades
- UNITE HERE Local 24

Organizations

- EMILY's List
- VoteVets.org
Betty Sutton (withdrawn)

U.S. representatives

- Marcia Fudge, Ohio
- Marcy Kaptur, Ohio

Labor unions

- Akron Education Association
- Cleveland Building & Construction Trades Council
- IAFF – International Association of Fire Fighters Local 1690
- IBEW – International Brotherhood of Electrical Workers Local 38
- International Brotherhood of Boilermakers Local Lodge 900
- International Longshoremen's Association, AFL-CIO Local 1768
- IUPAT – International Union of Painters and Allied Trades District Council 6
- Laborers Local 860, Cleveland
- Lorain Professional Firefighters Local 267
- Plumbers & Pipefitters Local Union #219
- Teamsters Local 436
Nan Whaley (withdrawn)

Mayors

- Dick Church, Jr., Miamisburg
- Warren Copeland, Springfield
- John Cranley, Cincinnati
- Luke Feeney, Chillicothe
- Ben Kessler, Bexley
- Steven Patterson, Athens
- David Seagraves, Brookville
- Cheryl Stephens, Cleveland Heights

City council members

- Elizabeth Brown, Columbus
- Jaiza Page, Columbus
- Lindsay Webb, Toledo

County officials

- Judy Dodge, Montgomery County commissioner
- Dan Foley, Montgomery County commissioner
- Paul Gruner, Montgomery County engineer
- Larry Hartlaub, Ottawa County auditor
- Mat Heck, Jr., Montgomery County prosecuting attorney
- Karl Keith, Montgomery County auditor
- Debbie Lieberman, Montgomery County commissioner
- Carolyn Rice, Montgomery County treasurer
- Liz Walters, Summit County Council

Labor unions

- Dayton Building & Construction Trades Council
- IUE-CWA – International Union of Electronic, Electrical, Salaried, Machine and Furniture Workers
- Ohio State Council of Machinists

=== Polling ===
Poll source	Date(s) administered	Sample size	Margin of error	Richard Cordray	Dennis Kucinich	Bill O'Neill	Connie Pillich	Joe Schiavoni	Other	Undecided
Baldwin Wallace University	April 24 – May 2, 2018	333	–	31%	15%	6%	–	6%	–	41%
Fallon Research	April 4–7, 2018	500	± 4.4%	28%	13%	3%	–	5%	1% (Note: Paul Ray 1%, Larry Ealy 0%)	51%
SurveyUSA	March 16–20, 2018	509	± 5.3%	21%	21%	4%	5%	–	3% (Note: Paul Ray 2%, Larry Ealy 1%)	46%
Fallon Research	January 16–19, 2018	248	–	23%	16%	3%	2%	4%	–	52%

Hypothetical polling

Poll source	Date(s) administered	Sample size	Margin of error	Richard Cordray	Connie Pillich	Joe Schiavoni	Betty Sutton	Nan Whaley	Undecided
Luntz Global	June 12, 2017	500	± 4.4%	17%	9%	20%	21%	10%	–
Gravis Marketing	April 27 – May 2, 2017	558	± 2.7%	–	8%	12%	13%	–	67%

=== Results ===
Results by county: Cordray: 40–50%; 50–60%; 60–70%; 70–80%; Schiavoni: 40–50%; 60–70%

Democratic primary results
Party	Candidate	Votes	%
Democratic	Richard Cordray; Betty Sutton	428,159	62.16
Democratic	Dennis Kucinich; Tara Samples	158,284	22.98
Democratic	Joe Schiavoni; Stephanie Dodd	63,131	9.17
Democratic	Bill O'Neill; Chantelle Lewis	22,667	3.29
Democratic	Paul Ray; Jerry Schroeder	9,536	1.38
Democratic	Larry Ealy; Jeffrey Lynn	7,011	1.02
Total votes		688,788	100.0

== Libertarian primary ==
=== Candidates ===
==== Nominated ====
- Travis Irvine, filmmaker and writer
  - Running mate: Todd Grayson

==== Withdrew ====
- Bruce Jaynes, entrepreneur
- Stephen Quinn, student

== Green primary ==
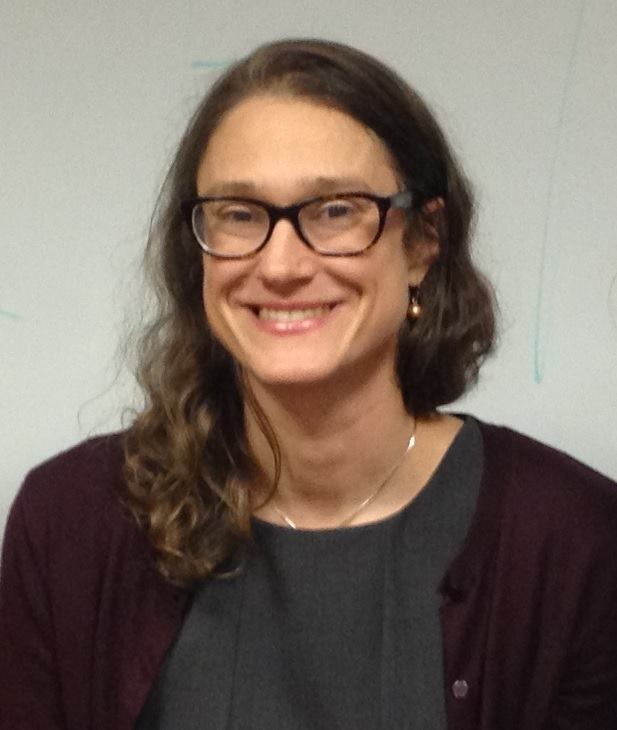
Gadell-Newton

=== Candidates ===
==== Nominated ====
- Constance Gadell-Newton, attorney, co-chair of the Ohio Green Party and nominee for the State House in 2016
  - Running mate: Brett R. Joseph

== General election ==
=== Candidates ===
- Richard Cordray (Democratic), former director of the Consumer Financial Protection Bureau, former Ohio attorney general and former Ohio state treasurer
  - Running mate: Betty Sutton, former U.S. representative
- Mike DeWine (Republican), Ohio attorney general and former U.S. senator
  - Running mate: Jon A. Husted, secretary of state of Ohio and former speaker of the Ohio House of Representatives
- Constance Gadell-Newton (Green), attorney, co-chair of the Ohio Green Party and nominee for the State House in 2016
  - Running mate: Brett R. Joseph, attorney, educator and small businessman
- Travis Irvine (Libertarian)
  - Running mate: Todd Grayson, former Perrysburg city councilman

=== Endorsements ===
Richard Cordray (D)

Former federal officials

- Joe Biden, 47th vice president of the United States
- Eric Holder, 82nd United States attorney general
- Valerie Jarrett, former director of the Office of Public Engagement and Intergovernmental Affairs
- Barack Obama, 44th president of the United States

U.S. senators

- Cory Booker, New Jersey
- Sherrod Brown, Ohio
- Kamala Harris, California
- Elizabeth Warren, Massachusetts

U.S. representatives

- Steve Driehaus, U.S. representative (OH-1) (former)
- Marcia Fudge, U.S representative (OH-11)
- Marcy Kaptur, U.S. representative (OH-9)
- Tim Ryan, U.S. representative (OH-13)

Governors

- Jay Inslee, governor of Washington
- Terry McAuliffe, former governor of Virginia
- Ted Strickland, former governor of Ohio

State representatives

- Peter Lawson Jones (former)
- Matt Lundy (former)
- Connie Pillich (former), nominee for Ohio state treasurer in 2014, candidate for governor in 2018
- Stephen Slesnick (former)
- Fred Strahorn, minority leader of the Ohio House of Representatives

Mayors

- Richard Bain, Pepper Pike
- Annette Blackwell, Maple Heights
- John Cranley, Cincinnati
- Tim DeGeeter, Parma
- Dean DePiero, Parma (former)
- Carty Finkbeiner, Toledo (former)
- Michael Gammella, Brook Park
- Andrew Ginther, Columbus
- Frank G. Jackson, Cleveland
- Wade Kapszukiewicz, Toledo
- Chase Ritenauer, Lorain
- Carol Roe, Cleveland Heights
- Don Walters, Cuyahoga Falls
- Nan Whaley, Dayton

City council members

- Kevin Bishop, Cleveland
- Anthony Brancatelli, Cleveland
- Phyllis Cleveland, Cleveland
- Paul Colavecchio, Cuyahoga Falls
- Kevin Conwell, Cleveland
- Jeff Fusco, Akron
- Anthony Hairston, Cleveland
- Basheer Jones, Cleveland
- Brian Kazy, Cleveland
- Martin Keane, Cleveland
- Kevin Kelley, Cleveland
- Kerry McCormack, Cleveland
- Mary Nichols-Rhodes, Cuyahoga Falls
- P.G. Sittenfeld, Cincinnati
- Margo Somerville, Akron
- Matt Zone, Cleveland

County officials

- Dallas Baldwin, Franklin County sheriff
- Steve Barry, Summit County sheriff
- Willis Blackshear, Montgomery County recorder
- Armond Budish, county executive of Cuyahoga County, Ohio; former speaker of the Ohio House of Representatives
- John Donofrio, Summit County treasurer (former)
- John Ferraro, Stark County prosecutor
- Ted Kalo, Lorain County commissioner
- Lori Kokoski, Lorain County commissioner
- Sandra Kurt, Summit County clerk
- Judy Nedwick, Lorain County recorder
- Tom Orlando, Lorain County clerk
- Aftab Pureval, Hamilton County clerk
- Sherri Bevan Walsh, Summit County prosecuting attorney
- Dennis Will, Lorain County prosecutor

Individuals

- Kelley Deal, musician
- John Legend, singer
- Jerry Springer, talk show host, former mayor of Cincinnati, nominee for OH-02 in 1970 and candidate for governor in 1982

Labor unions

- AFL–CIO
- FOP – Fraternal Order of Police of Ohio
- OEA – Ohio Education Association
- OFT – Ohio Federation of Teachers
- Ohio State Association Union of Plumbers and Pipefitters
- SEIU – Service Employees International Union
- UAW – United Automobile Workers
- USW – United Steelworkers

Organizations

- Democratic Progressives of Ohio
- Human Rights Campaign
- NARAL Pro-Choice Ohio
- Ohio Legislative Black Caucus
Mike DeWine (R)

Federal officials

- Mike Pence, vice president of the United States
- Donald Trump, president of the United States

Governors

- John Kasich, governor of Ohio

U.S. senators

- Lindsey Graham, South Carolina
- Rob Portman, Ohio

U.S. representatives

- Troy Balderson, U.S. representative (OH-12)
- Steve Stivers, U.S. representative (OH-15)
- Mike Turner, U.S. representative (OH-10)

State senators

- Kevin Bacon
- Bill Beagle
- David Burke
- Matt Dolan
- John Eklund
- Randy Gardner (majority leader)
- Bob Hackett
- Frank Hoagland
- Jay Hottinger
- Stephanie Kunze
- Peggy Lehner
- Gayle Manning (majority whip)
- Rob McColley
- Larry Obhof (president)
- Scott Oelslager
- Bob Peterson (president pro tempore)
- Joe Uecker

State representatives

- Sarah LaTourette (assistant majority leader)
- Bill Patmon (Democratic)
- Tom Patton (majority whip)
- Bill Reineke (assistant majority whip)
- Cliff Rosenberger (speaker)
- Gary Scherer
- Kirk Schuring (speaker pro tempore)

Individuals

- Julie Jakmides, Alliance councilwoman
- David Johnson, chair of the Columbiana County Republican Party
- Richard K. Jones, Butler County sheriff
- Dave Levacy, Fairfield County commissioner
- Amy Murray, Cincinnati City Council member
- Gerard Neugebauer, Green mayor
- Rick Santorum, former United States senator from Pennsylvania and candidate for president of the United States in 2012 and 2016
- JD Vance, author of Hillbilly Elegy

Labor unions

- IKORCC – Indiana/Kentucky/Ohio Regional Council of the Carpenters
- IUOE – International Union of Operating Engineers

Organizations

- Buckeye Firearms Association
- National Federation of Independent Business
- NRA Political Victory Fund
- Ohio Chamber of Commerce
- Ohio Manufacturers' Association
- Ohio Society of CPAs
- Ohio State Medical Association

Newspapers

- The Intelligencer
- Tribune Chronicle

=== Debates ===
Host network/sponsors	Location	Date	Link(s)	Possible participants			
Host network/sponsors	Location	Date	Link(s)	Richard Cordray (D)	Mike DeWine (R)	Travis Irvine (L)	Constance Gadell-Newton (G)
WHIO-TV	University of Dayton	September 19, 2018		Invited	Invited	Not Invited	Not Invited
WCMH-TV	Marietta College	October 1, 2018		Invited	Invited	Not Invited	Not Invited
Ohio Debate Commission	Cleveland State University	October 8, 2018		Invited	Invited	Not Invited	Not Invited

=== Predictions ===
Source	Ranking	As of
The Cook Political Report	Tossup	October 26, 2018
The Washington Post	Tossup	November 5, 2018
FiveThirtyEight	Lean D (flip)	November 5, 2018
Rothenberg Political Report	Tossup	November 1, 2018
Sabato's Crystal Ball	Lean D (flip)	November 5, 2018
RealClearPolitics	Tossup	November 4, 2018
Daily Kos	Tossup	November 5, 2018
Fox News (Note: The Fox News Midterm Power Rankings uniquely does not contain a category for Safe/Solid races)	Tossup	November 5, 2018
Politico	Tossup	November 5, 2018
Governing	Tossup	November 5, 2018

=== Polling ===
Poll source	Date(s) administered	Sample size	Margin of error	Mike DeWine (R)	Richard Cordray (D)	Travis Irvine (L)	Constance Gadell- Newton (G)	Other	Undecided
Change Research	November 2–4, 2018	923	–	43%	48%	5%	1%	–	–
The Trafalgar Group (R)	November 2–4, 2018	1,948	± 2.2%	42%	46%	–	–	7%	5%
Research Co.	November 1–3, 2018	450	± 4.6%	44%	44%	–	–	2%	10%
Cygnal (R)	October 30–31, 2018	503	± 4.4%	43%	43%	3%	2%	–	9%
Gravis Marketing	October 29–30, 2018	789	± 3.5%	43%	48%	–	–	–	9%
Emerson College	October 26–28, 2018	566	± 4.3%	46%	49%	–	–	2%	3%
Baldwin Wallace University	October 19–27, 2018	1,051	± 3.8%	39%	39%	4%	2%	–	16%
Baldwin Wallace University	October 19–27, 2018	1,051	± 3.8%	41%	42%	–	–	–	17%
Suffolk University	October 4–8, 2018	500	± 4.4%	40%	46%	2%	0%	0% (Note: Richard Duncan (write-in), Rebecca Ayers (write-in), and Renea Turner (write-in) with 0%)	10%
Baldwin Wallace University	September 8 – October 8, 2018	1,017	± 3.5%	40%	37%	4%	3%	–	15%
Baldwin Wallace University	September 8 – October 8, 2018	1,017	± 3.5%	42%	39%	–	–	–	19%
University of Akron	September 10 – October 4, 2018	1,000	± 3.0%	37%	36%	–	–	–	27%
Ipsos	September 13–21, 2018	1,074	± 3.0%	45%	44%	–	–	2%	9%
Triton Polling & Research (R)	September 18–20, 2018	1,003	± 3.1%	49%	44%	–	–	–	8%
Marist College	September 16–20, 2018	564 LV	± 5.0%	44%	44%	3%	3%	<1%	6%
Marist College	September 16–20, 2018	564 LV	± 5.0%	47%	47%	–	–	1%	6%
Marist College	September 16–20, 2018	796 RV	± 4.2%	42%	43%	4%	4%	1%	6%
Marist College	September 16–20, 2018	796 RV	± 4.2%	47%	47%	–	–	1%	6%
Baldwin Wallace University	September 5–15, 2018	1,048	± 3.6%	42%	37%	–	–	–	21%
Morning Consult	September 2–11, 2018	1,592	± 2.0%	39%	38%	–	–	–	23%
Change Research (D-Innovation Ohio)	August 31 – September 4, 2018	822	± 3.0%	45%	43%	6%	3%	–	–
Change Research (D-Innovation Ohio)	August 31 – September 4, 2018	822	± 3.0%	43%	43%	–	–	–	14%
TRZ Communications (R-WTPC)	June 30 – July 10, 2018	1,485	± 3.0%	42%	38%	–	–	3%	17%
Marist College	June 17–22, 2018	778	± 4.4%	46%	42%	–	–	2%	11%
Quinnipiac University	June 7–12, 2018	1,082	± 3.7%	40%	42%	–	–	2%	14%
Suffolk University	June 6–11, 2018	500	± 4.4%	36%	43%	–	3%	2%	16%
America First Action (R)	May 29–31, 2018	400	± 4.9%	45%	38%	–	–	–	10%
Fallon Research	May 21–25, 2018	800	± 3.5%	40%	34%	–	1%	3% (Note: Colin Hill (I) with 3%)	22%
Public Policy Polling (D-Ohio Democratic Party)	May 6–7, 2018	618	± 3.9%	39%	44%	–	–	–	17%
Public Policy Polling (D-Ohio Democratic Party)	April 25–26, 2018	770	± 3.5%	38%	47%	–	–	–	14%
SurveyUSA	March 16–20, 2018	1,408	± 3.5%	47%	39%	–	–	–	14%
Public Policy Polling (D-Ohio Democratic Party)	January 22–23, 2018	585	± 4.1%	45%	44%	–	–	–	11%
Fallon Research	January 16–19, 2018	801	± 3.5%	49%	28%	–	–	–	23%
Luntz Global	June 12, 2017	500	± 4.4%	55%	31%	–	–	–	14%

Hypothetical polling

with DeWine and Kucinich

Poll source	Date(s) administered	Sample size	Margin of error	Mike DeWine (R)	Dennis Kucinich (D)	Undecided
SurveyUSA	March 16–20, 2018	1,408	± 3.5%	51%	38%	12%
Public Policy Polling (D-Ohio Democratic Party)	January 22–23, 2018	585	± 4.1%	48%	37%	14%

with DeWine and Pillich

Poll source	Date(s) administered	Sample size	Margin of error	Mike DeWine (R)	Connie Pillich (D)	Undecided
Public Policy Polling (D-Ohio Democratic Party)	January 22–23, 2018	585	± 4.1%	47%	35%	18%

with Jon Husted

Poll source	Date(s) administered	Sample size	Margin of error	Jon Husted (R)	Richard Cordray (D)	Undecided
Luntz Global	June 12, 2017	500	± 4.4%	47%	35%	18%

with generic Republican and Democrat

Poll source	Date(s) administered	Sample size	Margin of error	Generic Republican	Generic Democrat	Undecided
Baldwin Wallace University	February 28 – March 9, 2018	1,011	± 3.0%	37%	32%	–

=== Results ===
Ohio gubernatorial election, 2018
Party	Candidate	Votes	%	±%
Republican	Mike DeWine; Jon Husted	2,235,825	50.40%	−13.24%
Democratic	Richard Cordray; Betty Sutton	2,070,046	46.67%	+13.64%
Libertarian	Travis Irvine; Todd Grayson	80,055	1.80%	N/A
Green	Constance Gadell-Newton; Brett Joseph	49,536	1.12%	−2.21%
Write-in		358	0.00%	N/A
Total votes		4,435,820	100.00%	N/A
Republican hold				

==== By county ====
County	Mike DeWine Republican		Richard Cordray Democratic		Various candidates Other parties		Margin		Total votes cast
County	#	%	#	%	#	%	#	%	Total votes cast
Adams	6,302	72.03%	2,184	24.96%	263	3.01%	4,118	47.07%	8,749
Allen	24,200	67.29%	10,825	30.10%	941	2.61%	13,375	37.18%	35,966
Ashland	12,846	68.63%	5,157	27.55%	714	3.82%	7,689	41.08%	18,717
Ashtabula	17,184	53.31%	13,668	42.40%	1,382	4.29%	3,516	10.91%	32,234
Athens	7,566	33.41%	14,261	62.98%	816	3.61%	-6,695	-29.57%	22,643
Auglaize	14,902	77.78%	3,676	19.19%	582	3.03%	11,226	58.59%	19,160
Belmont	15,614	62.74%	8,686	34.90%	588	2.36%	6,928	27.84%	24,888
Brown	10,668	71.84%	3,683	24.80%	499	3.36%	6,985	47.04%	14,850
Butler	82,771	61.07%	48,890	36.07%	3,879	2.86%	33,881	25.00%	135,540
Carroll	6,772	65.73%	3,114	30.23%	416	4.04%	3,658	35.50%	10,302
Champaign	10,023	67.54%	4,197	28.28%	619	4.17%	5,826	39.26%	14,839
Clark	27,967	58.12%	18,537	38.52%	1,613	3.36%	9,430	19.60%	48,117
Clermont	53,508	66.77%	23,847	29.76%	2,788	3.47%	29,661	37.01%	80,143
Clinton	10,884	72.30%	3,647	24.23%	523	3.47%	7,237	48.07%	15,054
Columbiana	22,846	64.12%	11,625	32.63%	1,159	3.25%	11,221	31.49%	35,630
Coshocton	7,768	65.17%	3,738	31.36%	414	3.47%	4,030	33.81%	11,920
Crawford	9,786	67.45%	4,202	28.96%	520	3.59%	5,584	38.49%	14,508
Cuyahoga	150,848	31.06%	323,276	66.57%	11,510	2.37%	-172,428	-35.51%	485,634
Darke	15,161	77.15%	3,820	19.44%	671	3.41%	11,341	57.71%	19,652
Defiance	8,834	63.31%	4,649	33.32%	470	3.37%	4,185	29.99%	13,953
Delaware	53,674	56.35%	39,655	41.64%	1,915	2.01%	14,019	14.71%	95,244
Erie	14,577	48.14%	14,494	47.87%	1,207	3.99%	83	0.27%	30,278
Fairfield	35,445	59.31%	22,702	37.99%	1,612	2.70%	12,743	21.32%	59,759
Fayette	5,955	69.72%	2,381	27.88%	205	2.40%	3,574	41.84%	8,541
Franklin	166,057	34.07%	310,205	63.65%	11,089	2.28%	-144,148	-29.58%	487,351
Fulton	10,467	64.19%	5,275	32.35%	565	3.46%	5,192	31.84%	16,307
Gallia	6,820	70.11%	2,707	27.83%	200	2.06%	4,113	42.28%	9,727
Geauga	25,468	59.82%	15,887	37.32%	1,218	2.86%	9,581	22.50%	42,573
Greene	42,173	61.20%	24,557	35.63%	2,184	3.17%	17,616	25.57%	68,914
Guernsey	8,242	65.20%	3,965	31.36%	435	3.44%	4,277	33.84%	12,642
Hamilton	148,272	43.65%	181,979	53.57%	9,433	2.78%	-33,707	-9.92%	339,684
Hancock	19,112	67.23%	8,427	29.65%	887	3.12%	10,685	37.58%	28,426
Hardin	6,309	67.02%	2,714	28.83%	391	4.15%	3,595	38.19%	9,414
Harrison	3,851	66.11%	1,780	30.56%	194	3.33%	2,071	35.55%	5,825
Henry	7,255	67.58%	3,091	28.79%	389	3.63%	4,164	38.79%	10,735
Highland	9,942	73.10%	3,222	23.69%	436	3.21%	6,720	49.41%	13,600
Hocking	5,988	60.16%	3,604	36.21%	362	3.63%	2,384	23.95%	9,954
Holmes	7,031	79.16%	1,595	17.96%	256	2.88%	5,436	61.20%	8,882
Huron	11,536	60.93%	6,517	34.42%	881	4.65%	5,019	26.51%	18,934
Jackson	6,913	67.69%	3,047	29.84%	252	2.47%	3,866	37.85%	10,212
Jefferson	14,863	60.52%	8,890	36.20%	806	3.28%	5,973	24.32%	24,559
Knox	14,726	65.24%	7,126	31.57%	719	3.19%	7,600	33.67%	22,571
Lake	50,783	53.41%	41,355	43.49%	2,947	3.10%	9,428	9.92%	95,085
Lawrence	13,510	65.75%	6,557	31.91%	482	2.34%	6,953	33.84%	20,549
Licking	41,647	60.61%	25,168	36.63%	1,893	2.76%	16,479	23.98%	68,708
Logan	11,823	71.74%	3,989	24.21%	668	4.05%	7,834	47.53%	16,480
Lorain	52,268	45.63%	58,846	51.37%	3,444	3.00%	-6,578	-5.74%	114,558
Lucas	57,004	37.37%	90,232	59.16%	5,294	3.47%	-33,228	-21.79%	152,530
Madison	9,084	65.53%	4,371	31.53%	407	2.94%	4,713	34.00%	13,862
Mahoning	38,689	42.65%	49,740	54.83%	2,290	2.52%	-11,051	-12.18%	90,719
Marion	12,631	61.34%	7,176	34.85%	785	3.81%	5,455	26.49%	20,592
Medina	43,650	57.92%	29,529	39.18%	2,182	2.90%	14,121	18.74%	75,361
Meigs	5,383	68.44%	2,290	29.12%	192	2.44%	3,093	39.32%	7,865
Mercer	13,697	79.02%	3,161	18.24%	476	2.74%	10,536	60.78%	17,334
Miami	29,014	69.36%	11,314	27.05%	1,502	3.59%	17,700	42.31%	41,830
Monroe	3,219	62.68%	1,760	34.27%	157	3.05%	1,459	28.41%	5,136
Montgomery	100,021	48.55%	99,812	48.45%	6,197	3.00%	209	0.10%	206,030
Morgan	3,297	64.57%	1,663	32.57%	146	2.86%	1,634	32.00%	5,106
Morrow	9,127	69.10%	3,601	27.26%	480	3.64%	5,526	41.84%	13,208
Muskingum	18,622	63.92%	9,653	33.13%	860	2.95%	8,969	30.79%	29,135
Noble	3,146	67.89%	1,338	28.87%	150	3.24%	1,808	39.02%	4,634
Ottawa	9,880	54.10%	7,695	42.14%	687	3.76%	2,185	11.96%	18,262
Paulding	4,705	68.34%	1,965	28.54%	215	3.12%	2,740	39.80%	6,885
Perry	7,418	63.99%	3,754	32.38%	420	3.63%	3,664	31.61%	11,592
Pickaway	13,230	66.18%	6,219	31.11%	541	2.71%	7,011	35.07%	19,990
Pike	5,360	60.46%	3,237	36.51%	269	3.03%	2,123	23.95%	8,866
Portage	29,563	48.73%	28,679	47.27%	2,427	4.00%	884	1.46%	60,669
Preble	11,389	71.98%	3,678	23.24%	756	4.78%	7,711	48.74%	15,823
Putnam	11,875	79.81%	2,672	17.96%	332	2.23%	9,203	61.85%	14,879
Richland	28,381	63.51%	14,827	33.18%	1,476	3.31%	13,554	30.33%	44,684
Ross	13,987	59.65%	8,760	37.36%	700	2.99%	5,227	22.29%	23,447
Sandusky	12,373	55.95%	8,721	39.44%	1,019	4.61%	3,652	16.51%	22,113
Scioto	14,499	60.81%	8,806	36.93%	540	2.26%	5,693	23.88%	23,845
Seneca	11,521	61.45%	6,457	34.44%	772	4.11%	5,064	27.01%	18,750
Shelby	13,924	74.92%	4,032	21.70%	628	3.38%	9,892	53.22%	18,584
Stark	75,121	53.75%	59,949	42.89%	4,694	3.36%	15,172	10.86%	139,764
Summit	88,088	41.56%	117,744	55.56%	6,106	2.88%	-29,656	-14.00%	211,938
Trumbull	34,139	45.65%	38,522	51.51%	2,119	2.84%	-4,383	-5.86%	74,780
Tuscarawas	19,394	60.10%	11,649	36.10%	1,225	3.80%	7,745	24.00%	32,268
Union	15,526	64.93%	7,598	31.78%	787	3.29%	7,928	33.15%	23,911
Van Wert	8,112	75.71%	2,293	21.40%	309	2.89%	5,819	54.31%	10,714
Vinton	2,561	63.08%	1,380	33.99%	119	2.93%	1,181	29.09%	4,060
Warren	66,190	66.51%	30,720	30.87%	2,611	2.62%	35,470	35.64%	99,521
Washington	15,497	66.26%	7,221	30.88%	669	2.86%	8,276	35.38%	23,387
Wayne	25,270	63.08%	13,470	33.62%	1,320	3.30%	11,800	29.46%	40,060
Williams	9,323	69.50%	3,604	26.87%	488	3.63%	5,719	42.63%	13,415
Wood	25,193	50.29%	23,051	46.01%	1,853	3.70%	2,142	4.28%	50,097
Wyandot	5,565	68.17%	2,286	28.00%	312	3.83%	3,279	40.17%	8,163
Totals	2,235,825	50.40%	2,070,046	46.67%	129,949	2.93%	165,779	3.73%	4,435,820

Counties that flipped from Democratic to Republican

- Monroe (largest city: Woodsfield)

Counties that flipped from Republican to Democratic

- Cuyahoga (largest city: Cleveland)
- Franklin (largest city: Columbus)
- Hamilton (largest city: Cincinnati)
- Lorain (largest city: Lorain)
- Lucas (largest city: Toledo)
- Mahoning (largest city: Youngstown)
- Summit (largest city: Akron)
- Trumbull (largest city: Warren)

==== By congressional district ====
DeWine won 12 of 16 congressional districts.

District	DeWine	Cordray	Representative
1st	52%	45%	Steve Chabot
2nd	54%	43%	Brad Wenstrup
3rd	28%	70%	Joyce Beatty
4th	62%	34%	Jim Jordan
5th	58%	38%	Bob Latta
6th	64%	33%	Bill Johnson
7th	59%	37%	Bob Gibbs
8th	64%	32%	Warren Davidson
9th	35%	61%	Marcy Kaptur
10th	52%	45%	Mike Turner
11th	18%	79%	Marcia Fudge
12th	52%	45%	Troy Balderson
13th	40%	57%	Tim Ryan
14th	52%	45%	David Joyce
15th	53%	45%	Steve Stivers
16th	54%	43%	Anthony Gonzalez
