= Grendell =

Grendell is a surname. Notable people with the surname include:

- Diane Grendell (born 1945), American politician from Ohio
- Tim Grendell (born 1953), American judge and politician from Ohio
