= Betty Sutton =

American politician (born 1963)

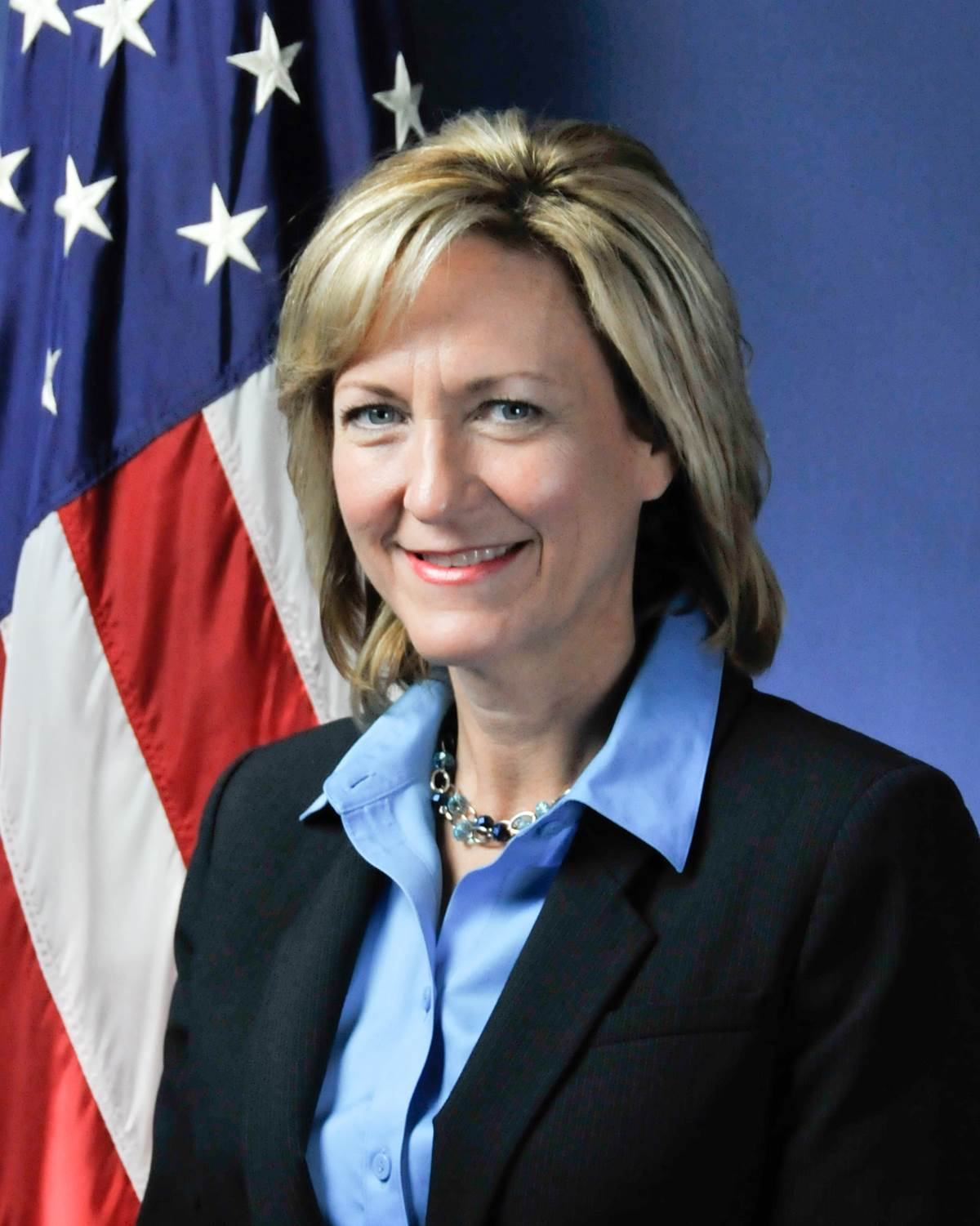

Judge of the Ohio Court of Appeals for the 9th District
- Incumbent
- Assumed office February 9, 2021
- Preceded by: Julie A. Schafer

Administrator of the Saint Lawrence Seaway Development Corporation
- In office August 13, 2013 – January 20, 2017
- President: Barack Obama
- Preceded by: Collister Johnson Jr.
- Succeeded by: Adam Schlicht

Member of the U.S. House of Representatives from Ohio's 13th district
- In office January 3, 2007 – January 3, 2013
- Preceded by: Sherrod Brown
- Succeeded by: Tim Ryan

Member of the Ohio House of Representatives from the 35th district
- In office January 3, 1993 – December 31, 2000
- Preceded by: Cliff Skeen
- Succeeded by: Bob Otterman

Personal details
- Born: Betty Sue Sutton; July 31, 1963 (age 63) Barberton, Ohio, U.S.
- Party: Democratic
- Spouse: Doug Corwon
- Education: Kent State University (BA); University of Akron (JD)

Betty Sue Sutton (born July 31, 1963) is an American politician who currently serves as a Judge of Ohio's 9th District Court of Appeals. She previously served as a U.S. representative for Ohio's 13th congressional district from 2007 to 2013. She is a member of the Democratic Party. Sutton lost her 2012 re-election campaign after she was redistricted to the 16th district, losing to fellow incumbent Jim Renacci in the Republican-leaning district.

On July 24, 2013, the White House announced that Sutton would be appointed administrator of the Saint Lawrence Seaway Development Corporation. The agency is headquartered in Washington, D.C., and is a government owned corporation that operates and maintains the U.S. portion of the St. Lawrence Seaway between the Port of Montreal and Lake Erie. On March 7, 2017, Sutton announced that she would pursue the Democratic nomination for Governor of Ohio. On January 10, 2018, Sutton dropped her bid for governor, announcing that she would instead run for Lieutenant Governor of Ohio as the running mate of Richard Cordray.

== Early life and education ==
Sutton was born and raised the youngest of six children in Barberton, Ohio, just outside of Akron. Her father worked at a boiler factory and her mother worked at a public library. She attended public schools, going on to graduate from Kent State University with a degree in political science. Sutton went on to study for a Juris Doctor at the University of Akron School of Law, where she received a Dean's Club Scholarship and earned both the American Jurisprudence Award and Federal Bar Association Award for Outstanding Performance in Constitutional Law.

== Early political career ==
During her first year of law school, Sutton successfully ran for her first public office, which earned her an at-large seat on the Barberton City Council in 1990.

A year later, Sutton was appointed to fill an at-large seat on the Summit County Council, where she served until 1992. During her second year in office, Sutton was elected vice president of the council.

In 1992, at age 29, she was the youngest woman ever to be elected to the Ohio House of Representatives. She served for eight years and could not run again due to term limits.

In 2006, Sutton successfully ran for the seat vacated by Sherrod Brown in the U.S. House of Representatives in Ohio's 13th congressional district.

== U.S. House of Representatives ==
=== Committee assignments ===
- Committee on Armed Services
  - Subcommittee on Seapower and Projection Forces
  - Subcommittee on Strategic Forces
- Committee on Natural Resources
  - Subcommittee on Energy and Mineral Resources
  - Subcommittee on National Parks, Forests and Public Lands

Before she was appointed to the Armed Services Committee and the Natural Resources Committee, Sutton sat on the Energy and Commerce Committee in the 111th Congress, and on the Judiciary Committee and Rules Committee in the 110th Congress.

=== Caucus memberships ===
- Congressional Arts Caucus
- Populist Caucus

=== 111th Congress ===
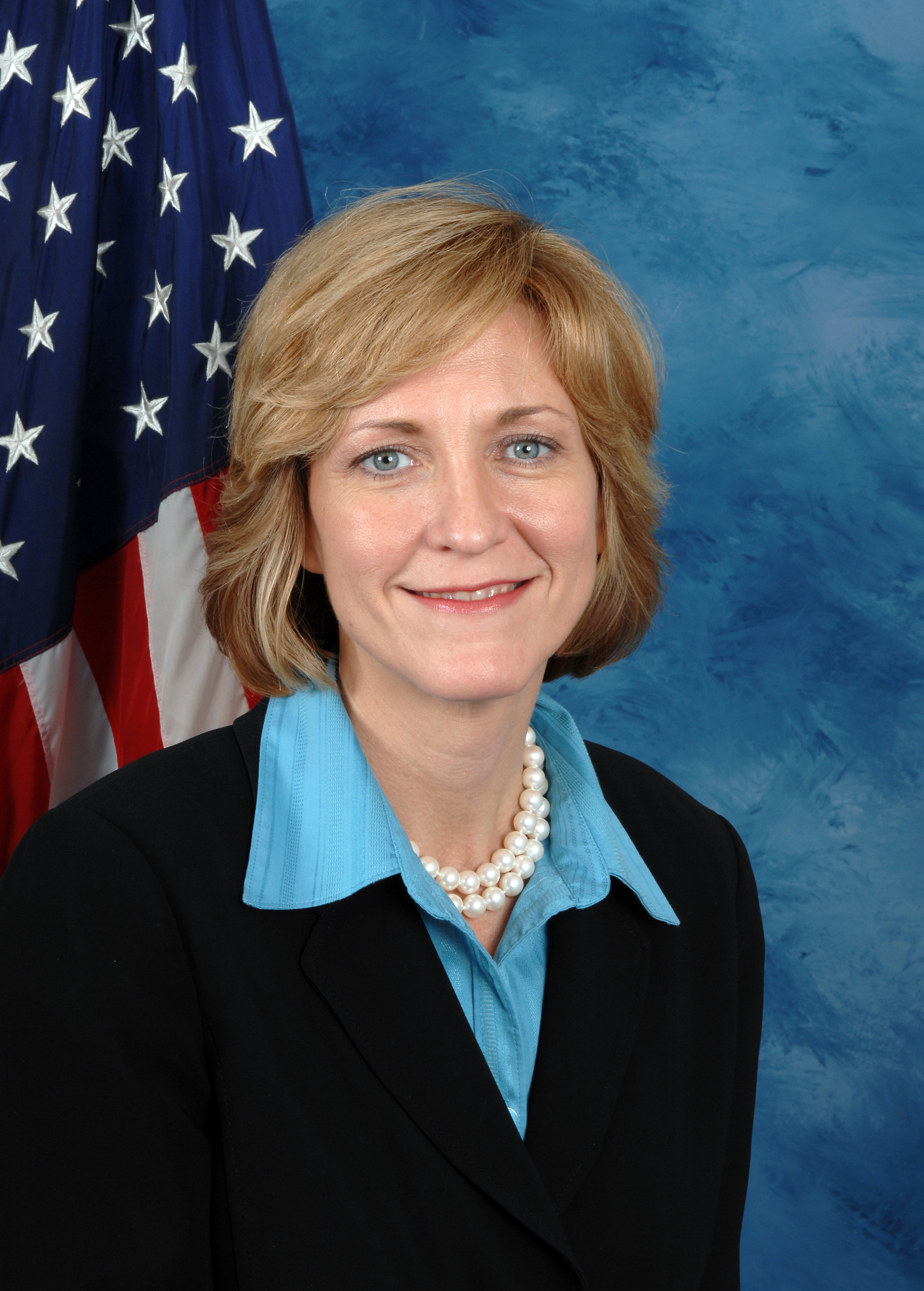
Sutton during the 110th Congress

Sutton was also recognized as a "key House architect" in the American Clean Energy and Security Act that passed the House in June 2009. An amendment she offered established the "Cash for Clunkers" program. Sutton received wide media attention in 2009 as a result of her lead sponsorship of the Consumer Assistance to Recycle and Save Act, which mandated the "Cash for Clunkers" program that went into effect during the summer of 2009. Her 2010 Republican opponent, Tom Ganley, sold 876 cars under this program. At the time, August 2009, his only complaint was about the speed of payment.

Sutton was the lead sponsor of the Josh Miller HEARTS Act, which mandates that the Department of Education provide funding to local schools for the purchase of automated external defibrillators (AEDs). The bill was named after one of Sutton's constituents, a 15-year-old honor student, football player, and wrestler from Barberton, Ohio who collapsed and died on the football field after suffering from sudden cardiac arrest.

Other bills that Sutton has sponsored include the Protect Consumers Act of 2009, which calls for stricter action to protect consumers in the event of a product's mandatory recall by the FDA, the Disability Equity Act, which eliminates the 5-month waiting period currently in place for Social Security disability benefits, and the Contractor Accountability Act, which tightens public oversight of federal expenditures.

Sutton was a member of the all-female, bipartisan softball team created by fellow House members Debbie Wasserman Schultz (D-FL) and Jo Ann Emerson (R-MO) over the summer of 2009. The team played against a team consisting of staff from the National Republican Congressional Committee, the Democratic Congressional Campaign Committee, the Republican National Committee and the Democratic National Committee, and the game benefited the Young Survival Coalition, a foundation dedicated to young women with breast cancer.

On July 16, 2009, Sutton came out in favor of a public option in any healthcare reform package.

Sutton participated in an Occupy Wall Street rally in New York in October 2011.

She supported the federal government bailout for the auto industries in 2009.

The Sunlight Foundation found that Sutton had the highest staff turnover rate in the House in 2012 with only a 19% staff retention rate. Moreover, "past interviews with The Plain Dealer over Sutton's high staff turnover rate, former Sutton staffers described her as a demanding employer who can be harsh when her expectations aren't met."

== Political campaigns ==
=== 2006 ===
After sitting Rep. Sherrod Brown of Ohio's 13th congressional district declared his intention to run against Mike DeWine for his seat in the U.S. Senate, Sutton took part in the Democratic primary for his open seat. She defeated notables such as former U.S. Rep. Thomas C. Sawyer, who had previously been redistricted out of Congress, and Capri Cafaro, who had run against Rep. Steven LaTourette in the neighboring 14th District during the previous election cycle. Sutton capitalized on the anti-corruption theme of Ohio's 2006 elections to make a strong showing late in the primary season, and held it to win the primary with the strong support of organized labor.

Sutton went on to win the November general election against Republican Craig L. Foltin, mayor of Lorain, Ohio. The Republicans had high hopes for Foltin, who was the popular Republican mayor of a heavily Democratic city, and despite the local newspaper Akron Beacon Journal's reluctant endorsement of Foltin, Sutton defeated him 61.22 percent to 38.78 percent, or 135,639 votes to 85,922 votes.

Her campaign received support from the pro-choice political action committee EMILY's List.

=== 2008 ===
Sutton won against Republican nominee David Potter.

Sutton endorsed Hillary Clinton during the 2008 Democratic primaries after Clinton won the Ohio primaries, stating that she was following the lead of her constituents. Sutton went on to campaign for Barack Obama after he secured the nomination.

=== 2010 ===
Sutton defeated Republican nominee Tom Ganley.

=== 2012 ===
The Plain Dealer reported in September 2011 that the new district map of Ohio would dismantle Sutton's district and place her home in "a largely Republican district that's being constructed to favor the re-election of freshman GOP Rep. Jim Renacci of Wadsworth." In December, Sutton filed to run against Renacci. Later that month, Roll Call reported that a poll taken at least two months earlier showed the two congress members "neck and neck at 45 percent." On The Washington Post's list of top 10 House races in 2012, Sutton's was at #8.

According to the Sunlight Foundation, from 2009 to 2011, Sutton had the highest staff turnover rate in the House. "The group's examination of House pay records for two years ending in the third quarter of 2011." reported The Plain Dealer, "found that just 19 percent of Sutton's staffers remained throughout the period. The average House office had a 64.2 percent retention rate during that time, the study found."

Renacci defeated Sutton by a 52% to 48% margin on Election Day.

=== 2018 ===
In 2017, Sutton announced she would run for Governor of Ohio to succeed term-limited Republican incumbent John Kasich. On January 10, 2018, Sutton announced that she would instead run for Lieutenant Governor of Ohio as the running mate of Richard Cordray. They were defeated by the ticket of Mike DeWine and Jon Husted.

=== 2020 ===
In 2020, Sutton announced she was running for the 9th District Court of Appeals against incumbent Republican Judge Julie Schafer. On November 3, 2020, Sutton defeated Judge Schafer to win a seat on the State Appellate Court

== Political positions ==
=== Education ===
Within the course of her eight-year tenure as part of the Ohio House of Representatives, Sutton voiced her opinion on the ever-growing importance of education. Sutton supported the remodeling and repairing of worn down schools as well as modernizing older schools. These renovations were possible through increasing the maximum amount given through the Pell Grant. By expanding the Pell Grant the 13th Congressional District of Ohio was able to prevent teacher layoffs and provided for additional funding towards special needs programs. Through The Student Aid and Fiscal Responsibility Act (SAFRA), which the Congresswomen voted for, the 13th district was allowed the ability for greater access to affordable college. The district was also given a chance to build a strong community college system. Congresswomen Sutton finally demonstrated her intense ideals on education through her participation in the Community College Caucus, the Green Schools Caucus, the House Afterschool Caucus, and the STEM (Science, Technology, Engineering, and Math) Caucus.

=== Energy and environment ===
Sutton participated in the House Renewable Energy and Energy Efficiency Caucus. She supported BASF in its development of lithium-ion batteries, including production at a facility in Elyria. She also supported the Cash for Clunkers legislation, which improved fuel efficiency from an average of 15.8 MPG to 24.9 MPG. Sutton acquired over 630 acres of undeveloped land to be added to the Cuyahoga Valley National Park.

=== Healthcare ===
One of Sutton's greatest aspirations in the field of Health Care was providing access to affordable quality care and putting an end to the discriminatory practices by insurance companies. In her past tenure Sutton voted for the Affordable Care Act, which passed and officially became a law on March 23, 2010. This Act provides those with insurance the reassurance that their claims cannot be delayed or possibly denied and those without insurance more access to affordable insurance. The Act also helps to curb cost of insurance to families, businesses, and the government and it calls for the preservation of Medicare. Sutton also worked to pass the State Children's Health Insurance Program (SCHIP) to provide insurance to families with children who cannot afford personal insurance. It is speculated that the SCHIP helps to insure about 11 million children who come from low-income families throughout the nation. Sutton worked on health care issues in the House School and Health Safety Caucus and the Congressional Task Force on Seniors.

== Personal life ==
Sutton is an attorney specializing in labor law. Between her time in the Ohio and United States legislatures, Sutton worked as a labor lawyer with the firm of Faulkner, Muskovitz & Phillips LLP (FMP).

She currently lives in Copley Township with her husband Doug Corwon, a mediator with the Federal Mediation and Conciliation Service.

== See also ==
- Women in the United States House of Representatives

U.S. House of Representatives
Preceded by Sherrod Brown	Member of the U.S. House of Representatives from Ohio's 13th congressional district 2007–2013	Succeeded by Tim Ryan
Party political offices
Preceded by Sharen Neuhardt	Democratic nominee for Lieutenant Governor of Ohio; 2018	Succeeded by Cheryl Stephens
U.S. order of precedence (ceremonial)
Preceded by Mark Green as Former U.S. Representative	Order of precedence of the United States as Former U.S. Representative	Succeeded by Charlie Melancon as Former U.S. Representative
