= Lanzinger =

Lanzinger is a surname. Notable people with the surname include:

- Günther Lanzinger (born 1972), Austrian ice hockey player
- Judith Ann Lanzinger (born 1946), American jurist
- Matthias Lanzinger (born 1980), Austrian alpine skier
- Claudio Lanzinger (born 1992), Spanish - Austrian former professional padel player.
