= Judith Ann Lanzinger =

American judge

Associate Justice of the Ohio Supreme Court
- In office January 1, 2005 – December 31, 2016
- Preceded by: Francis E. Sweeney
- Succeeded by: Patrick F. Fischer

Personal details
- Born: April 2, 1946 (age 80) Toledo, Ohio
- Party: Republican
- Spouse: Robert Lanzinger
- Children: two
- Education: University of Toledo; University of Nevada, Reno

Judith Lanzinger (born April 2, 1946 in Toledo, Ohio) is an American jurist. She retired as a justice of the Ohio Supreme Court. On the Ohio judiciary for 31 years, she was the only Ohio Supreme Court justice to have been elected to all four levels of Ohio's judiciary system. She was elected to the Supreme Court of Ohio in 2004, becoming the 150th justice in the court.

== Early life and education ==
Born Judith Ann Hodorowski, she grew up in northern Toledo. was the daughter of a carpenter, and the granddaughter of a coal miner. She is of Polish descent, and was baptized at St. Hedwig's Church. While young, she was a postulant at the Franciscan Sisters of Sylvania in Ohio. She graduated magna cum laude from the University of Toledo, with a dual major in education and English. Early in her career, she taught students of various ages, from kindergarten to college. She was valedictorian at the University of Toledo College of Law, where she became an adjust professor in 1988.

After graduating from the University of Toledo, she attended the National Judicial College at the University of Nevada, Reno, at which she was the second woman nationwide to be awarded a master's degree in judicial studies; she has taught classes in this field since 1990.

== Judicial career ==
Lanzinger's professional career included many different positions in the halls of justice: Toledo Municipal Court, the Lucas County Common Pleas Court, and the Sixth District Court of Appeals.

Lanzinger joined the Toledo Municipal Court bench in 1985. She became active with the National Judicial College in the 1980s. She was elected to the Toledo Municipal Court in 1985. From 1989 until 2003, she then served on the Lucas County Common Pleas Court. From 2003 until 2005 she was on the 6th District Court of Appeals. In 2009, she wrote a ruling that found "police need a warrant to search suspects' cellphones," which was later upheld in 2015 by the U.S. Supreme Court.

=== Ohio Supreme Court ===
In her term for Justice, she ran against Mary Jane Trap, presiding judge of the 11th District Ohio Court of Appeals. At the time, Lanzinger was 64. She was endorsed by publications such as The Plain Dealer in her run for Ohio Supreme Court. Wrote the Dealer, "On the Supreme Court, Lanzinger has steered an independent course. In one case of great interest to Cleveland and other cities, she dissented from a ruling that overturned local residency laws for public employees; the legislature, she wrote, had overstepped its boundaries and violated the "home rule" language of the Ohio Constitution."

Lanzinger, a Republican, was elected to the Supreme Court in 2004, taking office on New Year's Day 2005. Due to Ohio's mandatory retirement for judges who have reached the age of 70, she did not run for re-election in 2016. She was quoted saying she was "unhappy" at the mandatory retirement. Her elected replacement was Patrick F. Fischer.

In August 2016, the Associated Press reported that Lanzinger was teaching poetry to judges, teaching for the sixth time a course in Ashland, Oregon for the National Judicial College.

Her official portrait was unveiled as a justice in February 2017. In March 2017, she donated her personal papers to her alma mater, the University of Toledo.

== Personal life ==
She married Robert Lanzinger in 1967, and they have two children together. Her son, Joshua Lanzinger, is a Toledo Municipal Court judge.

Legal offices
Preceded by Francis E. Sweeney	Associate Justice of the Ohio Supreme Court; 2005–2016	Succeeded by Patrick F. Fischer
