= Robert A. Gardner (politician) =

American politician (born 1945)

Bob Gardner
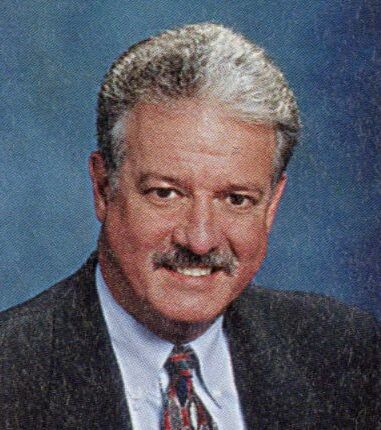

Member of the Ohio Senate from the 18th district
- In office January 3, 1997 – December 31, 2004
- Preceded by: Robert Boggs
- Succeeded by: Tim Grendell

Personal details
- Born: September 22, 1945 (age 80) Algeria

Robert A. Gardner (born September 22, 1945) is an Ohio politician and former Republican member of the Ohio Senate. He represented the 18th district, which encompassed all of Lake County as well as portions of Cuyahoga and Geauga Counties, from 1997 to 2004. He was succeeded by Tim Grendell. Along with his stint in the Ohio Senate, he also made an unsuccessful bid for the United States House of Representatives in 1992, losing to Eric Fingerhut.
