= Ohio Eleventh District Court of Appeals =

State court in Ohio, US

- Established: 1968
- Jurisdiction: Ohio
- Location: Warren, Ohio
- Composition method: Election
- Authorised by: Ohio Constitution of 1851 and Ohio Revised Code Chapter 2501
- Appeals to: Supreme Court of Ohio
- Judge term length: Six Years
- Number of positions: Five
- Website: http://www.11thcourt.co.trumbull.oh.us/index.html

The Ohio Eleventh District Court of Appeals is one of twelve appellate courts in Ohio. It is a state court. The Eleventh District is composed of five counties: Ashtabula, Geauga, Lake, Portage, and Trumbull.

When a lower court in one of those five counties has issued a final appealable order, the parties generally have the right to one appeal to the court of appeals. A further appeal may be attempted to the Ohio Supreme Court. Since the Ohio Supreme Court elects to review only a few cases per year, the Court of Appeals is generally the court of last resort in Ohio.

The Eleventh District Court of Appeals was composed of four judges until legislative approval in 1999 increased their number to five, each elected to six-year terms by the citizens of the five counties in the district. An appellate judge in Ohio must be a licensed attorney within Ohio and have six or more years of Ohio legal practice or have served as a judge in any jurisdiction for at least six years. The current judges of the court (as of June 2025) are Scott Lynch, Matt Lynch, John Eklund, Eugene Lucci, and Robert J. Patton.

Each case on appeal is decided by a panel of three judges. Cases are decided through a review of the record of the inferior court or tribunal, as informed by the briefs submitted by the parties and by oral argument (if requested by either party). New evidence is not permitted to be introduced on appeal.

In January 2000 the Eleventh District Court of Appeals unveiled a new courthouse in downtown Warren, Ohio. The Court address is: 111 High Street, N.E., Warren, Ohio 44481.

Judge (party)	Joined Court	Term ends
Matt Lynch (R)	2019	2027
Scott Lynch (R)	2025	2031
John J. Eklund (R)	2021	2025
Eugene Lucci (R)	2023	2029
Robert Patton (R)	2023	2027

== See also ==
- List of Ohio politicians by state office
- Ohio Supreme Court
- Ohio District Courts of Appeals
