= Tim Grendell =

American politician

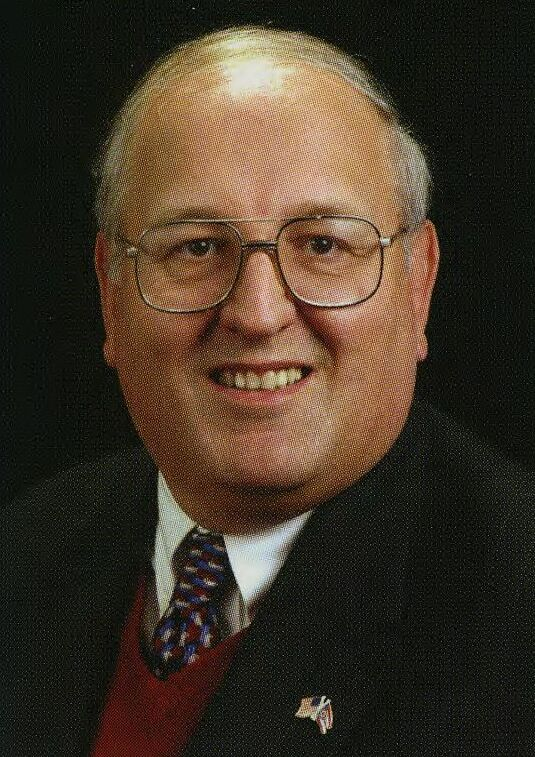

Geauga County Juvenile and Probate court judge
- Incumbent
- Assumed office September 20, 2011
- Appointed by: Governor John Kasich

Member of the Ohio Senate from the 18th district
- In office January 3, 2005 – September 20, 2011
- Preceded by: Bob Gardner
- Succeeded by: John Eklund

Member of the Ohio House of Representatives from the 98th district
- In office January 3, 2001 – January 3, 2005
- Preceded by: Diane Grendell
- Succeeded by: Matt Dolan

Personal details
- Born: April 17, 1953 (age 73) Cleveland, Ohio
- Party: Republican
- Spouse: Diane Grendell
- Children: 2
- Education: John Carroll University (BA); Case Western Reserve University (JD); University of Virginia (LLM)
- Profession: Attorney
- Appointed to: Executive Committee Board of the Ohio Judicial Conference
- Elected: President-elect of the Ohio Association of Probate Judges

Timothy J. Grendell (born April 17, 1953) is a Republican judge on the Geauga County Court of Common Pleas. He was a member of the Ohio Senate from 2005 to 2011, and of the Ohio House of Representatives from 2000 until 2004. Timothy Grendell was appointed to the Geauga County Court of Common Pleas as the Juvenile and Probate judge in 2011 by then Governor John Kasich after leaving Columbus, OH. After seeking election again, running unopposed in 2020, he is currently Geauga County's elected judge. In November 2025, Timothy Grendell received an 18-month suspension from the Ohio Supreme Court for violations of the Code of Judicial Conduct.

== Education and career ==
Grendell received his JD from Case Western Reserve University School of Law and his LLM from the University of Virginia Law School. He was awarded a bachelor's degree in history from John Carroll University and graduated from St. Ignatius High School. Grendell served in the United States Army from 1978 to 1983, and was assigned to the Judge Advocate General (JAG) Office for the 2nd Armored Division at Fort Hood, Texas.

In private practice, Grendell took a case where he represented people opposed to a rezoning issue, the Ohio Supreme Court ruled against Grendell's clients and sharply criticized his reliance on "gamesmanship," "dilatory actions" and "unjustified delaying tactics". Months later, the court ordered Grendell to pay thousands of dollars in sanctions in a case where he tried to force the Ohio General Assembly to appropriate funds for an airport project he supported. The court said Grendell's lawsuit was "frivolous" and that "harassment is the only apparent rationale" for his accusations of criminal activity by one of the defendants.

== Ohio state politics ==
With his wife, Diane Grendell, term limited from the House in 2000, he sought her position to replace her. He won a first term with 58.3% of the electorate. In 2002, Grendell won reelection with 69.7% of the vote against Democrat Meg Cacciacarro.

After serving two terms in the Ohio House of Representatives, Grendell ran for the Ohio Senate in 2004, and won with 59.6% of the vote over Democrat John Hawkins. He won reelection in 2008 unopposed. In the 128th General Assembly, Grendell was Chairman of the Ohio State Senate Judiciary and Criminal Justice Committee, Vice-chairman of the State and Local Government and Veterans Affairs Committee, and a member of the Agriculture Committee, Environment and Natural Resources Committee, Correctional Institution Inspection Committee, and Joint Committee on Agency Rule Review.

During his time as state senator, Grendell worked to oppose the Great Lakes Compact, water conservation standards intended to ensure a level economic playing field for water use throughout the eight Great Lakes states. With support from Republican and Democratically led states, the Compact garnered support from business and environmental interests alike. Grendell made the argument that the Compact interfered with private property rights.

Grendell waived the two years left in his Senate term to run for his former House of Representatives seat in order to avoid term limits. On November 2, 2010, he won back his former House seat, the 98th district, decisively. With the Senate then having to appoint someone to the remainder of Grendell's unexpired Senate term, it was rumored that Grendell's wife, Diane Grendell, was a possibility for appointment. Upon learning that she would not be appointed, Grendell decided to remain in the Senate. Soon after, The Plain Dealer and other state newspapers began questioning Grendell's motives and true agenda as a state legislator.

In the 129th General Assembly, Grendell was a member of the committees on Agriculture, Environment and Natural Resources; Government Oversight and Reform (as vice chairman); Judiciary-Criminal Justice (as chairman); and State and Local Government and Veteran's Affairs. He served on the Ohio Attorney General's Human Trafficking Commission.

In September 2011, Grendell resigned after Gov. John Kasich appointed him to serve as a judge on the Geauga County probate court. The chairwoman of the Geauga County Republican Party reported that Kasich appointed Grendell to the position "to get him out of Columbus," as the party considered him "a narcissist and mentally ill."

== Judicial career ==
In September 2011 Grendell was appointed judge of the Geauga County Juvenile and Probate Court by the governor. He was elected again to the position in November 2014. In 2012 he presided over the hearing to bind over alleged Chardon school shooter T. J. Lane for trial in adult court per Ohio law. He is the co-creator of the Good Deeds Program with former Geauga County Recorder Sharon Gingerich, an effort to educate and assist Geauga County with probate planning for real estate and vehicles. He was named President of the Ohio Juvenile Judges in 2017 and elected to the National Committee of Probate Judges.

In January 2015, Grendell attempted to hold Geauga County Republican Party Chairwoman Nancy McArthur in contempt for expressing negative opinions about him, including calling him "a chameleon who takes revenge on people who disagree with him" in a juvenile court case before the judge, but the Appellate Court intervened to stop his contempt of court proceedings.

In December 2019, Grendell told election officials that he planned to retire before his term ended so that if re-elected, he could receive both a salary of over $150,000 and a pension, both funded by taxpayers. This practice is commonly known as “double dipping.”

During the COVID-19 pandemic in Ohio, Grendell has been publicly vocal about his belief that the pandemic is overblown. In May 2020, he attended a protest close to his courthouse and called public health restrictions unconstitutional. In June 2020, during his testimony to an Ohio Senate committee, he blamed health authorities and the media for inducing panic in the population over the virus. In court Grendell has referred to the pandemic as a "panic-demic" and claimed that at least 15 mothers were using it as an excuse to "mess with" fathers' parenting time in custody cases before him. In October 2020, Grendell made an order forbidding two parents from getting their child tested for COVID-19 without his permission. When a doctor ordered a test after the child in question developed severe breathing problems and was hospitalized, Grendell threatened to hold the mother in contempt of court. The mother has not been reunited with her sons and has not had a hearing. The contempt is still pending and her sons have been removed for nearly 3 years. In December 2020, the Geauga Maple Leaf stated that multiple sources were reporting that Grendell and his wife had contracted COVID-19. There was a “shroud of secrecy” regarding his health and whereabouts but he had moved all appointments to be virtual.

On November 21, 2025 the Ohio Supreme Court suspended Grendell for 18 months unpaid for violation of the Code of Judicial Conduct related to a case where detailed two children who did not want to visit their father.

== Controversies ==
Grendell faced disciplinary charges before Ohio's Board of Professional Conduct in early 2024. The charges stemmed from his actions in several controversial custody cases, a prolonged dispute with the county auditor, and his legislative advocacy.

Grendell's controversial decisions in custody cases included incarcerating two boys for refusing to visit their father, amidst allegations of abuse, and threatening another child's mother with contempt of court for allowing a COVID-19 test without his consent. His involvement in a turf war with Geauga County Auditor Charles Walder over the payment of court bills led to a third charge, highlighting a misuse of judicial authority to override county expenditure protocols.

Additionally, Grendell faced charges for testifying in favor of legislation that his wife, then-state Rep. Diane Grendell, sponsored, raising concerns over the misuse of his judicial position for personal or familial gain. This advocacy, especially in support of the "Truth in COVID Statistics" bill, alongside his criticisms of COVID-19 safety measures, brought further scrutiny.

These actions, according to the Ohio Supreme Court Office of Disciplinary Counsel, not only abused the prestige of his office but also potentially jeopardized the well-being of children under his jurisdiction and conflicted with the administration of justice. The case against Grendell was set for hearing over multiple dates in February and March 2024, with the legal community and the public eyeing the outcomes for their broader implications on judicial conduct and accountability.

On October 4, 2024, a panel of the Ohio Board of Professional Conduct recommended that Grendell be suspended from the practice of law for 18 months, with 6 months stayed on conditions, and that he be immediately suspended from judicial office for the duration of his disciplinary suspension.
