= Diane Grendell =

American politician (born 1945)

Member of the Ohio House of Representatives from the 76th district
- In office May 29, 2019 – December 31, 2022
- Preceded by: Sarah LaTourette
- Succeeded by: Marilyn John

Member of the Ohio House of Representatives from the 68th district
- In office January 1, 1992 – December 31, 2000
- Preceded by: Bob Clark
- Succeeded by: Tim Grendell

Personal details
- Born: March 16, 1945 (age 81) Cleveland, Ohio
- Party: Republican
- Spouse: Tim Grendell
- Education: Cleveland State University (JD)

Diane Veronica Grendell (born March 16, 1945) is a former member of the Ohio House of Representatives, representing the 76th District from 2019 until 2023. A Republican, previously, Grendell served as a judge on the Ohio Eleventh District Court of Appeals. She was elected to this position in 2000, 2006, and 2012, and served until 2019. She previously served in the Ohio House of Representatives in a similar seat from 1993 to 2000. She is married to former state legislator and Geauga County Court of Common Pleas Probate and Juvenile Judge Tim Grendell.

In 2019, state Representative Sarah LaTourette resigned from her seat to take a position in the non-profit sector. Ohio House Republicans appointed Grendell to succeed her. She was supported by Larry Householder and a committee that he handpicked, against the recommendation of the Geauga County GOP Executive Committee which had selected South Russell Village Councilman Dennis Galicki. She was sworn in on May 29, 2019. On the same day, Grendell voted for House Bill 6, for which Householder was ultimately arrested by the FBI as part of an alleged $61M bribery and racketeering scheme.

A possible connection to Householder allowed Grendell to raise over $500,000 in her campaign against Frank Hall, who raised only $11,000. She defeated Hall in the primary by 2,734 votes.

Grendell’s campaign received $395,000 from the House Republican Campaign Committee, a group alleged by the FBI to be controlled by Householder to funnel money from First Energy to his allies.

Grendell won re-election in November 2020, defeating Democrat Garrett Westhoven.

For the 2022 election, Grendell decided not to run for re-election in what would become Ohio's 99th State House district, instead opting to run for Geauga County Auditor. She lost in the Republican primary to incumbent auditor Charles Walder by 33 points.

== COVID-19 Pandemic Response ==
Grendell has been a vocal critic of public health measures intended to limit the spread of COVID-19. In September 2020, she proposed a bill to cancel the state of emergency and all public health restrictions. She stated that “the flu is far higher, and we don’t wear masks for that.”
