= Great Lakes St. Lawrence Seaway Development Corporation =

U.S. agency operating the St. Lawrence Seaway

Agency overview
- Formed: 1954; 72 years ago
- Jurisdiction: United States government
- Headquarters: 1200 New Jersey Avenue, SE W62-300, Washington, D.C.
- Agency executives: J. M. McCoshen, Administrator; Anthony Fisher, Deputy Administrator
- Parent department: United States Department of Transportation
- Website: https://www.seaway.dot.gov/

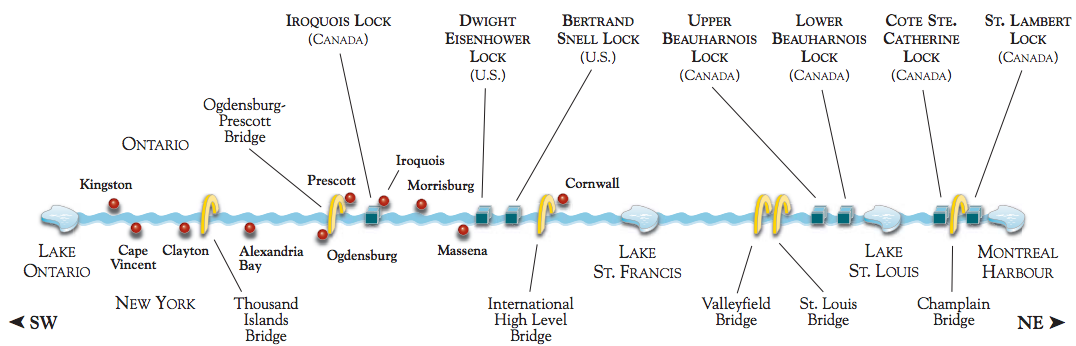
St. Lawrence Seaway locks showing country ownership

The Great Lakes St. Lawrence Seaway Development Corporation (GLS) is an agency of the United States Department of Transportation that operates and maintains the U.S.-owned and operated facilities of the joint United States-Canadian St. Lawrence Seaway. It operates 2 of the 15 locks of the Seaway between Montreal and Lake Erie. The corporation also works to develop trade across the larger seaway system, which includes the Great Lakes as well as the St. Lawrence Seaway.

The corporation was formerly named the St. Lawrence Seaway Development Corporation (SLSDC), but was renamed in the 2021 Consolidated Appropriations Act to recognize the corporation's trade development work in the connected Great Lakes region.

Its Canadian counterpart is the St. Lawrence Seaway Management Corporation, a non-profit corporation under Canadian law.

== Advisory board ==
The administrator is advised by the Advisory Board of the Great Lakes St. Lawrence Seaway Development Corporation. The board is composed of five members appointed by the President, by and with the advice and consent of the Senate. No more than three of these may belong to the same political party. The advisory board meets at the call of the administrator, at least once each ninety days. The board reviews the general policies of the Corporation, including its policies in connection with design and construction of facilities and the establishment of rules of measurement for vessels and cargo and rates of charges or tolls.

=== Board members ===
The current advisory board of the Great Lakes St. Lawrence Seaway Development Corporation as of January 25, 2023:

Position	Name	Party	Confirmed
Chair	David J. McMillan	Democratic	March 29, 2012
Member	William Mielke	Republican	January 1, 2013
Member	Arthur Sulzer	Republican	January 1, 2013
Member	Vacant		
Member	Vacant		

== List of administrators ==
No.	Administrator	Term started	Term ended	Notes
1	Lewis G. Castle	1954	June 5, 1960	Died in office
—	Martin W. Oettershagen (acting)	June 5, 1960	1961	
2	Martin W. Oettershagen	1961	December 1961	
3	Joseph H. McCann	1962	1969	
4	David W. Oberlin	June 1969	February 1983	
5	James L. Emery	February 1984	February 1991	
6	Stanford Parris	March 1991	1995	Resigned
7	Gail McDonald	January 1996	March 1998	
8	Albert S. Jacquez	January 1999	December 2005	
9	Collister Johnson, Jr.	October 7, 2006	May 2012	
—	Craig Middlebrook (acting)	May 2012	August 13, 2013	
10	Betty Sutton	August 13, 2013	January 20, 2017	
—	Craig Middlebrook (acting)	January 20, 2017	November 6, 2022	
11	Adam Tindall-Schlicht	November 6, 2022	January 20, 2025	
—	Anthony Fisher (Acting)	January 20, 2025	June 16, 2025	
12	J. M McCoshen	June 16, 2025	Present	

== See also ==
- Title 33 of the Code of Federal Regulations
- List of navigation authorities in the United States
