= Gail McDonald =

American political administrator

Administrator of the Saint Lawrence Seaway Development Corporation
- In office January 1996 – March 1998
- President: Bill Clinton
- Preceded by: Stanford Parris
- Succeeded by: Albert S. Jacquez

Personal details
- Born: March 9, 1944
- Died: January 18, 2020 (aged 75)
- Education: Texas Christian University

Gail Clements McDonald (March 9, 1944 - January 18, 2020) was an American political administrator who was appointed as Chair of Interstate Commerce Commission from 1993 until the commission's disbandment by Congress in 1995. She was appointed to other positions in government. In 2004 she moved to North Carolina, and has served in political administrative positions there.

== Life and career ==
She grew up in Greenville, Mississippi and studied history at Texas Christian University, where she earned bachelor's and master's degrees. She took a teaching position at Oklahoma State University. In 1974, she became a local campaign manager and later a staffer for Governor David Boren, who was elected as a US senator. In 1979, McDonald moved to Washington, D.C., with her husband, who joined the Federal Election Commission. She was hired as associate director of the Gas Research Institute, now the Gas Technology Institute.

In 1990, McDonald was named to the Interstate Commerce Commission. She became its chair in 1993. The commission was disbanded by a vote of Congress on June 16, 1994. Some programs were shifted to the U.S. Department of Transportation, and the commission was closed in 1995. McDonald was appointed as an administrator in the Department of Transportation, then as the national ombudsman for the Small Business Administration. After leaving that position, she was appointed to Maryland's Public Service Commission.

McDonald and her husband moved to North Carolina in 2004, where she took a position with the state Ports Authority. In 2006, she was named as the first small-business ombudsman for the North Carolina Department of Commerce.
