= Matt Lynch =

American politician

Judge of the Ohio Court of Appeals for the 11th district
- Incumbent
- Assumed office February 8, 2021
- Preceded by: Timothy Cannon

Judge of the Ohio Court of Appeals for the 11th district
- In office February 9, 2019 – February 8, 2021
- Preceded by: Colleen Mary O'Toole
- Succeeded by: John Eklund

Member of the Ohio House of Representatives from the 76th district
- In office April 2012 – January 1, 2015
- Succeeded by: Sarah LaTourette

Personal details
- Born: June 11, 1951 (age 75) Washington, D.C., U.S.
- Party: Republican
- Education: John Carroll University; Cleveland State University (JD)
- Profession: Lawyer

Matt Lynch (born June 11, 1951) is an American attorney, politician, and jurist serving as a Judge of the Ohio Court of Appeals for the Eleventh District which includes Ashtabula, Geauga, Lake, Portage and Trumbull Counties. Lynch previously served three years as a member of the Ohio House of Representatives.

Born in Washington, D.C., Lynch attended John Carroll University and received his Juris Doctor degree from Cleveland State University. He practiced law for 35 years with his father, John Kennedy Lynch, and was elected Trustee of Bainbridge Township in 2007. In 2011 Lynch ran for Chardon Municipal Judge, but lost to Democrat Terri Stupica. He considered running for the Ohio House of Representatives in 2010, but withdrew from the race when his wife Laura was diagnosed with breast cancer.

In November 2012, Lynch was elected as state representative for Geauga and Portage Counties. serving from 2012 through 2014. Lynch attributed his victory to support from the Tea Party movement, and supported cutting taxes and reducing the size of government.

In 2014, Lynch launched a primary election challenge against Congressman Dave Joyce. Joyce won the primary with 55% of the vote, and went on to win the November general election. In June 2015, Lynch launched his 2016 campaign for Congress, once again eventually losing the Republican primary to David Joyce.

Lynch ran for Appellate Judge in the Republican primary in 2018, defeating the incumbent. He then won the general election in November, easily winning in all five counties of the 11th District. In 2020 Lynch ran to extend his term as Judge and again won overwhelmingly in all five counties of the Eleventh District Court of Appeals. Lynch will serve as Judge through February 2027.
