= Sarah LaTourette =

American politician (born 1983)

Former member of the Ohio House of Representatives from the 76th district
- In office January 3, 2015 – May 5, 2019
- Preceded by: Matt Lynch
- Succeeded by: Diane Grendell

Personal details
- Born: May 25, 1983 (age 43)
- Party: Republican
- Spouse: Scott Kayser (m. 2010; div. 2022)
- Children: 1
- Education: Miami University

Sarah LaTourette (born May 25, 1983) is an American politician who served as a member of the Ohio House of Representatives from the 76th district and is now serving as the Chief Advocacy Officer of Ohio Children's Alliance. Sarah has also served as executive director of Ohio Family and Children First, a partnership of government agencies and community organizations that works to coordinate services for children in need.

== Career ==
The daughter of former Congressman Steve LaTourette, she worked in both the private and public sectors before seeking public office. She initially sought to challenge incumbent Republican Matt Lynch in a primary election, but he opted out of a re-election bid to run for the United States Congress. LaTourette was uncontested in the primary, and won the general election with 68% of the vote. Her district included most of Geauga County and the northern part of Portage County. She resigned on May 5, 2019, to accept the job as executive director of the nonprofit Ohio Family and Children First.

=== House Bill 214 ===
In 2017, she was a primary sponsor of House Bill 214, which prohibited physicians from performing an abortion when they knew the procedure was sought because of a Down syndrome diagnosis. The bill was enacted in 2018.

== Electoral History ==
2014 General Election

After running unopposed in the 2014 primary election, LaTourette advanced to and won the 2014 General Election for the District 76 Representative of the Ohio House of Representatives, defeating her Democratic opponent, Joseph Lanese, by more than double the amount of votes. LaTourette amassed almost 68% of the vote share, over 23,000 votes.

2016 General Election

Once again running unopposed in the Republican Primary for the District 76 Representative of the Ohio House election, LaTourette won the 2016 General Election by winning over 68% of the vote share, defeating Democrat Terri McIntee, totaling just under 40,000 votes.

2018 General Election

Following an uncontested Republican Primary, LaTourette advanced to the general election facing Democratic challenger, John Kennedy. LaTourette won greater than 62% of the vote share and obtained just under 32,000 votes. LaTourette eventually resigned in 2019 to accept the Executive Director position of Ohio Family and Children First
