= Adam Schlicht =

American port director

Adam Tindall-Schlicht
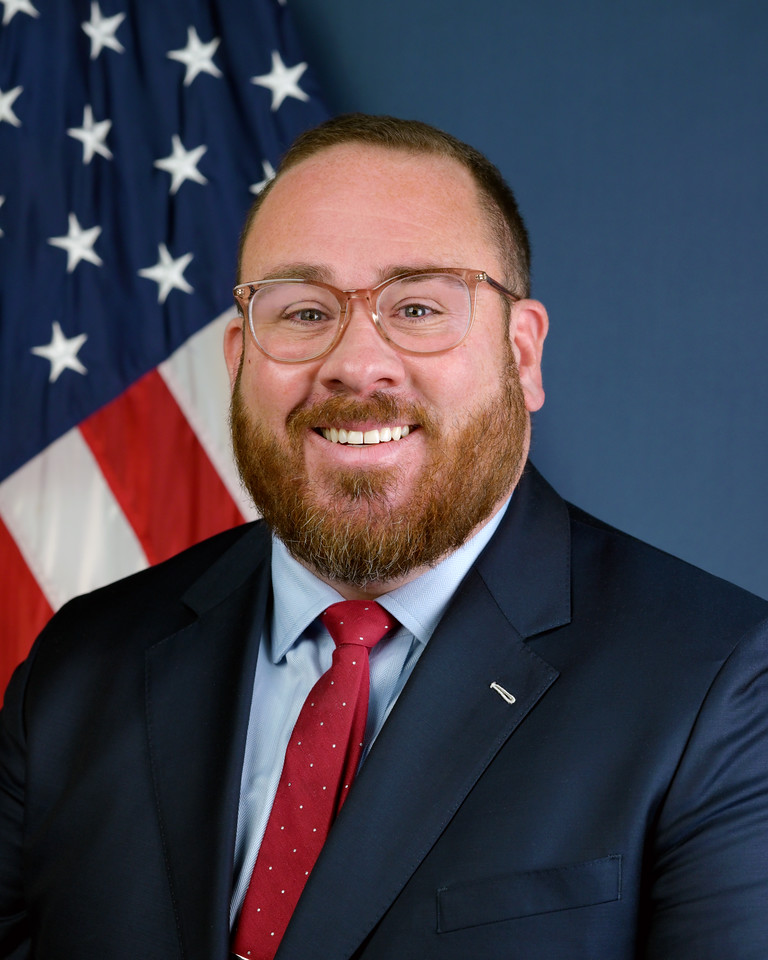
- Citizenship: United States
- Education: Bachelor of Science in political science, University of Wisconsin–Madison; Master of Public Administration American University
- Occupation: Administrator
- Employer: U.S. Department of Transportation
- Organization: Great Lakes St. Lawrence Seaway Development Corporation
- Title: Administrator
- Spouse: Aaron Tindall-Schlicht

Adam Tindall-Schlicht is an American government official, who had served as the eleventh Administrator of the Great Lakes St. Lawrence Seaway Development Corporation (GLS). President Joe Biden appointed Tindall-Schlicht to the role of GLS Administrator on November 6, 2022.

Prior to his presidential appointment, he was appointed in August 2018 as director of the Port of Milwaukee, replacing former director Paul Vornholt and served in that role until October 2022.
