= Phyllis Cleveland =

American politician

Phyllis Cleveland was a Cleveland City Council member representing Ward 5.

== Early life and education ==
Cleveland graduated from East Technical High School and Case Western Reserve University with degrees in English and law. She was an assistant prosecutor, staff attorney, and a magistrate.

She worked for the Cleveland Tenants Organization.

== Political career ==
Cleveland was elected in 2006 in Ward 5. Cleveland was named majority leader in 2009.

Citing health issues, she resigned May 3, 2021.

After resignation, Cleveland joined the Department of Public Utilities.
