= National Judicial College =

Institution providing judicial training to judges in the United States

The National Judicial College (NJC) was established in 1963 as an entity within the American Bar Association. The NJC moved to the campus of the University of Nevada, Reno in 1964 and became a Nevada not-for-profit (501)(c)(3) educational corporation in 1977. The NJC provides judicial training to judges from across the United States.

== History ==
The American Bar Association joined with the American Judicature Society and the Institute of Judicial Administration to organize the Joint Committee for the Effective Administration of Justice in 1961. Supreme Court Justice Tom C. Clark served as chair of the committee. In 1961, Justice Clark held hearings across the U.S. to discuss improvements that could be made in the delivery of legal services and conduct of judicial matters. In 1963, Justice Clark and his Committee presented a final report, which included several recommendations including one stating the need to create an entity to provide judicial education.

The National Judicial College (originally operating under the name National College of State Trial Judges) opened its doors to judges in 1963 using money donated by the W. K. Kellogg Foundation. The NJC was located on the campus of the University of Colorado Boulder. The State of Nevada provided funding to relocate the NJC to the campus of the University of Nevada, Reno in 1964. The NJC's first building on the Reno campus was erected in 1972 with money from the Max C. Fleischmann Foundation. The NJC became a Nevada not-for-profit (501)(c)(3) educational corporation on January 1, 1977.

== Donald W. Reynolds National Center for the Courts & Media ==
The NJC partnered with the Donald W. Reynolds School of Journalism at the University of Nevada, Reno on the Center for Courts and Media. The Center for Courts and Media's intent is to provide the physical location and the appropriate atmosphere for debates and discussions among journalists and judges on the relationship between the two.

== Leadership and governance ==
The NJC has a 21-member Board of Trustees that sets policy and provides leadership in achieving the NJC's mission. The NJC's 16-member Board of Visitors is charged with furthering the quality of education offered by the NJC. The NJC's 10-member Faculty Council helps ensure that quality teaching standards are maintained and that the curricula offered are relevant to the college's participants. The NJC's president is Benes Z. Aldana.

== Sources ==
- PBS - A Conversation - National Judicial College
