= Patrick F. Fischer =

American judge (born 1957)

Pat Fischer

Justice of the Ohio Supreme Court
- Incumbent
- Assumed office January 1, 2017
- Preceded by: Judith Ann Lanzinger

Personal details
- Born: December 30, 1957 (age 68) Covington, Kentucky, U.S.
- Party: Republican
- Education: Harvard University (BA, JD)

Patrick F. Fischer (born December 30, 1957) is a justice of the Ohio Supreme Court. He was first elected in 2016 and re-elected in 2022.

== Early life and education ==
Fischer was born in 1957. He is a 1976 graduate of St. Xavier High School and received his undergraduate and law degrees from Harvard University.

== Career ==
Fischer's legal career began as a clerk for Judge William Bertelsman. Afterwards he joined the law firm of Keating Muething & Klekamp, where he became a partner after four years and continued to work until becoming a judge.

Fischer served as the president of the Cincinnati Bar Association for 2006 and 2007, and also made an unsuccessful bid for Cincinnati City Council in 2007. In 2010 he joined the Ohio First District Court of Appeals and was reelected in 2012. He then served as president of the Ohio State Bar Association for the 2012–2013 term.

Fischer was appointed by Chief Justice Thomas Moyer of the Supreme Court of Ohio to serve as co-chair of a task force seeking to improve Ohio's judicial system. He was also on the Ohio Supreme Court's Commission on Professionalism. He has also served on the Ohio Constitutional Modernization Commission as vice-chair of the commission's committee on the judicial branch.

=== Ohio Supreme Court ===
Fischer sought nomination as a Republican candidate for the Ohio Supreme Court. He won election in November 2016, and was re-elected in November 2022. His current term runs from January 1, 2023, to December 31, 2028. In April 2018, he voted in favor of rejecting a challenge to the state's death penalty law, upholding that judges, not just juries, can impose death sentences. In October 2018, he spoke at the Ohio Supreme Court's Student to Lawyer Symposium in Columbus.

== Personal life ==
Fischer and his wife, Jane, live with their dog in Cincinnati. His daughter is also an attorney in Ohio. Fischer is a member of St. Francis Xavier Church in Cincinnati, where he is a lector. He is also a Eucharistic minister.

Legal offices
Preceded by Judith Ann Lanzinger	Justice of the Ohio Supreme Court; 2017–present	Incumbent
