= John Eklund (Ohio politician) =

American politician

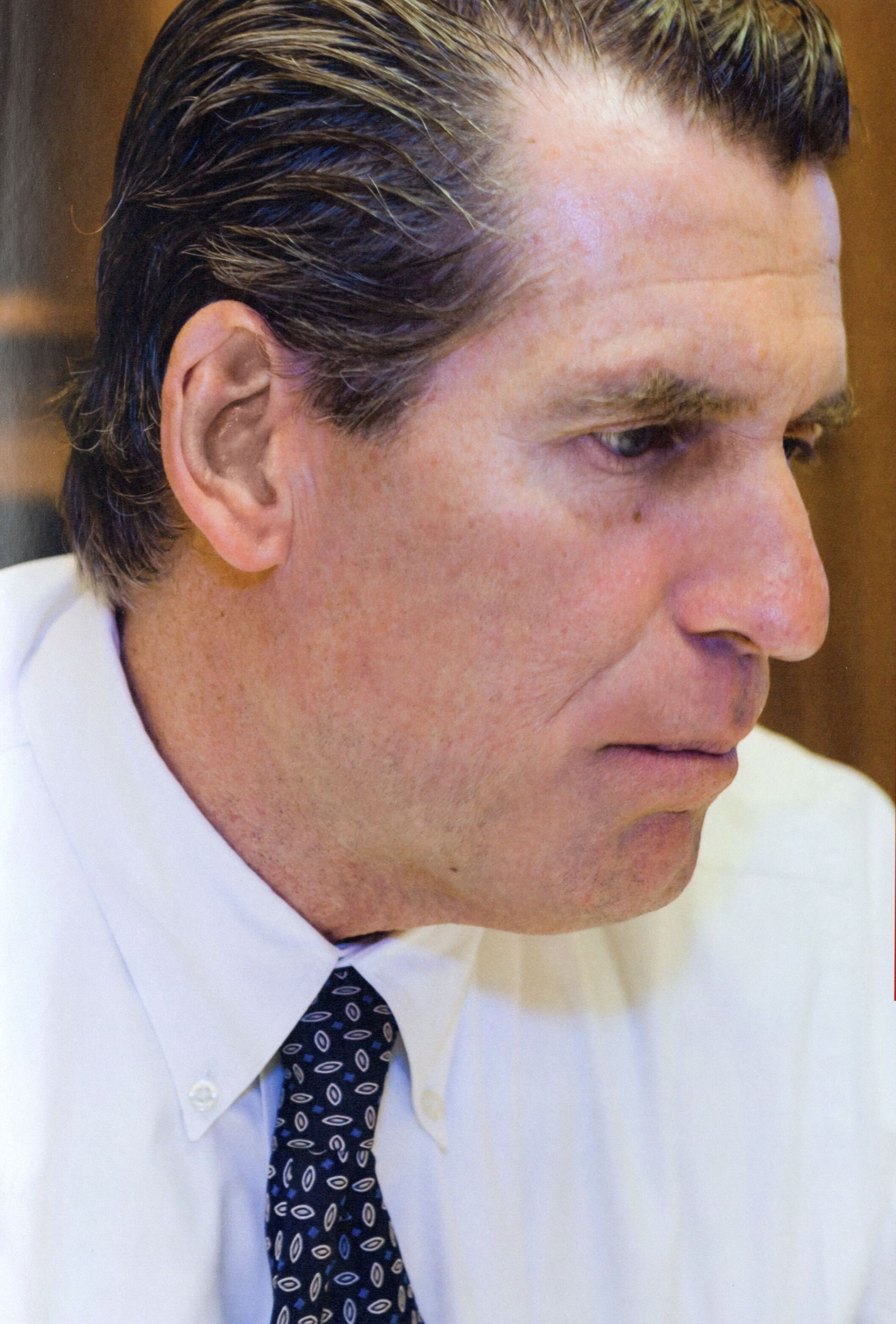

Judge of the Ohio Court of Appeals for the 11th district
- Incumbent
- Assumed office July 1, 2021
- Appointed by: Mike DeWine
- Preceded by: Matt Lynch

Member of the Ohio Senate from the 18th district
- In office November 9, 2011 – December 31, 2020
- Preceded by: Tim Grendell
- Succeeded by: Jerry Cirino

Personal details
- Party: Republican
- Spouse: Meg
- Education: Washington and Lee University School of Law, Union College
- Profession: Lawyer

John J. Eklund is a former Republican member of the Ohio Senate for the 18th district. He was appointed in November 2011 to replace Tim Grendell, who was appointed as a judge in Geauga County. The selection committee considered thirteen candidates for the appointment. He is the Chairman of the Senate Criminal Justice Committee. Eklund then went on to win the 2012 election for a full-term, winning with 54.7% of the vote. His district includes all of Portage County along with half of Lake County and most of Geauga County.

== FirstEnergy scandal ==
Sen. John Eklund co-sponsored House Bill 6 (HB 6), later at the center of the FirstEnergy bribery scandal. See Ohio nuclear bribery scandal.

According to campaign finance records, Eklund received $3,500 from the FirstEnergy political action committee in 2019.

Eklund was not charged in the federal bribery case. However, his support for HB 6 and campaign contributions from FirstEnergy drew scrutiny from watchdog organizations and media outlets, which pointed to the utility’s extensive financial influence in Ohio politics.

A 501(c)(4) organization called Generation Now was later identified in federal filings as the primary dark-money vehicle used to funnel tens of millions of dollars in support of HB 6 and related political activity. No public campaign finance records show direct contributions from Generation Now to Eklund’s committee, but its role in advancing HB 6 has been widely documented.

== Political career ==
=== Abortion ===
In 2019, Eklund voted in favor of Ohio Senate Bill 23, commonly referred to as the “Heartbeat Bill,” which prohibits abortions once a fetal heartbeat is detectable, typically around six weeks of pregnancy. Medical experts note that many pregnancies are not yet known at that stage and that cardiac activity at six weeks does not indicate a viable heart. The law was signed by Governor Mike DeWine on April 11, 2019, but was subsequently blocked by a federal judge and did not take effect at that time.

=== Criminal justice ===
As chair of the Senate Judiciary Committee, Eklund oversaw numerous bills relating to sentencing and criminal law. He supported recommendations from the Ohio Criminal Sentencing Commission’s Recodification Committee aimed at simplifying the state’s criminal code. Reform advocates argued the proposals did not go far enough, while prosecutors and victims’ rights groups criticized certain provisions as overly lenient.

=== Capital punishment ===
Eklund played a role in legislative debates on Ohio’s death penalty. He supported maintaining the death penalty framework while examining procedural reforms to ensure reliable evidence standards. His positions drew criticism from abolition advocates who sought repeal of capital punishment in Ohio.

=== Gun legislation ===
Eklund generally aligned with his party in supporting legislation expanding gun rights. He backed bills that broadened concealed carry rights and eased firearm regulations.

=== Energy policy ===
Beyond the FirstEnergy scandal, Eklund supported legislation favorable to coal and natural gas industries and was skeptical of mandates for renewable energy.

== Law career ==
Eklund joined law firm Calfee, Halter & Griswold in 1980, and became a partner in 1988. He specialises in antitrust law. Eklund has a law degree from Washington and Lee University School of Law and a bachelor's degree from Union College. He is married with two children.
