= Ohio District Courts of Appeals =

Intermediate appellate courts of Ohio

The Ohio District Courts of Appeals are the intermediate appellate courts of the U.S. state of Ohio. The Ohio Constitution provides for courts of appeals that have jurisdiction to review final appealable orders. There are twelve appellate districts, each consisting of at least one county, and the number of judges in each district varies from four to twelve. Each case is heard by a three-judge panel. There are currently 69 courts of appeals judges as provided by statute. A court of appeals judge is an elected position, with a term of six years. The Ohio Supreme Court has the discretion to review cases from the courts of appeals, but generally the appeals process in Ohio ends with the decision of the court of appeals.

== Judicial districts ==
District	Number of judges	Counties in district (major urban centers, seat in bold)	Number of counties
First district	6	Hamilton (**Cincinnati**)	1
Second district	5	Champaign, Clark (Springfield), Darke, Greene, Miami, and Montgomery (**Dayton**)	6
Third district	4	Allen (**Lima**), Auglaize, Crawford, Defiance, Hancock, Hardin, Henry, Logan, Marion, Mercer, Paulding, Putnam, Seneca, Shelby, Union, Van Wert, and Wyandot	17
Fourth district	4	Adams, Athens, Gallia, Highland, Hocking, Jackson, Lawrence, Meigs, Pickaway, Pike, Ross (**Chillicothe**), Scioto, Vinton, and Washington	14
Fifth district	6	Ashland, Coshocton, Delaware, Fairfield, Guernsey, Holmes, Knox, Licking, Morgan, Morrow, Muskingum, Perry, Richland (Mansfield), Stark (**Canton**), and Tuscarawas	15
Sixth district	5	Erie, Fulton, Huron, Lucas (**Toledo**), Ottawa, Sandusky, Williams, and Wood	8
Seventh district	4	Belmont, Carroll, Columbiana, Harrison, Jefferson, Mahoning (**Youngstown**), Monroe, and Noble	8
Eighth district	12	Cuyahoga (**Cleveland**)	1
Ninth district	5	Lorain (Lorain), Medina, Summit (**Akron**), and Wayne	4
Tenth district	8	Franklin (**Columbus**)	1
Eleventh district	5	Ashtabula, Geauga, Lake, Portage, and Trumbull (**Warren**)	5
Twelfth district	5	Brown, Butler (**Middletown**), Clermont, Clinton, Fayette, Madison, Preble, and Warren	8
TOTALS	69 judges		88 counties

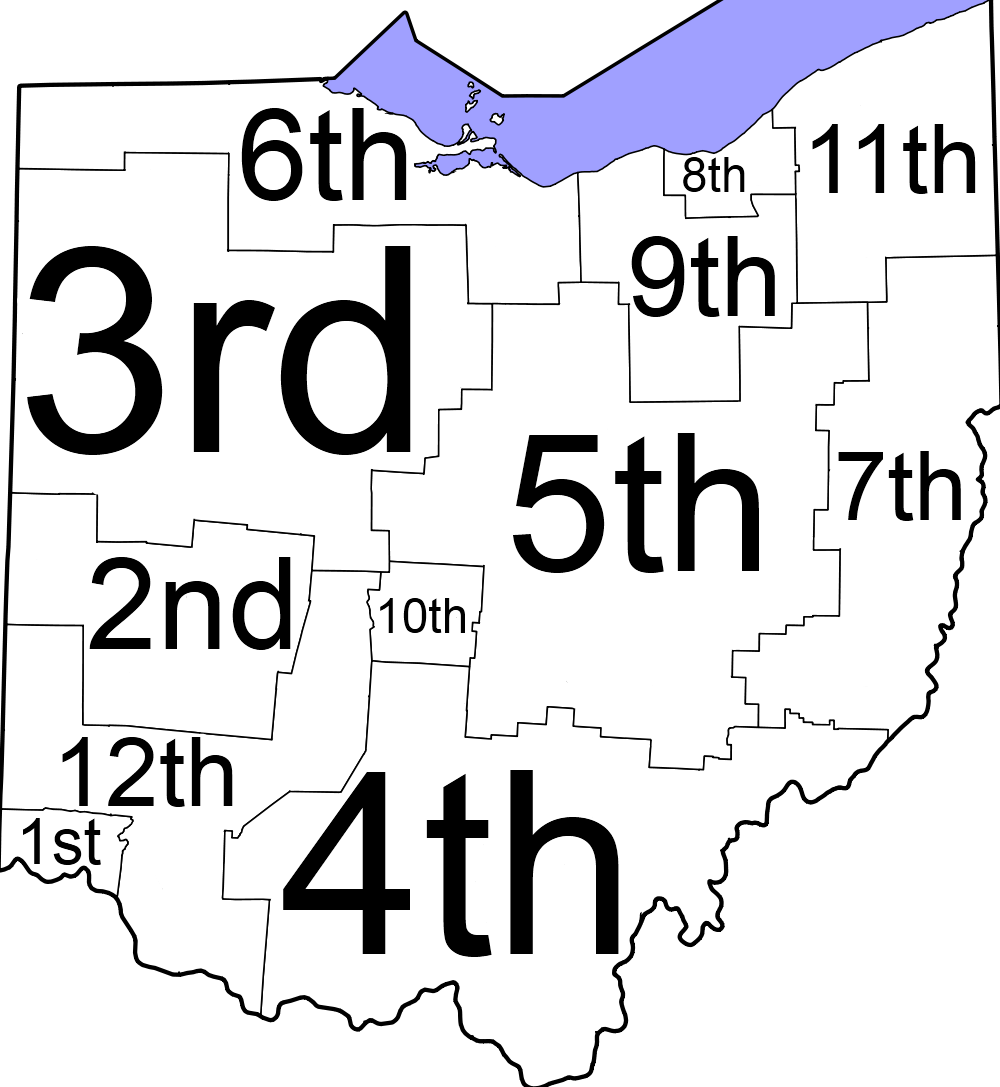
Judicial districts map

Court locations

== Judges ==
=== First District Court of Appeals ===
Name	Start	Term ends
Marilyn Zayas (D)	November 6, 2016	February 9, 2031
Candace Crouse (D)	February 11, 2019	February 10, 2031
Ginger Bock (D)	February 9, 2021	February 8, 2027
Jennifer Kinsley (D)	February 9, 2023	February 8, 2029
Terry Nestor (D)	February 9, 2025	February 8, 2031
Rich Moore (D)	February 12, 2025	February 11, 2031

=== Second District Court of Appeals ===
Name	Start	Term ends
Michael Tucker (R)	February 11, 2017	February 10, 2029
Chris Epley (R)	February 9, 2021	February 8, 2027
Mary Kate Huffman (R)	February 9, 2023	February 8, 2029
Ronald Lewis (R)	February 10, 2023	February 9, 2029
Robert Hanseman (R)	February 9, 2025	February 8, 2031

=== Third District Court of Appeals ===
Name	Start	Term ends
John Willamowski (R)	February 9, 2011	February 8, 2031
William Zimmerman (R)	February 9, 2017	February 8, 2029
Mark Miller (R)	February 9, 2021	February 8, 2027
Juergen Waldick (R)	February 11, 2023	February 10, 2029

=== Fourth District Court of Appeals ===
Name	Start	Term ends
Peter Abele (R)	February 9, 1991	February 8, 2027
Mike Hess (R)	February 10, 2011	February 9, 2031
Jason Smith (R)	February 9, 2019	February 8, 2031
Kristy Wilkin (R)	August 3, 2020	February 8, 2029

=== Fifth District Court of Appeals ===
Name	Start	Term ends
William Hoffman (R)	February 1, 1991	February 8, 2027
Craig Baldwin (R)	April 27, 2013	February 9, 2029
Andrew King (R)	February 9, 2023	February 8, 2029
Robert Montgomery (R)	February 9, 2025	February 8, 2031
Kevin Popham (R)	February 10, 2025	February 9, 2031
David Gormley (R)	February 11, 2025	February 10, 2031

=== Sixth District Court of Appeals ===
Name	Start	Term ends
Thomas Osowik (D)	February 9, 2007	February 8, 2027
Gene Zmuda (R)	February 9, 2013	February 8, 2031
Christine Mayle (R)	February 9, 2017	February 8, 2029
Myron Duhart (D)	February 10, 2021	February 9, 2027
Charles Sulek (R)	February 10, 2023	February 9, 2029

=== Seventh District Court of Appeals ===
Name	Start	Term ends
Cheryl Waite (D)	February 10, 1996	February 9, 2027
Carol Ann Robb (R)	February 9, 2015	February 8, 2027
Mark Hanni (R)	February 9, 2023	February 8, 2029
Katelyn Dickey (R)	February 9, 2025	February 8, 2031

=== Eighth District Court of Appeals ===
Name	Start	Term ends
Emanuella Groves (D)	February 11, 2021	February 10, 2027
Sean Gallagher (D)	February 9, 2003	February 8, 2027
Mary Kilbane (D)	February 9, 2005	December 31, 2028
Mary Boyle (D)	2006	February 8, 2031
Michael John Ryan (D)	2023	February 9, 2027
Kathleen Ann Keough (D)	February 9, 2011	January 2, 2029
Eileen A. Gallagher (D)	February 9, 2011	February 8, 2029
Frank Celebrezze (D)	2012	December 31, 2024
Eileen T. Gallagher (D)	February 9, 2013	January 2, 2031
Anita Laster Mays (D)	February 12, 2015	February 11, 2027
Lisa Forbes (D)	January 2021	January 1, 2029
Michelle Sheehan (D)	January 2, 2019	January 1, 2031

=== Ninth District Court of Appeals ===
Name	Start	Term ends
Nathan Manning (R)	August 3, 2026	February 9, 2029
Jennifer Lee Hensal (R)	2012	February 8, 2031
Betty Sutton (D)	February 9, 2021	February 8, 2027
Scot Stevenson (R)	February 9, 2023	February 8, 2029
Jill Flagg Lanzinger (R)	February 11, 2023	February 10, 2029

=== Tenth District Court of Appeals ===
Name	Start	Term ends
Carly Edelstein (D)	January 3, 2023	January 2, 2029
David Leland (D)	February 9, 2023	February 8, 2029
Terri Jamison (D)	July 1, 2021	June 30, 2027
Julia Dorrian (D)	January 2, 2011	January 1, 2029
Shawn Dingus (D)	February 10, 2025	February 9, 2031
Kristin Boggs (D)	January 1, 2023	December 31, 2028
Laurel Beatty Blunt (D)	February 9, 2019	February 8, 2031
Michael Mentel (D)	February 9, 2021	February 8, 2027

=== Eleventh District Court of Appeals ===
Name	Start	Term ends
Matt Lynch (R)	February 9, 2019	February 8, 2027
John Eklund (R)	July 1, 2021	February 8, 2031
Eugene Lucci (R)	February 9, 2023	February 8, 2029
Robert Patton (R)	June 5, 2023	February 9, 2027
Scott Lynch (R)	February 10, 2025	February 9, 2031

=== Twelfth District Court of Appeals ===
Name	Start	Term ends
Robert Hendrickson (R)	February 9, 2009	February 8, 2027
Robin Piper (R)	February 9, 2011	February 8, 2029
Michael Powell (R)	October 4, 2012	February 9, 2029
Matthew R. Byrne (R)	January 1, 2021	December 31, 2026
Melena Siebert (R)	February 9, 2025	February 8, 2031

== See also ==
- List of Ohio politicians by state office
