= Issue 1 =

Issue 1 may refer to:

== Ballot measures ==
=== Arkansas ===
- 2012 Arkansas Issue 1, a successful ballot measure to raise sales tax to pay for highway improvements

=== Ohio ===
- 2004 Ohio Issue 1, a successful ballot measure banning same-sex marriage in the state
- May 2018 Ohio Issue 1, a successful ballot measure regarding congressional redistricting
- November 2018 Ohio Issue 1, a failed ballot measure regarding the criminalization of drug possession and usage
- 2022 Ohio Issue 1, a successful ballot measure regarding cash bail procedures
- August 2023 Ohio Issue 1, a failed ballot measure regarding the process for proposing and approving amendments to the Ohio state constitution
- November 2023 Ohio Issue 1, a successful ballot measure codifying abortion rights in the state constitution.
- 2024 Ohio Issue 1, a redistricting commission initiative

== Organizations ==
- Issue One, an American non-profit organization that seeks to reduce the role of money in politics

== See also ==
- First issue
- Proposition 1
