= Proposition 1 =

Proposition 1 or Prop 1 may refer to:

== US state propositions ==
- California Proposition 1
- Idaho Proposition 1
- New York Proposition 1
- Texas Proposition 1

== US local propositions ==
- 2015 Houston, Texas Proposition 1
