= Ohio Redistricting Commission =

The Ohio Redistricting Commission is a seven-member partisan commission of officeholders dedicated to redrawing both Ohio's congressional and state legislative districts. It was established in 2011 following the passage of Issue 1 in 2015, and replaced the Ohio Apportionment Board, which drew the state's legislative districts from 1851 to 2011. It gained control over drawing the state's congressional districts following the passage of Issue 1 in May 2018.

The Commission consists of the governor, lieutenant governor, auditor and two members each appointed by legislative leaders in both chambers.

== History ==
=== Ohio Apportionment Board (1851-2011) ===
The Ohio Apportionment Board was an administrative body that drew single-member legislative districts for the Ohio General Assembly every ten years from 1851 to 2011. Each of the 33 senate districts is composed of three contiguous House of Representatives district.

The Ohio Apportionment Board had five members:

- the Governor of Ohio,
- the Ohio Secretary of State,
- the Ohio State Auditor,
- a member selected by the Speaker of the Ohio House of Representatives and the senate leader of the same party.
- a member selected by the house and senate leaders of other party.

The members selected by the legislators were added when voters amended Article XI of the Ohio Constitution in 1967. This format ensured that no party can hold all five seats and at least one seat would belong to the minority party.

Democrats controlled the apportionment board in 1971 and 1981. Republicans controlled the apportionment board in 1991, 2001 and 2011.

In 2011, the board's members were:

- Gov. John Kasich (R)
- State Auditor Dave Yost (R)
- Secretary of State Jon A. Husted (R)
- Assembly Republican Member: Senator Tom Niehaus (R), and
- Assembly Democratic Member: Representative Armond Budish (D)

=== Ohio Redistricting Commission (2011-present) ===
Following the 2011 redistricting cycle and resulting legislative gridlock, the board was replaced by the Ohio Redistricting Commission following the passage of a constitutional amendment in 2015.

== See also ==
- History of 19th-century congressional redistricting in Ohio
- Redistricting in Ohio
