= Kerans v. Porter Paint Co. =

- Seal of the Supreme Court of Ohio
- Court: Supreme Court of Ohio
- Full case name: Kerans et al. v. Porter Paint Company
- Decided: August 21, 1991
- Citations: 575 N.E.2d 428 (OH 1991); 61 Ohio St.3d 486
- Transcript

Case history
- Prior action: Appeal from summary judgment for defendant

Holding
- An employer has a duty to provide a safe work environment and may be liable for an employee's sexual harassment that it knew or should have known about.

Court membership
- Judges sitting: Thomas J. Moyer, Alice Robie Resnick, A. William Sweeney, Andrew Douglas, Herbert R. Brown, Robert E. Holmes, J. Craig Wright

Case opinions
- Majority by Resnick; Dissent by Moyer

Kerans v. Porter Paint Co. was a leading case in Ohio on employer liability for workplace sexual harassment. In an opinion by Alice Robie Resnick, the court held that victims of harassment could bring tort claims against their employers. Resnick held that the psychological and emotional damages suffered by victims of harassment were not injuries under Ohio's workers' compensation statute, and employers were vicariously liable for the sexual harassment of their employees when they knew or should have known about the harassment.
