= Redistricting in Ohio =

Process of drawing electoral district boundaries in state of Ohio, US

Redistricting in Ohio is the process by which boundaries are redrawn for federal congressional and state legislative districts. It has historically been highly controversial. Critics have accused legislators of attempting to protect themselves from competition by gerrymandering districts.

== History ==
=== 20th century ===
In 1967, the General Assembly sent an amendment to voters which expanded the three-member Ohio Apportionment Board to include members selected by the majority and minority parties in both houses of the legislature. Voters approved the amendment in the November election.

In 1981, Issue 2, a citizen-initiated amendment which would have created a state redistricting commission was defeated, with 58% voting against.

=== 21st century ===
Similar citizen-initiated amendments to create citizen redistricting commissions were defeated in 2005 and 2012. The 2005 amendment was opposed by the Ohio Republican Party and was not endorsed by the Ohio Democratic Party, while the 2012 amendment received opposition from the Republicans and endorsement by the Democrats. The 2012 amendment was organized by a coalition including the League of Women Voters of Ohio and Common Cause Ohio, while it received opposition from the Ohio Farm Bureau Association and Ohio Chamber of Commerce. Newspapers including the Akron Beacon Journal and The Plain Dealer editorialized in opposition to the 2012 measure.

In 2015, Issue 1, which replaced the Ohio Apportionment Board with the Ohio Redistricting Commission for proposing legislative districts, was initiated by the legislature and passed with 71% voting in favor. The Redistricting Commission consists of the governor, lieutenant governor, auditor and two members each appointed by legislative leaders in both chambers. In 2018, another legislatively-initiated amendment, which extended the Redistricting Commission's powers to redraw congressional districts and mandated supermajority, bipartisan legislative support for redistricting plans, was passed with over 74% of the vote.

==== Since 2020 ====
Ohio lost the 16th district following the 2020 United States census. After the 2020 United States redistricting cycle commenced, the Ohio Redistricting Commission passed maps for the 2022–2032 decade. However, Democrats objected to the maps, and took the maps to court. The Supreme Court of Ohio overturned the initially passed state legislative maps, arguing that they unfairly favored Republicans against the guidance of Ohio's 2015 redistricting amendment that seeks to limit partisan gerrymandering. The legislature responded by passing new plans which made few modifications to the initially passed plan. The court eventually rejected the legislature's maps seven times, with Republican legislators threatening to impeach Chief Justice Maureen O'Connor, who was the deciding vote on the maps.

Following the age-limit retirement of O'Connor, a new Republican-majority Supreme Court ruled in favor of the legislature's maps. O'Connor joined the campaign of Citizens Not Politicians Ohio, which sought to place an amendment on the 2024 ballot to replace the Ohio Redistricting Commission with an independent citizens' redistricting commission. On July 23, the Ohio Secretary of State’s Office certified enough signatures for the Citizens Not Politicians ballot initiative to appear in the November election. The text of the initiative was sent to the Ohio Ballot Board, its language was disputed by state Attorney General and slightly revised, and it was slated to appear on ballots as Ohio Issue 1, which was eventually defeated.

== Current process ==
As of 2023, Ohio employs a hybrid commission as a back-up redistricting authority in the case of the state legislature failing to achieve a certain qualified majority for approval of a map. The commission is composed of elected political officials as well as appointments made by the leaders of the state legislative chambers (namely: the speaker of the house, the leader of the largest party in the house to which the speaker of the house does not belong, the president of the senate, and the leader of the largest party in the senate to which the speaker of the senate does not belong), although those appointments also were politicians in the 2020 cycle. If the redistricting commission fails to achieve a certain qualified majority for approval of a congressional redistricting plan when it has been charged to do so, the authority to pass such a plan transfers back to the state legislature, which may then pass a plan either for the full decade via a certain qualified majority, or for only four years via normal legislative procedure otherwise.
