= Miller v. Korns =

Ohio Supreme Court case

Miller v. Korns (1923) is a significant legal case in the U.S. state of Ohio. It was one of the first Ohio Supreme Court cases to challenge the Ohio State General Assembly's system of school financing.

== Background ==
The State Legislature's General Assembly redistributed excess tax revenues from some counties throughout the state to fund a fair and equal state school system. The plaintiff, however, claimed that taking tax revenue from one county to fund another violated the constitutional requirement for a "uniform system of taxation." That claim was rejected by a trial court; the trial court decision was upheld on appeal by The Ohio Supreme Court citing the state's constitutional requirement of a "thorough and efficient system of schools justified the system of taxation". The Miller v. Korns ruling is a historical and important decision because it defined "thorough" and "efficient"; it also authorized the practice of tax revenue redistribution throughout the state.

Per Article VI of the Ohio State Constitution, the General Assembly is required to provide and fund "a thorough and efficient system of common schools throughout the State." In 1821 the General Assembly authorized the voluntary use of property tax revenues to help fund and support schools. In 1822 the General Assembly strengthened this practice by mandating that a portion of property tax revenues be used to fund the state's school system. During the 1850-51 Constitutional Convention, the delegates reiterated the importance of education and recognized the state's obligation, to both present and future Ohioans, to provide an educational system that allows all citizens, regardless of race or economic standing, to fully develop their potential and contribute to a flourishing society.

== Impact and legacy ==
The Ohio Supreme Court's decision in Miller v. Korns has been a tool for educational equality in the state of Ohio. It established definitions for the words "thorough" and "efficient" which have been used in later court cases. The Ohio Supreme Court established that: "A thorough system could not mean one in which part or any number of school districts of the state were starved for funds. An efficient system could not mean one in which part or any number of the school districts of the state lacked teachers, buildings, or equipment." Miller v. Korns has since been used in Cincinnati Schools District Board of Education v. Walters (1979) and DeRolph v. State (1997) which expanded on the original decision by adding that a healthy learning environment, including teacher-student ratios, is part of a "thorough" education system.
