= Ohio's congressional districts =

Congressional districts in the U.S. state of Ohio

Map of Ohio's congressional districts from 2023 to 2027 Interactive map version

Map of Ohio's congressional districts as passed by the Ohio Redistricting Commission on October 31, 2025, and will be used at the 2026 House elections Interactive map version

Ohio is divided into 15 congressional districts, each represented by a member of the United States House of Representatives. After the 2010 census, Ohio, which up until then had 18 districts, lost two House seats due to slow population growth compared to the national average, and a new map was signed into law on September 26, 2011. Starting in the 2022 midterms, per the 2020 United States census, Ohio lost its 16th congressional seat, ending up with its current 15 districts.

== Current districts and representatives ==
This is a list of United States representatives from Ohio, their terms, their district boundaries, and the district political ratings according to the CPVI. The delegation in the 119th United States Congress has a total of 15 members, with 10 Republicans and 5 Democrats.

Current U.S. representatives from Ohio
District	Member (Residence)	Party	Incumbent since	CPVI (2026)	District map
1st	Greg Landsman (Cincinnati)	Democratic	January 3, 2023	R+1	
2nd	Dave Taylor (Amelia)	Republican	January 3, 2025	R+21	
3rd	Joyce Beatty (Columbus)	Democratic	January 3, 2013	D+21	
4th	Jim Jordan (Urbana)	Republican	January 3, 2007	R+21	
5th	Bob Latta (Bowling Green)	Republican	December 11, 2007	R+12	
6th	Michael Rulli (Salem)	Republican	June 11, 2024	R+17	
7th	Max Miller (Rocky River)	Republican	January 3, 2023	R+5	
8th	Warren Davidson (Troy)	Republican	June 7, 2016	R+8	
9th	Marcy Kaptur (Toledo)	Democratic	January 3, 1983	R+5	
10th	Mike Turner (Dayton)	Republican	January 3, 2003	R+4	
11th	Shontel Brown (Warrensville Heights)	Democratic	November 4, 2021	D+28	
12th	Troy Balderson (Zanesville)	Republican	September 5, 2018	R+15	
13th	Emilia Sykes (Akron)	Democratic	January 3, 2023	D+2	
14th	Dave Joyce (South Russell)	Republican	January 3, 2013	R+10	
15th	Mike Carey (Columbus)	Republican	November 4, 2021	R+5	

== Historical district boundaries ==
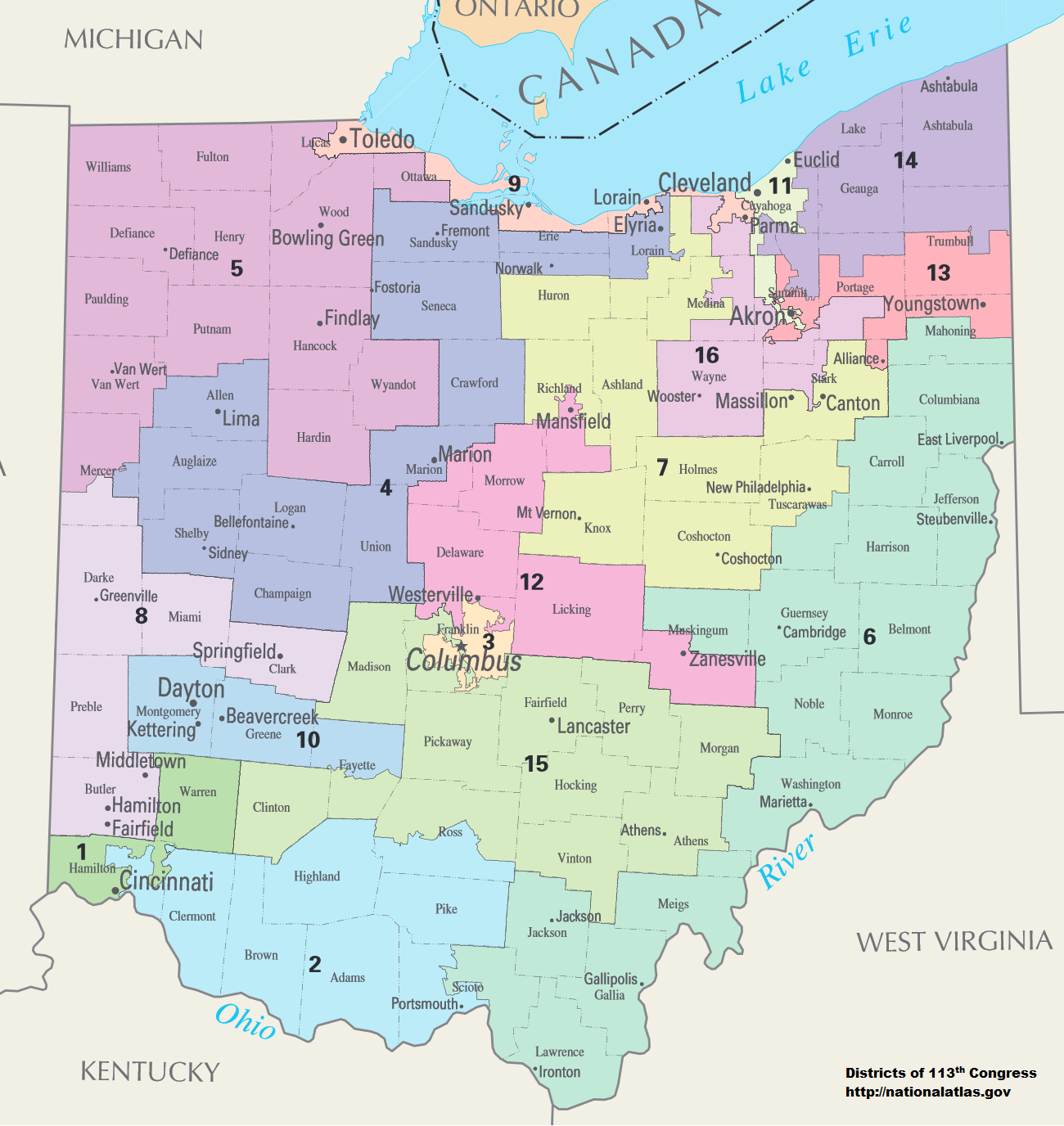
2013–2023

2003–2013

1993–2003

== Obsolete districts ==
- Ohio's at-large congressional district (1803–1813, 1913–1915, 1933–1953, 1963–1967)
- Ohio's 16th congressional district (1833–2023)
- Ohio's 17th congressional district (1833–2013)
- Ohio's 18th congressional district (1833–2013)
- Ohio's 19th congressional district (1833–2003)
- Ohio's 20th congressional district (1843–1993)
- Ohio's 21st congressional district (1843–1993)
- Ohio's 22nd congressional district (1915–1983)
- Ohio's 23rd congressional district (1953–1983)
- Ohio's 24th congressional district (1967–1973)

== Redistricting challenges ==
=== 2019 challenge ===
On May 3, 2019, a three-judge panel from the United States District Court for the Southern District of Ohio declared Ohio's 2012 district map contrary to Article One of the United States Constitution, as "an unconstitutional partisan gerrymander" and ordered "the enactment of a constitutionally viable replacement" prior to the 2020 elections. An appeal made to the U.S. Supreme Court resulted in the order to redraw the map being nullified.

=== 2022 redistricting ===
On November 17, 2021, after lengthy discussions, a new map was passed by the Ohio House of Representatives 55–36, along party lines, with no Democrat voting in favor of the map. The map was sent to Governor of Ohio, Mike DeWine, where he accepted it 3 days later on November 20.

The map was controversial, with Democrats accusing the map of being purposefully designed to benefit Republicans. By December 7, 2021, six lawsuits had been filed against the new 15-seat congressional map, citing it as "racially discriminatory" and a partisan gerrymander. The proposed map favored Republican to Democratic districts by a 12–3 margin.

On January 14, 2022, the Ohio Supreme Court declared the map a partisan gerrymander, violating Article XIX of the Constitution of Ohio, in a 4-3 decision. The Ohio General Assembly had 30 days to draw a new map, but declined to do so, passing the buck to the same 7-member political Ohio Redistricting Commission in charge of Ohio's contentious legislative redistricting.

On March 2, 2022, the Ohio Redistricting Commission adopted a second Congressional map along party lines. In the midst of ensuing legal maneuvers over this map, Ohio's 2022 primary for Congressional seats was held as scheduled on May 3, 2022, though this election did not include state legislative races, as a third set of statehouse map had been rejected on March 16, 2022, by the Ohio Supreme Court. On July 19, 2022, the Ohio Supreme Court, again on a bitterly divided 4–3 vote, ruled that the second Congressional map was also a partisan gerrymander and ordered a redraw within 30 days, but the 2022 general election was allowed to proceed on this invalidated map. Neither the state legislature nor the Ohio Redistricting Commission responded to the court's order to redraw the map.

In the 2022 general election, Republicans won the seat occupied by the retiring Chief Justice Maureen O'Connor, swinging the court toward the faction that had dissented from the earlier opinions. In response, the lawsuits over the second Congressional map were dropped, as the litigants feared the new court would permit an even greater gerrymander than the map enacted on March 2, 2022. As that map did not have bipartisan support, Ohio Constitution Article XIX limited its use to four years, requiring a new map for the 2026 elections. In 2024, a citizen ballot initiative spearheaded by O'Connor proposed transferring redistricting power to a citizen commission and enforcing strict proportionality. The initiative, appearing on ballots as Issue 1, failed essentially along party lines, based on county- and precinct-level voting results relative to U.S. presidential voting.

== See also ==
- List of United States congressional districts
- Ohio's congressional delegations
- History of 19th-century congressional redistricting in Ohio
