= Board of Education v. Walter =

Board of Education v. Walter was a 1979 Ohio Supreme Court case relating to the funding of primary and secondary schools in Ohio. The Court ruled that the method of funding public schools at the time was constitutional despite disparities in per-pupil education spending between different districts. Article VI of the Ohio Constitution states that the state must provide an "adequate system of public schools." The ruling overturned a previous trial court ruling that the State's school-funding system violated the Constitution of Ohio's requirement of providing a thorough and efficient system of public education. Board of Education v. Walter is one of the cases that played a role leading to DeRolph v. State of Ohio in 1997, which found the model of funding for public schools in Ohio to be unconstitutional.

== Background ==
The plaintiffs of this case brought suit claiming that Ohio held the responsibility to fund its public schools. The Cincinnati school board filed a class-action lawsuit on behalf of Ohio school districts that believed they were underfunded. The plaintiffs believed that the system of funding, a mixture of state and local funding, violated the constitutional requirement to provide sufficient funding to operate a school district. Furthermore, they argued that forcing a school district to adequately fund its district violated the education provisions of the State Constitution. At the trial court level, the method of funding for public schools was deemed unconstitutional. However, on appeal, the Ohio Supreme Court reversed that decision and upheld the constitutionality of the school funding method.

== The Ruling ==
The Ohio Supreme Court justices argued that despite the inequalities that existed between school districts in terms of funding and ability to raise local revenue, there was no basis to strike down the funding method. They agreed with the defendant, in this case the Cincinnati Board of Education, that local control of school districts served as a rationale to defend the funding inequalities. The court stated that the local control of school districts "meant not only the freedom to devote more money to the education of one's children but also control over and participation in the decision-making process as to how those local tax dollars are to be spent."

The court did not answer the questions of whether the Ohio General Assembly at the time fulfilled their constitutional requirement to provide a "thorough and efficient" system of public schools, despite the trial court's ruling stating that the Assembly did not. Furthermore, the court declined to state what constitutes a "thorough and efficient" system of public education. By leaving these questions unanswered, whether intentionally or not, the court allowed for the school funding model to be revisited in future court cases.

In addition, the court defended their decision by explaining that the state had taken steps to close the disparities in school funding. The state of Ohio gave extra money to school districts that levied 20 mills of property tax up to a maximum of 30 mills. The court used this rationale to explain that the inequalities were not unconstitutional because the state made an effort to even out funding through that policy. Despite upholding the method of funding, the court kept the possibility of further court cases regarding education funding alive. The Court stated that the structure of funding would become unconstitutional if a school district failed to receive enough funding from all sources that it could not operate adequately. This made it possible for the funding of schools in Ohio to be struck down in the case DeRolph v. State.
