= Texas Proposition 1 =

Texas Proposition 1 may refer to various ballot measures in Texas, including:

- 1914 Texas Proposition 1
- 2007 Texas Proposition 1
- 2021 Texas Proposition 1
- 2023 Texas Proposition 1
