= History of 19th-century congressional redistricting in Ohio =

The redistricting of United States congressional districts is made by the legislatures of the states every 10 years, immediately following the official announcement of the federal census that serves as the basis of the apportionment. It was long the practice that the apportionment thus made stood until after the next decennial census.

However, the power rests with the legislature to change or adjust the apportionment during the interim and in 1845, the tradition in Ohio of reapportioning following the decennial census was broken. For the last half of the century, it was the policy of the party in power in the legislature to secure the largest amount of political advantage in making the apportionments, and they were made whenever the political control of the assembly changed. From 1878 to 1892, the state was reapportioned six times as power oscillated between the two parties.

A partisan majority in the legislature has it in their power to so apportion the districts as to enable the minority of the voters in the state to elect a majority of the congressional delegation, or to empower a bare majority of the voters to elect almost the entire delegation, in effect disenfranchising the minority. No apportionment of Ohio was absolutely free from partisan bias.

== Constitutional background ==
=== Ohio’s legislative structure ===
Under the original Ohio constitution, state representatives were chosen annually for the term of one year, and state senators were chosen for two years, the original allotment being such that half the senators held over and one-half of the body was chosen at the annual elections, necessitating annual sessions of the legislature.

The mode of electing members of the Ohio General Assembly was changed under the constitution of 1851. Senators and representatives were elected biennially, for the term of two years, and the entire legislature changed its membership at the end of the biennial period.

The object of the change in the organic law was to obviate annual legislative sessions, but as a rule, up to the last decade of the century, annual sessions were held, the general assembly adjourning to a date in the second year of the biennial period to complete its unfinished business and consider other legislative matters.

Other changes were proposed in the Ohio Constitutional Convention of 1872–73. However, the citizens soundly rejected the proposed changes in the referendum in 1874. The next change in the state constitution did not occur until the 20th century.

=== Ohio’s county structure ===
At the time of the first apportionment in 1812, there were 40 organized counties in the state. During each of the following decennial periods up to 1851, new counties were created to the current number of 88. Where portions of the new counties came from two or more congressional districts, the voters continued to cast their ballots for representative in Congress as in the original district until the next apportionment was made.

== Territorial representation — 1799 to 1802 ==
During the Fifth, Sixth and Seventh Congresses, the Northwest Territory was represented by one at-large Territorial Delegate. These were in turn William Henry Harrison, who resigned to become governor of Indiana Territory, William McMillan, and Paul Fearing.

== Statehood representation — 1803 to 1812 ==
Ohio entered the Union on February 19, 1803 a few weeks before the end of the Seventh Congress. From 1803 to 1812, the entire state constituted a single representative district in Congress, held by Jeremiah Morrow for all five terms. In the Seventh Congress Ohio had a population of 47,500; in the Eighth, when the state was first fully represented, the population was 68,850; in the Ninth the population numbered 91,280; in the Tenth it rose to 150,965, and in the Eleventh it reached 250,325, so that the member from Ohio not only represented the largest geographical territory of any single congressman, but about three times as large a constituency as any other.

== First apportionment — 1812 to 1822 ==
The state was first apportioned into representative districts by the Act of January 14, 1812, six districts being designated.

Based on the Third Federal Census, the state was entitled to seven representatives in Congress, but this fact was overlooked at the time the apportionment was made. No attempt was made to rectify this error, the result being that Ohio was short five congressional seats during the decade, and one elector at each of the presidential elections in 1812, 1816 and 1820.

Ohio congressional districts 1812–1822
District	Counties
First	Hamilton, Warren, Butler, Preble
Second	Clermont, Highland, Fayette, Clinton, Adams, Greene
Third	Ross, Gallia, Athens, Washington, Scioto, Pickaway
Fourth	Muskingum, Guernsey, Coshocton, Belmont, Jefferson
Fifth	Licking, Delaware, Franklin, Madison, Fairfield, Champaign, Montgomery, Miami, Darke
Sixth	Tuscarawas, Stark, Columbiana, Portage, Trumbull, Cuyahoga, Geauga, Ashtabula, Knox, Wayne, Richland

== Second apportionment — 1822 to 1832 ==
The second apportionment was made on 22 May 1822. The official report of the Fourth Federal Census not having been received in time for consideration and action at the regular session, the state legislature was assembled in extraordinary session for that purpose. The state then contained 66 organized counties, and was divided into 14 districts.

Ohio congressional districts 1822–1832
District	Counties
First	Hamilton, Clermont
Second	Warren, Butler
Third	Preble, Miami, Mercer, Van Wert, Paulding, Williams, Shelby, Allen, Montgomery, Putnam.
Fourth	Greene, Clark, Champaign, Madison, Union, Logan, Hardin.
Fifth	Brown, Adams, Highland, Clinton.
Sixth	Ross, Fayette, Pickaway, Hocking.
Seventh	Scioto, Pike, Lawrence, Jackson, Gallia, Meigs, Athens, Washington.
Eighth	Franklin, Licking, Knox, Delaware, Coshocton, Marion, Crawford.
Ninth	Fairfield, Perry, Muskingum.
Tenth	Guernsey, Belmont, Morgan, Monroe.
Eleventh	Jefferson, Harrison, Tuscarawas.
Twelfth	Columbiana, Stark, Wayne.
Thirteenth	Trumbull, Portage, Geauga, Ashtabula.
Fourteenth	Cuyahoga, Medina, Richland, Huron, Sandusky, Seneca.

== Third apportionment — 1832 to 1842 ==
On 4 June 1832, the legislature convened in extraordinary session for the second time for the purpose of apportioning the state into congressional districts and continued in session 10 days to complete the apportionment.

There were 74 organized counties and they were divided into 19 districts based on the Fifth Federal Census.

Ohio congressional districts 1832–1842
District	Counties
First	Hamilton.
Second	Butler, Preble, Darke.
Third	Mercer, Van Wert, Paulding, Williams, Henry, Wood, Putnam, Allen, Shelby, Montgomery, Miami.
Fourth	Warren, Clinton, Highland.
Fifth	Brown, Clermont, Adams
Sixth	Monroe, Lawrence, Gallia, Meigs, Washington, Athens.
Seventh	Jackson, Pike, Ross, Scioto, Fayette.
Eighth	Madison, Pickaway, Franklin, Delaware, Marion.
Ninth	Perry, Morgan, Fairfield, Hocking.
Tenth	Union, Hardin, Hancock, Logan, Champaign, Clark, Greene.
Eleventh	Guernsey, Belmont.
Twelfth	Muskingum, Licking.
Thirteenth	Coshocton, Knox, Tuscarawas, Holmes.
Fourteenth	Crawford, Richland, Seneca, Huron, Sandusky.
Fifteenth	Lorain, Cuyahoga, Portage, Medina.
Sixteenth	Geauga, Ashtabula, Trumbull.
Seventeenth	Columbiana.
Eighteenth	Stark, Wayne.
Nineteenth	Jefferson, Harrison.

== Fourth apportionment — 1842 to 1845 ==
The fourth apportionment for Congress was made at the fourth extraordinary session of the legislature, convened for the purpose on 25 July 1842. The legislature in 1842 contained a Democratic majority and the apportionment debate acrimonious, the Whigs denouncing the proposed redistricting as unfair and grossly partisan. Consequently, the session ran until August 12.

This adjustment of the congressional districts subsequently became the excuse for a number of the most notorious gerrymanders at the hands of the leaders of both parties in later years.

There were 78 organized counties, which were divided into 21 districts based on the Sixth Federal Census.

Ohio congressional districts 1842–1845
District	Counties
First	Hamilton.
Second	Butler, Preble, Darke.
Third	Warren, Montgomery, Clinton, Greene.
Fourth	Miami, Clark, Champaign, Madison, Union, Logan.
Fifth	Mercer, Van Wert, Paulding, Williams, Lucas, Henry, Putnam, Allen, Shelby, Hardin, Defiance.
Sixth	Wood, Hancock, Crawford, Seneca, Sandusky, Ottawa.
Seventh	Clermont, Brown, Highland, Adams.
Eighth	Pike, Jackson, Hocking, Ross.
Ninth	Fayette, Pickaway, Fairfield.
Tenth	Franklin, Licking, Knox.
Eleventh	Delaware, Marion, Richland.
Twelfth	Scioto, Lawrence, Gallia, Meigs, Athens.
Thirteenth	Perry, Morgan, Washington.
Fourteenth	Muskingum, Guernsey.
Fifteenth	Belmont, Harrison, Monroe.
Sixteenth	Holmes, Coshocton, Tuscarawas.
Seventeenth	Jefferson, Carroll, Columbiana.
Eighteenth	Stark, Wayne.
Nineteenth	Trumbull, Portage, Summit, Mahoning.
Twentieth	Cuyahoga, Geauga, Lake, Ashtabula.
Twenty-first	Medina, Lorain, Huron, Erie.

== Fifth apportionment — 1845 to 1852 ==
The legislature in 1842 had a Democratic majority and the apportionment had been denounced by the Whigs as unfair and grossly partisan. In 1844–1845, control of the legislature was in Whig hands. On 12 March 1845, the Whigs proceeded to readjust the congressional districts, the first use of the implied legislative power to redistrict at any time, not bound strictly to the federal census. The legislature added one county to the list of those already organized.

Ohio congressional districts 1845–1852
District	Counties
First	Hamilton.
Second	Butler, Warren, Clinton.
Third	Montgomery, Greene, Preble, Darke.
Fourth	Miami, Clark, Champaign.
Fifth	Mercer, Van Wert, Paulding, Williams, Lucas, Putnam, Henry, Allen, Shelby, Hardin, Defiance.
Sixth	Wood, Hancock, Crawford, Seneca, Sandusky, Ottawa, Wyandot.
Seventh	Clermont, Highland, Brown, Adams.
Eighth	Pike, Jackson, Ross, Scioto.
Ninth	Fayette, Pickaway, Fairfield.
Tenth	Franklin, Licking, Delaware.
Eleventh	Knox, Marion, Richland.
Twelfth	Hocking, Lawrence, Gallia, Meigs.
Thirteenth	Perry, Morgan, Washington.
Fourteenth	Muskingum, Guernsey.
Fifteenth	Belmont, Harrison, Monroe.
Sixteenth	Holmes, Coshocton, Tuscarawas.
Seventeenth	Jefferson, Carroll, Columbiana.
Eighteenth	Stark, Wayne.
Nineteenth	Trumbull, Portage, Summit, Mahoning.
Twentieth	Cuyahoga, Geauga, Lake, Ashtabula.
Twenty-first	Medina, Lorain, Huron, Erie.

== Sixth apportionment — 1852 to 1862 ==
On the 11 March 1851, the eighty-eighth county was organized; no additional county has been created since then. The legislature of 1852–1853, the first elected under the new Ohio constitution, was Democratic and apportioned the state into 21 congressional districts under the Seventh Federal Census.

Ohio congressional districts 1852–1862
District	Counties
First	Hamilton (a part of).
Second	Hamilton (a part of).
Third	Butler, Preble, Montgomery.
Fourth	Miami, Darke, Shelby, Auglaize, Mercer, Allen.
Fifth	Van Wert, Paulding, Putnam, Defiance, William, Fulton, Lucas, Wood, Henry, Hancock.
Sixth	Clermont, Brown, Highland, Adams.
Seventh	Warren, Clinton, Greene, Fayette, Madison.
Eighth	Clark, Champaign, Logan, Union, Delaware.
Ninth	Hardin, Marion, Wyandot, Crawford, Seneca, Sandusky, Ottawa.
Tenth	Scioto, Lawrence, Jackson, Pike, Ross.
Eleventh	Fairfield, Hocking, Perry, Athens, Vinton, Meigs.
Twelfth	Franklin, Licking, Pickaway.
Thirteenth	Morrow, Richland, Huron, Erie.
Fourteenth	Lorain, Medina, Wayne, Ashland.
Fifteenth	Tuscarawas, Coshocton, Knox, Holmes.
Sixteenth	Morgan, Washington, Muskingum.
Seventeenth	Belmont, Guernsey, Monroe, Noble,
Eighteenth	Portage, Stark, Summit.
Nineteenth	Cuyahoga, Lake, Geauga.
Twentieth	Ashtabula, Trumbull, Mahoning.
Twenty-first	Columbiana, Jefferson, Carroll, Harrison.

== Seventh apportionment — 1862 to 1872 ==
The legislature elected in 1861 and serving during 1862 and 1863 was controlled by the Republican Party. The United States Congress had just passed an act increasing the ratio of representation, and this had the effect of reducing the number of Ohio representatives in Congress from 21 to 19, and in the rest of the Union proportionately. During the first session of the Fifty-fifth general assembly, in 1862, the state was apportioned into the 19 districts based on the Eighth Federal Census.

Ohio congressional districts 1862–1872
District	Counties
First	Hamilton (a part of).
Second	Hamilton (a part of).
Third	Montgomery, Preble, Butler, Warren.
Fourth	Darke, Shelby, Logan, Champaign, Miami.
Fifth	Van Wert, Mercer, Allen, Auglaize, Hardin, Hancock, Wyandot.
Sixth	Clermont, Brown, Highland, Clinton, Fayette.
Seventh	Greene, Clark, Madison, Franklin.
Eighth	Union, Delaware, Marion, Morrow, Richland.
Ninth	Crawford, Huron, Seneca, Erie, Sandusky, Ottawa.
Tenth	Wood, Henry. Putnam, Lucas. Paulding, Defiance, Fulton, Williams.
Eleventh	Adams, Scioto, Lawrence, Gallia, Jackson, Vinton.
Twelfth	Pike, Ross, Hocking, Pickaway, Fairfield, Perry.
Thirteenth	Licking, Muskingum, Coshocton, Knox.
Fourteenth	Holmes, Ashland, Wayne, Medina, Lorain.
Fifteenth	Meigs, Athens, Washington, Morgan, Monroe.
Sixteenth	Guernsey, Belmont, Noble, Harrison, Tuscarawas.
Seventeenth	Jefferson, Carroll, Columbiana, Stark.
Eighteenth	Cuyahoga, Summit, Lake, Mahoning.
Nineteenth	Geauga, Ashtabula, Trumbull, Portage.

== Eighth apportionment — 1872 to 1878 ==
In the seventh decennial period, Ohio regained a congressman and was entitled to 20 representatives. The legislature chosen in 1871, and sitting in 1872–1873 was controlled by the Republican Party, and during the session of 1872 apportioned the state into twenty districts based on the Ninth Federal Census.

Ohio congressional districts 1872–1878
District	Counties
First	Hamilton (a part of).
Second	Hamilton (a part of).
Third	Butler, Warren, Clinton, Fayette, Clermont.
Fourth	Darke, Preble, Montgomery, Greene.
Fifth	Defiance, Paulding, Putnam, Van Wert, Allen, Auglaize, Mercer, Shelby.
Sixth	Williams, Fulton, Henry, Wood, Lucas, Ottawa.
Seventh	Highland, Brown, Adams, Pike, Ross.
Eighth	Clark, Madison, Miami, Logan, Champaign.
Ninth	Hardin, Marion, Delaware, Union, Morrow, Knox.
Tenth	Hancock, Seneca, Sandusky, Erie, Huron.
Eleventh	Hocking, Vinton, Jackson, Scioto, Lawrence, Gallia.
Twelfth	Franklin, Pickaway, Fairfield, Perry.
Thirteenth	Licking, Muskingum, Coshocton, Tuscarawas.
Fourteenth	Wyandot, Crawford, Richland, Ashland, Holmes.
Fifteenth	Meigs, Athens, Morgan, Monroe, Washington.
Sixteenth	Jefferson, Harrison, Belmont, Noble, Guernsey.
Seventeenth	Carroll, Stark, Columbiana, Mahoning.
Eighteenth	Lorain, Medina, Wayne, Summit.
Nineteenth	Ashtabula, Trumbull, Geauga, Lake, Portage.
Twentieth	Cuyahoga.

== Ninth apportionment — 1878 to 1880 ==
The Sixty-third general assembly, elected in 1877, was controlled by the Democratic Party, and following the precedent of the Whig legislature of 1845, at its session in 1878 it revised and recast the representative districts.

The result of this readjustment of the districts was seen at the ensuing election. At the election in 1878, the head of the Republican state ticket received 274,120 votes, and the head of the Democratic ticket received 270,966 votes. Each party won ten seats. In contrast, using the earlier districting two years before in 1876, the heads of the tickets were similarly balanced (Republican 317,856, Democratic 311,220), yet voters elected 13 Republican congressmen and 7 Democrats.

Ohio congressional districts 1878–1880
District	Counties
First	Hamilton (a part of).
Second	Hamilton (a part of).
Third	Montgomery, Butler, Warren.
Fourth	Greene, Clark, Champaign, Logan, Union.
Fifth	Preble, Darke, Miami, Shelby, Auglaize, Mercer.
Sixth	Van Wert, Allen, Putnam, Paulding, Williams, Henry, Fulton.
Seventh	Lucas, Hancock, Wood, Ottawa, Sandusky.
Eighth	Seneca, Crawford, Wyandot, Hardin, Marion, Morrow,
Ninth	Franklin, Pickaway, Madison, Delaware, Fayette.
Tenth	Fairfield, Hocking, Vinton, Gallia, Meigs.
Eleventh	Clermont, Brown, Adams, Highland, Clinton.
Twelfth	Scioto, Pike, Jackson, Ross, Lawrence.
Thirteenth	Monroe, Noble, Morgan, Athens, Washington.
Fourteenth	Guernsey, Muskingum, Licking, Perry.
Fifteenth	Richland, Knox, Holmes, Coshocton, Tuscarawas.
Sixteenth	Ashland, Wayne, Stark, Portage.
Seventeenth	Erie, Huron, Lorain, Medina, Summit.
Eighteenth	Carroll, Columbiana, Jefferson, Harrison, Belmont.
Nineteenth	Geauga, Lake, Ashtabula, Trumbull, Mahoning.
Twentieth	Cuyahoga.

== Tenth apportionment — 1880 to 1882 ==
A Republican legislature was elected in 1879, and sat in 1880–1881. It proceeded at its first session to redistrict the state, and its effect upon the political campaign of the congressional delegation was pronounced. The vote for the head of the ticket was: Republican, 362,021; Democratic, 343,016. Instead of 10 members to each of the parties as in the election of 1878, the Republicans secured 14 and the Democrats 6.

Ohio congressional districts 1880–1882
District	Counties
First	Hamilton (a part of),
Second	Hamilton (a part of),
Third	Butler, Warren, Clinton, Fayette
Fourth	Darke, Preble, Montgomery, Greene.
Fifth	Defiance, Paulding, Putnam, Van Wert, Allen, Auglaize, Mercer, Shelby.
Sixth	Fulton, Henry, Wood, Lucas, Ottawa, Williams.
Seventh	Highland, Brown, Adams, Pike
Eighth	Clark, Madison, Miami, Logan, Champaign.
Ninth	Hardin, Marion, Union, Knox, Delaware, Morrow.
Tenth	Hancock, Seneca, Erie, Huron, Sandusky.
Eleventh	Hocking, Vinton, Jackson, Scioto, Lawrence, Gallia.
Twelfth	Franklin, Pickaway, Fairfield, Perry
Thirteenth	Licking, Muskingum, Coshocton, Tuscarawas.
Fourteenth	Wyandot, Crawford, Richland, Holmes, Ashland.
Fifteenth	Meigs, Athens, Morgan, Monroe, Washington.
Sixteenth	Jefferson, Harrison, Belmont, Noble, Guernsey.
Seventeenth	Carroll, Stark, Columbiana, Mahoning.
Eighteenth	Lorain, Medina, Wayne, Summit.
Nineteenth	Trumbull, Portage, Geauga, Lake, Ashtabula.
Twentieth	Cuyahoga.

== Eleventh apportionment — 1882 to 1884 ==
With the beginning of the eighth decennial period, Ohio was entitled to an additional representative in congress following the Tenth Federal Census, and there were 21 districts to be created. The legislature elected in 1882, and which met in 1883, was controlled by the Republican Party.

Ohio congressional districts 1882–1884
District	Counties
First	Hamilton (a part of).
Second	Hamilton (a part of).
Third	Preble, Montgomery, Miami.
Fourth	Darke, Shelby, Mercer, Auglaize.
Fifth	Putnam, Hancock, Wyandot, Seneca, Crawford.
Sixth	Wood, Fulton, Williams, Henry, Defiance, Paulding, Van Wert.
Seventh	Butler, Greene, Clermont, Warren.
Eighth	Clark, Champaign, Logan, Madison, Pickaway.
Ninth	Knox, Delaware, Morrow, Union, Marion, Hardin.
Tenth	Sandusky, Ottawa, Lucas, Erie.
Eleventh	Adams, Scioto, Lawrence, Gallia, Jackson, Vinton.
Twelfth	Clinton, Highland, Fayette, Ross, Brown, Pike.
Thirteenth	Fairfield, Franklin, Hocking, Perry.
Fourteenth	Richland, Ashland, Huron, Lorain.
Fifteenth	Meigs, Athens, Morgan, Monroe, Washington.
Sixteenth	Licking, Muskingum, Coshocton, Holmes, Tuscarawas.
Seventeenth	Belmont, Harrison, Jefferson, Noble, Guernsey.
Eighteenth	Carroll, Columbiana, Mahoning, Stark.
Nineteenth	Portage, Lake, Geauga, Ashtabula, Trumbull.
Twentieth	Summit, Wayne, Medina, Cuyahoga (a part of).
Twenty-first	Cuyahoga (a part of).

== Twelfth apportionment — 1884 to 1886 ==
The Sixty-sixth general assembly, 1884–1885, elected in 1883, was Democratic. However, reapportionment by the Democrats in 1884 did not work to their benefit politically. Under the Republican apportionment of 1882, 12 Democrats were elected as Congressmen to 5 for the Republicans. After the twelfth apportionment in 1884, the seats held stood Democrats 10, Republicans 11 even though the head of the Democratic state ticket received 316,874 votes to the Republicans 297,759. In 1884, the head of the Republican state ticket had received 391,597 and the Democratic ticket 380,355. There may have been local factors in 1884.

Ohio congressional districts 1884–1886
District	Counties
First	Hamilton (a part of).
Second	Hamilton (a part of).
Third	Butler, Preble, Warren, Clermont.
Fourth	Montgomery, Miami, Darke.
Fifth	Shelby, Mercer, Auglaize, Allen, Logan, Hardin.
Sixth	Williams, Defiance, Paulding, Van Wert, Putnam, Henry, Fulton.
Seventh	Wood, Seneca, Hancock, Wyandot, Crawford.
Eighth	Champaign, Clark, Greene, Clinton, Fayette.
Ninth	Marion, Union, Delaware, Morrow, Knox, Madison.
Tenth	Lucas, Ottawa, Sandusky, Erie.
Eleventh	Ross, Highland, Brown, Adams.
Twelfth	Vinton, Pike, Jackson, Scioto, Lawrence.
Thirteenth	Franklin, Fairfield, Pickaway, Hocking.
Fourteenth	Perry, Morgan, Athens, Meigs, Gallia.
Fifteenth	Tuscarawas, Coshocton, Licking, Muskingum.
Sixteenth	Lorain, Huron, Ashland, Richland, Holmes.
Seventeenth	Guernsey, Belmont, Noble, Monroe, Washington.
Eighteenth	Mahoning, Columbiana, Carroll, Harrison, Jefferson.
Nineteenth	Ashtabula, Trumbull, Geauga, Lake, Portage, Cuyahoga (a part of).
Twentieth	Summit, Medina, Stark, Wayne.
Twenty-first	Cuyahoga (a part of).

== Thirteenth apportionment — 1886 to 1890 ==
The Republicans controlled the legislature elected in 1885, and revised the Democratic apportionment of 1884 as soon as the general assembly organized in 1885. At the congressional election in 1886, under this apportionment voters elected 15 Republicans congressmen and 6 Democrats, as against 11 Republicans and 10 Democrats two years previously, even though the vote for the head of the Republican ticket in 1886 was 341,095 and for the head of the Democratic ticket, 329,314.

Ohio congressional districts 1886–1890
District	Counties
First	Hamilton (a part of).
Second	Hamilton (a part of).
Third	Preble, Miami, Montgomery.
Fourth	Allen, Darke, Shelby, Mercer, Auglaize.
Fifth	Putnam, Hancock, Wyandot, Seneca, Crawford.
Sixth	Wood, Fulton, Williams, Henry, Defiance, Paulding, Van Wert.
Seventh	Butler, Greene, Clermont, Warren.
Eighth	Clark, Pickaway, Champaign, Logan, Madison.
Ninth	Knox, Delaware, Morrow, Union, Marion, Hardin.
Tenth	Sandusky, Ottawa, Lucas, Erie.
Eleventh	Adams, Scioto, Lawrence, Gallia, Jackson, Vinton.
Twelfth	Clinton, Highland, Fayette, Brown, Ross, Pike.
Thirteenth	Franklin, Fairfield, Hocking, Perry.
Fourteenth	Richland, Ashland, Huron, Lorain.
Fifteenth	Meigs, Athens, Morgan, Monroe, Washington.
Sixteenth	Licking, Muskingum, Coshocton, Holmes, Tuscarawas.
Seventeenth	Belmont, Harrison, Jefferson, Noble, Guernsey.
Eighteenth	Carroll, Columbiana, Mahoning, Stark.
Nineteenth	Portage, Lake, Geauga, Ashtabula, Trumbull.
Twentieth	Summit, Wayne, Medina, Cuyahoga (a part of).
Twenty-first	Cuyahoga (a part. of).

== Fourteenth apportionment — 1890 to 1892 ==
In 1889 the Democrats elected a majority of the legislature, which met in 1890, and revised and reapportioned the state. Under this apportionment, voters elected 14 Democratic congressmen and 7 Republicans in 1890, when the vote for the respective heads of the Republican and Democratic state tickets stood: Republican, 363,584; Democratic, 352,579.

Ohio congressional districts 1890–1892
District	Counties
First	Hamilton (a part of).
Second	Hamilton (a part of).
Third	Butler, Montgomery, Warren.
Fourth	Champaign, Darke, Mercer, Miami, Preble, Shelby.
Fifth	Allen, Auglaize, Hardin, Logan, Putnam, Van Wert.
Sixth	Defiance, Paulding, Fulton, Henry, Williams, Wood.
Seventh	Erie, Lucas, Ottawa, Sandusky.
Eighth	Seneca, Marion, Hancock, Union, Wyandot.
Ninth	Franklin, Madison, Pickaway.
Tenth	Clark, Clinton, Fayette, Greene, Ross.
Eleventh	Adams, Brown, Clermont, Pike, Highland.
Twelfth	Athens, Gallia, Lawrence, Meigs, Scioto.
Thirteenth	Fairfield, Hocking, Jackson, Vinton, Morgan, Perry.
Fourteenth	Coshocton, Licking, Muskingum, Tuscarawas.
Fifteenth	Ashland, Crawford, Delaware, Knox, Morrow, Richland.
Sixteenth	Holmes, Medina, Wayne, Stark.
Seventeenth	Belmont, Noble, Monroe, Washington.
Eighteenth	Carroll, Columbiana, Guernsey, Harrison, Jefferson.
Nineteenth	Ashtabula, Geauga, Mahoning, Portage, Trumbull.
Twentieth	Huron, Lake, Lorain, Portage, Mahoning, Summit, Cuyahoga (a part of).
Twenty-first	Cuyahoga (a part of).

== Fifteenth apportionment — 1892 to 1902 ==
The regular decennial apportionment under the Eleventh Federal Census was due to be made in 1892. The Republicans were again in control but in 1892 succeeded only in winning 9 seats, while the Democrats won 12. At the subsequent elections, however, the Republicans succeeded in increasing their delegation to as high as 15.

Between 1892 and 1900, there were no revisions of the apportionment only because the Democrats did not secure control of the legislature.

Ohio congressional districts 1892–1902
District	Counties
First	Hamilton (a part of).
Second	Hamilton (a part of).
Third	Preble, Butler, Montgomery.
Fourth	Darke, Shelby, Mercer, Auglaize, Allen.
Fifth	Williams, Defiance, Henry, Paulding, Putnam, Van Wert.
Sixth	Greene, Warren, Clinton, Highland, Brown, Clermont.
Seventh	Miami, Clark, Madison, Fayette, Pickaway.
Eighth	Hancock, Hardin, Logan, Union, Champaign, Delaware.
Ninth	Lucas, Ottawa, Wood, Fulton.
Tenth	Pike, Jackson, Gallia, Lawrence, Adams, Scioto.
Eleventh	Meigs, Athens, Vinton, Ross, Hocking, Perry.
Twelfth	Franklin, Fairfield.
Thirteenth	Erie, Sandusky, Seneca, Crawford, Wyandot, Marion.
Fourteenth	Lorain, Huron, Ashland, Richland, Morrow, Knox.
Fifteenth	Washington, Morgan, Noble, Guernsey, Muskingum.
Sixteenth	Carroll, Jefferson, Harrison, Belmont, Monroe.
Seventeenth	Wayne, Holmes, Coshocton, Licking, Tuscarawas.
Eighteenth	Stark, Columbiana, Mahoning.
Nineteenth	Ashtabula, Geauga, Portage, Summit, Trumbull.
Twentieth	Lake, Medina, Cuyahoga (a part of).
Twenty-first	Cuyahoga (a part of).

== See also ==
- United States congressional apportionment
- Redistricting
- Ohio Apportionment Board
