= California Proposition 1 =

California Proposition 1 may refer to:

- 1998 California Proposition 1, concerning property tax valuation
- 1998 California Proposition 1A, concerning bonds related to education
- 2004 California Proposition 1A, concerning revenue collected by local government
- 2006 California Propositions 1A–E, concerning taxes and bonds for several programs
- 2008 California Proposition 1A, concerning high-speed rail
- 2009 California Propositions 1A–F, concerning several reforms to state law
- 2014 California Proposition 1, concerning bonds to upgrade California's water system
- 2018 California Proposition 1, concerning veterans' home loans and affordable housing
- 2022 California Proposition 1, concerning abortion and contraception
- 2024 California Proposition 1, concerning mental health treatment
