= November 2018 Ohio Issue 1 =

2018 ballot measure in Ohio

- The Neighborhood Safety, Drug Treatment, and Rehabilitation Amendment

Results
Choice	Votes	%
Yes	1,625,990	36.96%
No	2,773,300	63.04%
Valid votes	4,399,290	97.69%
Invalid or blank votes	103,826	2.31%
Total votes	4,503,116	100.00%

Yes
90–100%
80–90%
70–80%
60–70%
50–60%
No
90–100%
80–90%
70–80%
60–70%
50–60%
Other
Tie
No votes

Ohio Issue 1, also known as The Neighborhood Safety, Drug Treatment, and Rehabilitation Amendment, was an initiated constitutional amendment that appeared on the ballot in the U.S. state of Ohio on November 6, 2018. The measure would have reduced criminal penalties for people caught possessing and/or using drugs, reclassifying such offenses as a misdemeanor and not a felony, unless said person was convicted more than two times in a two year time span. It was rejected by Ohio voters in a landslide.

== Proposed text ==
If approved by voters, Issue 1 would have added Section 12 to Article XV of the Constitution of Ohio, appearing as so:

§12 Neighborhood Safety, Drug Treatment, and Rehabilitation Amendment

(A) Findings and Declarations.

The People of the State of Ohio find and declare that drug addiction is a serious societal problem that presents issues of public health and safety and incarcerating users rather than by providing treatment poses a threat to public safety and is an inefficient use of criminal justice resources, and further find and declare that prison spending should be focused on violent and serious offenses and preparing individuals for release through rehabilitation while maximizing alternatives for non-serious non-violent crime.

(B) Purpose of this Section and Savings Achieved from Prison Population Reduction.

(1) In adopting this Section, it is the purpose and intent of the people of the State of Ohio to ensure that state prison spending is focused on violent and serious offenses and to invest future savings generated from this Section into substance abuse treatment programs, crime victim programs, and other purposes consistent with this Section.

(2)(a) To support substance abuse treatment programs, crime victim programs, and other purposes consistent with this Section, such as adult and juvenile probation department programs, graduated responses programs, and rehabilitation programs for people in the justice system, the general assembly shall include in the State biennial budget appropriations of funds from the savings to the State achieved as a result of the implementation of this Section. The funds disbursed pursuant to this Section are intended to supplement, not supplant, funding obligations of the state and local governments.

(b) Seventy percent of the funds to be disbursed under this Section shall be disbursed to the state department of mental health and addiction services, or its successor, for a grant program funding substance abuse treatment programs, services, and supports throughout Ohio. The state department of mental health and addiction services, or its successor, shall award the grants pursuant to an application program with an emphasis on the demonstrated need of the population to be served by the applicant, the applicant's proposed use for the funds, and the applicant's demonstrated ability to achieve successful results with effective programs. The state department of mental health and addiction services, or its successor, shall conduct a biennial evaluation of the efficiency and effectiveness of the substance abuse treatment programs and services funded under this Section.

(c) Thirty percent of the funds to be disbursed under this Section shall be disbursed for purposes that are consistent with the intent of this Section, such as crime victim programs, adult and juvenile probation department programs, graduated responses programs, and rehabilitation programs for people in the justice system. To reduce further victimization of underserved victims of violent crime, at least half of such funds shall be disbursed to the attorney general for a grant program funding victim trauma recovery services. The attorney general shall conduct a biennial evaluation of the efficiency and effectiveness of the trauma recovery services for crime victims funded under this Section.

(d) The general assembly may adjust the ratio of funds to be disbursed pursuant to this division for substance abuse treatment programs, services, and supports and for other purposes consistent with this Section after the first three biennial appropriations and every three biennial appropriations thereafter. Under any adjusted ratio of funds by the general assembly, no less than fifty percent of the total funds shall be disbursed for substance abuse treatment programs, services and supports, and no less than ten percent for crime victim trauma recovery services.

(e) The funds disbursed under this division may be used by the recipients without regard to the fiscal year for which the funds were appropriated or disbursed.

(C) Sentence Credits for Rehabilitation.

The Ohio Department of Rehabilitation and Correction, or its successor, shall grant to an incarcerated individual one half of one day of credit toward satisfaction of the individual's stated sentence for each day they participate in appropriate rehabilitative, work, or educational programming, up to a maximum of twenty-five percent of the individual's stated sentence. The Ohio Department of Rehabilitation and Correction may, at its discretion, grant up to thirty days of additional credit toward satisfaction of an individual's stated sentence for completion of appropriate rehabilitative, work, or educational programming. This division shall not apply to any individuals who are serving sentences of death or life without the possibility of parole, nor to individuals serving sentences for murder, rape, or child molestation.

(D) Reclassification of Certain Non-Serious, Non-Violent Drug Offenses.

With respect to state laws that make possessing, obtaining, or using a drug or drug paraphernalia a criminal offense, in no case shall any offense be classified higher than a misdemeanor. The misdemeanor classification may be a general classification or a special classification for the offense. The sanctions authorized may not exceed those of a first-degree misdemeanor, and, for an individual's first or second conviction within a twenty-four month period, the sanctions shall not exceed probation. If an individual has more than two convictions within a twenty-four month period, then sanctions may include jail time or probation in lieu of jail time.

(E) Graduated Responses for Non-Criminal Violations of Probation.

Within ninety days of the effective date of this Section, each trial court with jurisdiction to revoke an adult's or juvenile's probation for a non-criminal violation shall prepare and submit for approval to the Ohio Department of Rehabilitation and Correction, or its successor, guidelines for graduated responses that may be imposed for such violations. An individual who, on or after the effective date of this Section, is on probation for a felony offense shall not be sent to prison on a probation revocation for non-criminal violations of the terms of their probation. Non-criminal violations shall be dealt with in accordance with guidelines for graduated responses.

(F) Retroactive Application of this Section.

(1) Any individual who, prior to the effective date of this Section, was convicted under Ohio law of an offense of possessing, obtaining, or using a drug or drug paraphernalia, or was adjudicated a delinquent based on such an offense and who has not completed their sentence for such offense, may petition the court in which the conviction or adjudication occurred to have such charge changed to the respective class of offense as determined by the general assembly in accordance with this Section, and shall be re-sentenced and/or released, unless the court makes a finding and sets forth a particularized factual basis that the individual presents a risk to the public and should not be re-sentenced and/or released.

(2) Any individual who, prior to the effective date of this Section, was convicted under Ohio law of an offense of possessing, obtaining, or using a drug or drug paraphernalia, or who was adjudicated a delinquent based on such offense, and who has completed their sentence for such offense, may petition the court in which the conviction or adjudication occurred to have such charge changed to the respective class of offense as determined by the general assembly in accordance with this Section.

(G) Provisions Do Not Apply to Convictions for the Sale, Distribution, or Trafficking of Drugs.

Divisions (D) and (F) of this Section do not apply to convictions for the sale, distribution, or trafficking of drugs or to convictions for any drug offense that, based on volume or weight, and as of January 1, 2018, was classified as a first, second, or third-degree felony offense.

(H) Provisions Do Not Apply to Convictions for Murder, Rape, or Child Molestation.

Nothing in this Section shall be construed as applying to, changing, or affecting laws or sentencing for the incarceration of individuals convicted of murder, rape, or child molestation.

(I) Calculation of Savings to the State.

(1) The general assembly shall include the appropriations set forth in Division (B) of this Section in each State biennial budget beginning with the budget commencing July 1, 2019, in a total amount equal to the projected savings in state costs that will result from the implementation of this Section during the biennium period.

(2) The projected savings in state costs shall be the sum of the following calculations:

(a) The State shall project the fewer number of days of incarceration that will be served in state prisons during the biennium as a result of Divisions (C), (D), and (F) of this Section and multiply the number by a per-diem amount of forty dollars.

(b) The State shall project the fewer number of days of incarceration that will be served in state prisons during the biennium as a result of Division (E) of this Section and multiply the number by a per-diem amount of thirty dollars.

(3) The general assembly shall enact a system to adjust appropriations under this Section at the close of the biennial budget period based upon true-ups of the projected savings.

(4) The per-diem figures used in this subdivision shall be adjusted each State biennial budget by the rate of inflation for the previous biennial budget period according to the consumer price index or its successor.

(5) In making the calculations required by this Section, the State shall use actual data or best available estimates where actual data is not available.

(J) Definitions.

As used in this Section:

(1) "Drug" means any controlled substance, compound, mixture, preparation, or analog intended to be injected, ingested, inhaled, or otherwise introduced into the human body as identified and regulated by the general assembly.

(2) "Possessing, obtaining, or using a drug" does not include possession of a drug for purposes of the sale, distribution, or trafficking of drugs

(3) "Drug paraphernalia" means any equipment, product, or material used or intended to be used in connection with the possession or use of a drug.

(4) "Possessing, obtaining, or using drug paraphernalia" does not include possession of drug paraphernalia for purposes of the sale, distribution, or trafficking of drugs.

(5) "Laws that make possessing, obtaining, or using a drug or drug paraphernalia a criminal offense" do not include laws that make it a criminal offense to possess a drug or drugs for purposes of the sale, distribution, or trafficking of drugs.

(6) "Graduated responses" means an accountability-based graduated series of sanctions and incentives designed to protect communities, hold people accountable, and prevent repeat offenses by providing appropriate responses for unlawful actions and by inducing and reinforcing law-abiding behavior. This schedule of responses may include, but is not limited to, drug treatment, community service, fines, electronic monitoring, detention other than in a county or municipal jail, detention in a county or municipal jail, but only upon the court making a finding and setting forth a particularized factual basis that the individual presents a risk to themselves or the public, and earned rewards, such as reduced sentences for compliant conduct as the trial court deems appropriate.

(7) "County or municipal jail" means a county, multicounty, municipal, municipal-county, or multicounty-municipal jail or workhouse.

(8) A "non-criminal violation" of the terms of probation includes, but is not limited to, actions such as a drug use relapse, missing a curfew, missing or being late for a probation meeting, changing an address without permission, failing to timely pay a fine, or failing to perform required community service. An action that results in a criminal conviction is not a noncriminal violation under this Section.

(9) "Probation" includes community control sanctions.

(K) Liberal Construction.

This Section shall be liberally construed to effectuate it purpose.

(L) Conflicting laws.

This Section shall supersede any conflicting state and local laws, charters, and regulations or other provisions of this constitution.

— The Neighborhood Safety, Drug Treatment, and Rehabilitation Amendment

== Endorsements ==
Yes

Statewide officials

- Richard Cordray, former director of the Consumer Financial Protection Bureau (2012-2017), former Ohio Attorney General (2009-2011), former Ohio State Treasurer (2007-2009), and nominee for governor in 2018 (Democratic)
- William O'Neill, former Ohio Supreme Court justice (2013-2018) and candidate for governor in 2018 (Democratic)
- Ted Strickland, former Governor of Ohio (2007-2011) and U.S. representative from Ohio's 6th congressional district (1997-2007, 1993-1995) (Democratic)

State senators

- Cecil Thomas, state senator from the 9th district (2015-present) (Democratic)

State representatives

- Stephanie Howse, state representative from the 11th district (2015-present) (Democratic)

Individuals

- Malcolm Jenkins, Philadelphia Eagles safety and former Ohio State University defense
- John Legend, singer, songwriter, and record producer
- Rob Richardson Jr., former chairman of the University of Cincinnati and nominee for treasurer in 2018 (Democratic)
- Mark Zuckerberg, co-founder and CEO of Facebook

Organizations

- American Civil Liberties Union
- Equality Ohio
- Faith in Public Life
- Hamilton County Democratic Party
- Indivisible Project
- Law Enforcement Action Partnership
- Move to Amend
- Ohio Education Association
- Ohio Organizing Collaborative
- Showing Up for Racial Justice
No

U.S. representatives

- Zack Space, former U.S. representative from Ohio's 18th congressional district (2007-2011) and nominee for auditor in 2018 (Democratic)

Statewide officials

- Ken Blackwell, former Ohio Secretary of State (1999-2007), former Ohio State Treasurer (1994-1999), and nominee for governor in 2006 (Republican)
- Mike DeWine, incumbent Ohio Attorney General (2011-present), former U.S. Senator from Ohio (1995-2007), former Lieutenant Governor of Ohio (1991-1994), former U.S. representative (1983-1991), and nominee for governor in 2018 (Republican)
- John Kasich, Governor of Ohio (2011-present), U.S. representative from Ohio's 12th congressional district (1983-2001), and candidate for president in 2000 and 2016 (Republican)
- Maureen O'Connor, Chief Justice of the Ohio Supreme Court (2011-present), former Associate Justice of the Ohio Supreme Court (2003-2010), and former Lieutenant Governor of Ohio (1999-2002) (Republican)
- Paul Pfeifer, former Associate Justice of the Ohio Supreme Court (1993-2017), state senator from the 26th district (1997-1992), and state representative from the 15th district (1971-1972) (Republican)
- Mary Taylor, Lieutenant Governor of Ohio (2011-present), former Ohio State Auditor (2007-2011), and state representative from the 43rd district (2003-2006) (Republican)
- Dave Yost, incumbent Ohio State Auditor (2011-present) and nominee for attorney general in 2018 (Republican)

State senators

- Larry Obhof, state senator from the 22nd district (2011-present) (Republican)

State representatives

- Keith Faber, state representative from the 84th district (2017-present, 2001-2007), state senator from the 12th district (2007-2016), and nominee for auditor in 2018 (Republican)
- Robert Sprague, state representative from the 83rd district (2011-present) and nominee for state treasurer in 2018 (Republican)
- Ryan Smith, state representative from the 93rd district (2012-present) (Republican)

Individuals

- Steve Dettelbach, former United States Attorney for the Northern District of Ohio (2009-2016) and nominee for attorney general in 2018 (Democratic)
- Bob Paduchik, co-chairman of the Republican National Committee (2017-present)

Organizations

- Citizens for Community Values
- Ohio Chamber of Commerce
- Ohio Republican Party
- Ohio State Bar Association

== Results ==
November 2018 Ohio Issue 1
Choice	Votes	%
For	1,625,990	36.96
Against	2,773,300	63.04
Total	4,399,290	100.00
Valid votes	4,399,290	97.69
Invalid/blank votes	103,826	2.31
Total votes	4,503,116	100.00
