= 2012 Arkansas Issue 1 =

Amendment 91
- Arkansas Constitutional Amendment 91

Results
Choice	Votes	%
Yes	597,215	58.21%
No	428,745	41.79%
Valid votes	1,025,960	100.00%
Invalid or blank votes	0	0.00%
Total votes	1,025,960	100.00%
- County results For: 70%–80% 60%–70% 50%–60% Against: 50%–60%

Arkansas Constitutional Amendment 91 (known as Issue 1 prior to passage) amended the Constitution of Arkansas to raise sales tax in Arkansas from 6.0% to 6.5% for 10 years to pay for improvements to the Arkansas Highway System. It was referred by the Arkansas General Assembly to voters (legislative referral), and approved by voters during the November 6, 2012 election.

== History ==
Arkansas operated the state highway system debt-free from 1972 until 1999, when voters authorized $575 million in GARVEE bonds for Interstate highway rehabilitation (later known as the Interstate Rehabilitation Program). Arkansas voters reauthorized the IRP in 2011 at the same amount to continue rehabilitating Interstate highway pavements.

Issue 1 sought to allow issuance of $1.3 billion of four-lane highway construction and improvement bonds, with a sales tax increase used as the revenue stream to pay off the bonds in ten years. The sales tax increase would end once the bonds were paid off. The annual Arkansas Poll indicated support in October, with 53 percent in favor and 42 percent opposed.

=== Support ===
The Arkansas State Highway and Transportation Department (AHTD) and Arkansas State Highway Commission strongly supported Issue 1.

- Arkansas House of Representatives and State Highway Commission member Robert S. Moore Jr.
- Arkansas State Chamber of Commerce
- Lieutenant Governor of Arkansas Mark Darr
- Former Governor of Arkansas Mike Beebe
- Frank Scott Jr.
- Move Arkansas Forward (major contributors included Walmart's Political Action Committee, Jim Walton, Tyson Foods, and SWEPCO)
- Northwest Arkansas Council
- U.S. Senator John Boozman

=== Opposition ===
- Americans for Prosperity, Arkansas chapter
- Washington County Tea Party

== Results ==
Arkansas Proposed Issue 1 (2012)
Choice	Votes	%
For	597,215	58.21
Against	428,745	41.79
Total	1,025,960	100.00

The tax went into effect on July 1, 2013. Stephens Inc. issued the bonds for the state.

AHTD Director Scott Bennett later testified to the United States House Transportation Subcommittee on Highways and Transit regarding Issue 1's success.

== See also ==
- Holford bonds
