= Alice Robie Resnick =

American judge

Associate Justice of the Ohio Supreme Court
- In office January 2, 1989 – January 1, 2007
- Preceded by: Ralph S. Locher
- Succeeded by: Robert Cupp

Personal details
- Born: Alice Robie; August 21, 1939 (age 86) Erie, Pennsylvania
- Party: Democratic
- Spouse: Melvin L. Resnick
- Education: Siena Heights University, University of Detroit Mercy

Alice Robie Resnick (born August 21, 1939) is an American attorney and jurist who served as a Justice of the Supreme Court of Ohio.

== Early life ==
Alice Robie was born on August 21, 1939, in Erie, Pennsylvania, the daughter of Adam Joseph and Alice Suzanne Spizarny Robie. She graduated from Siena Heights College in 1961 and the University of Detroit Law School in 1964. She married Melvin L. Resnick on March 20, 1970.

== Career ==
In 1988, she was the second woman in Ohio elected and third to serve on the state bench, and was reelected in 1994 and 2000. Her career has included experience as a private attorney, assistant county prosecutor, municipal judge, and as a judge on the Ohio Sixth District Court of Appeals.

One of her most controversial opinions was the 4–3 majority ruling that Ohio's school funding system was unconstitutional.

On January 17, 2006, Resnick announced that she would not seek a fourth term. She left office on January 1, 2007.

Resnick was selected in 1995 to the Ohio Women's Hall of Fame.

== Conviction ==
On January 31, 2005, she was arrested by the Ohio State Highway Patrol for DUI. Several motorists had used cell phones to call in a Jeep Grand Cherokee showing erratic driving. State police confronted her in a gas station and she refused a field sobriety test, resulting in the one-year automatic suspension of her license. After refusal, she ignored police orders to remain at the gas station and drove off. She was pulled over a few minutes later and failed a sobriety test. Justice Resnick registered a Blood Alcohol Concentration of 0.22, nearly three times the legal limit in the state of Ohio. A dashboard camera recorded the incident, and much of the audio showing Justice Resnick trying to use her office to get out of the DUI charge appeared on the internet. She was convicted of DUI, a first degree misdemeanor, required to take a three-day alcohol education program, and her license was suspended for six months, overriding the automatic suspension of one year. She was not charged with failure to comply with a police officer, resisting arrest, or fleeing from police. A new state law also implemented a mandatory jail sentence for offenders who refuse a sobriety test and show greater than a 0.17 BAC. The incident and penalty sparked a wave of public criticism, especially after portions of the 90-minute videotape surfaced on various internet video websites.
