= DeRolph v. State =

Landmark case in Ohio constitutional law

- Seal of the Supreme Court of Ohio
- Full case name: DeRolph et al., Appellants, v. The State of Ohio et al., Appellees.
- Decided: 1997-03-24
- Citation: 78 Ohio St.3d 193

Case opinions
- Ohio's elementary and secondary public school financing system violates Section 2, Article VI of the Ohio Constitution

Keywords
- Constitutional law; Education

DeRolph v. State is a landmark case in Ohio constitutional law in which the Supreme Court of Ohio ruled that the state's method for funding public education was unconstitutional. On March 24, 1997, the Supreme Court of Ohio ruled in a 4–3 decision that the state funding system "fails to provide for a thorough and efficient system of common schools," as required by the Ohio Constitution, and directed the state to find a remedy. The court would look at the case several times over the next 12 years before it relinquished jurisdiction, but the underlying problems with the school funding system remain to this day.

== Background ==
Following Ohio's 1851 constitutional convention, voters approved a new constitution that included provisions requiring a "thorough and efficient system of common schools throughout the State." In 1923 the Supreme Court defined "thorough" and "efficient" in the landmark Miller v. Korns case.

Historically, Ohio's public schools have been funded with a combination of local property tax revenue and money from the state. This led to disparities in the quality of education in more affluent districts, where high property values led to greater funding, and urban and rural districts, where low property values left students with funding shortfalls and dilapidated facilities.

Funding became even more difficult for districts in 1976, when House Bill 920 went into effect, essentially freezing the revenue from property taxes. A millage tax would usually generate more revenue as the value of property in a district increased, but HB 920 required county auditors to cut the tax rate to bring in the same amount of revenue each year. Even as inflation increased costs for schools, their revenue could not keep up, which forced them to ask voters to approve new levies every few years.

Over the next 30 years, the state's school districts would send nearly 10,000 levies to the ballot. Voters grew weary of the constant campaigns, and unaware of the intricacies of the funding scheme, they often questioned why schools were constantly running out of money.

Districts in both poor and affluent areas found the funding system unsustainable, and in 1988, superintendents from districts in underfunded areas in southeast Ohio formed the Coalition of Rural and Appalachian Schools to work together to address the problem. Lacking the funding to mount a serious legal challenge, they invited districts from around the state to join a new coalition: The Ohio Coalition for Equity & Adequacy of School Funding.

The coalition, a council of governments representing nearly every school district in the state, was formed in 1991. It filed a complaint in the Perry County Court of Common Pleas on December 19, 1991, on behalf of Nathan DeRolph, a 15-year-old freshman at Sheridan High School and 550 school districts in the state. Represented by Bricker & Eckler LLP, the coalition named the state, the Ohio Board of Education, its superintendent, and the Ohio Department of Education as defendants in the suit, which alleged that the funding system did not meet the constitutional standard for thoroughness or efficiency and presented an exhaustive body of evidence demonstrating that the system produced unequal, inefficient, and inadequate results.

The allegations went mostly unchallenged by the state, which in fact produced its own witnesses to testify to the inadequacy of the funding system. Held at the Perry County Courthouse in New Lexington, the case produced a 30-day trial, a transcript more than 5,600 pages long and 450 exhibits before the trial judge, Linton D. Lewis, Jr., ruled on July 1, 1994 that Ohioans had a fundamental right to a state-funded education and that the state's system for providing that education was unconstitutional. Furthermore, he ordered the board of education to devise a means for the General Assembly to eliminate wealth-based disparities in education.

Although the board voted not to appeal, the attorney general's office, which represents the state, filed a notice of appeal to the Fifth District Court of Appeals, based in Canton. The appeals court's 2-1 decision, handed down on August 30, 1995, held that a previous ruling by the state supreme court permitted disparities in education if the state provided for a basic education.

Two months later, the coalition appealed to the Supreme Court of Ohio.

== DeRolph I ==
=== Prologue ===
In the days before the court heard the case, there was uncertainty on both sides as to how the justices would rule. The justices could be pigeonholed on certain issues but on education, their leanings were harder to categorize. Senate President Pro Tempore Richard Finan said that a ruling for the plaintiffs would be a "worst-case scenario" for the legislature because any solution put forward would be challenged as well while William L. Phillis, the director of the coalition, cast the decision as one between educating children for a rapidly evolving world or letting them fall behind.

The case reached the Ohio Supreme Court on September 10, 1996. Chief Justice Thomas Moyer tripled the length of oral arguments, by letting each side present for ninety minutes. Bricker's Nicholas A. Pittner argued for the schools while Solicitor General Jeffrey Sutton defended the state.

Pittner reiterated arguments that unequal funding and dilapidated buildings left some students with less opportunity than others. Sutton conceded that there were problems with the system but argued that they should be fixed locally, not by the court. He said that the state constitution guaranteed students an education for free, not the best possible education for free.

Justices peppered both sides with questions, asking whether anyone should be held to account for funding inadequacies and focusing also on school facilities around the state, which Pittner noted were sometimes in such poor condition that they did not meet even the state's minimum standards for a humane prison.

=== The decision ===
By the time the justices adjourned to deliberate, two justices, Andrew Douglas and Paul Pfeifer, had decided that the funding system was unconstitutional and needed to be changed. Meanwhile, Justice Deborah L. Cook was adamant that the court should not be involved in school funding decisions and "never budged from that position," but neither side had made that claim.

A majority emerged among Justices Douglas, Pfeifer, Alice Robie Resnick, and Francis E. Sweeney, Sr. Meanwhile, Chief Justice Moyer and Justice Evelyn Lundberg Stratton indicated they were likely to join Cook but expressed more flexibility, depending on the language of the majority opinion, which was randomly assigned to Sweeney. Although formal deliberations had lasted about only half an hour, the justices continued to discuss the case one on one, as Sweeney tried to coax Moyer and Stratton into the majority.

However, in the end, the decision was carried by the narrow, 4-3 majority that emerged after oral arguments. The March 24, 1997 ruling did the following:

- it found the funding scheme for elementary and secondary education to be unconstitutional.
- It ordered an end to the "school foundation program" and the reliance on property taxes for school funding
- It provided the state 12 months to solve the problem.
- It awarded attorney's fees to the plaintiffs.
- It remanded the case to the trial judge.

Resnick, Pfeifer, and Douglas each wrote separate concurring opinions. For the minority, Moyer's dissent acknowledged problems with school funding but questioned whether they actually violated the state constitution and argued that they were matters for the legislature to handle.

=== Reaction ===
The next day, Gov. George Voinovich, Senate President Richard H. Finan and House Speaker Jo Ann Davidson called a press conference to denounce the ruling. Voinovich suggested that his administration might defy the decision, and he classified the ruling as "judicial activism" and "a thinly veiled call for a massive, multi-billion tax increase."

Editorial boards at the largest papers in the state joined in, perhaps prodded by the governor's aides who argued that the decision put too much power in the hands of an unknown rural judge, echoing complaints by Republican Party lawmakers. The Plain Dealer wrote that "almost any other outcome would have been preferable." The Columbus Dispatch called the ruling "one highly injudicious lurch" and dismissed claims that most districts in the state were underfunded. The Cincinnati Enquirer went as far as calling for a constitutional amendment that would trump the ruling, saying that otherwise, "education policy for 11 million Ohio residents will be dictated in a rural flyspeck on the state map."

The next week, the state filed a motion to reconsider, asking the court (1) whether property taxes could still be used to fund schools at all, (2) whether school funding debts remained valid even though repayment provisions extended beyond the court's deadline to find a new funding system, and (3) to retain jurisdiction over the case instead of sending it back to the trial court. The coalition opposed the motion, saying that the ruling was clear enough and that the state needed to instead get about the business of providing additional funding.

Later that month, the court issued a ruling clarifying that property taxes could still be used if they were not the primary revenue source for school funding, debts remained valid, and the case would return to the trial judge, but appeals of his decision would bypass the Court of Appeals and go directly back to the Ohio Supreme Court.
