= 1914 Texas Proposition 1 =

Referendum on initiative and referendum

- November 3, 1914

Results
Choice	Votes	%
Yes	62,371	48.29%
No	66,785	51.71%

Yes
90–100%
80–90%
70–80%
60–70%
50–60%
No
90–100%
80–90%
70–80%
60–70%
50–60%
Other
Tie
No votes

Proposition 1 appeared on the November 3, 1914, ballot in the state of Texas as a legislatively referred constitutional amendment. The amendment proposed that citizens of Texas be given the ability to initiate state laws by gathering the signatures of twenty percent of voters, and thereafter by having the petition be decided by all voters via referendum. The amendment also would have allowed for veto referendums with the same 20% signature requirement. The measure narrowly failed, with about 51.7% of voters opposed.

== Background ==
=== Legislative passage ===
Senate Joint Resolution No. 12 (SJR 12) placed the amendment on the ballot. The Texas Senate passed SJR 12 by a 21–7 vote on March 3, 1913, and the Texas House, on March 31, passed SJR 12, with amendments to the resolution, by a 98–29 vote. The Texas Senate concurred with the House's amendments by a 23–6 vote the same day, March 31. The House's change to the resolution was authored by Representative Tarver; it deleted from the resolution language stating that the power to enact or reject laws was "independent of the legislature".

When adopted by the Texas House, some representatives wrote a reason for their vote in the House Journal; Representative Taylor said he voted in favor to allow voters to decide the issue themselves, but reserved "the right to vote and work against its adoption." Representative Lane also voted in favor but believed that the amendment was an "impracticable and dangerous experiment".

=== State comparison ===
The requirement to gather 20% of Texas voters' signatures would have been the highest number of signatures needed for the initiative and referendum process compared to any other state.

== Contents and amendment ==
=== Ballot wording ===
On the ballot, voters were provided with the following two options:

For the amendment to Section 1, of Article 3, of the Constitution of the State of Texas, providing for the initiative and referendum.
Against the amendment to Section 1, Article 3, of the Constitution of the State of Texas, providing for the initiative and referendum.

=== Amendment language ===
The measure proposed that constitution be amended to add Section 1 to Article 3:

Section 1. The legislative power of this State shall be vested in a Senate and House of Representatives, which, together, shall be styled “The Legislature of the State of Texas,” but the people reserve to themselves, power, as herein provided, to propose laws and to enact or reject the same at the polls, and to approve or reject at the polls any law, or any part of any law, enacted by the Legislature. The Legislature shall provide by law for submitting to the vote of the people, upon the petition of twenty per cent. of the qualified voters of the State the enactment of laws and the approval or rejection of any law enacted by the Legislature.

== Results ==
=== By county ===
134 counties voted in favor of the amendment, 108 counties voted against, 10 counties cast no votes, and Hutchinson County's vote was tied. The highest level of support came from Winkler County, with 100% of its 3 votes cast in favor, and the lowest level came from Willacy County, with 3.23% of its votes in favor.

Results by county
County	Yes		No	
County	#	%	#	%
Anderson	872	54.64%	724	45.36%
Andrews	27	60.00%	18	40.00%
Angelina	455	68.32%	211	31.68%
Aransas	93	75.00%	31	25.00%
Archer	123	41.69%	172	58.31%
Armstrong	46	47.42%	51	52.58%
Atascosa	190	67.62%	91	32.38%
Austin	236	22.33%	821	77.67%
Bailey	0	/	0	/
Bandera	161	46.80%	183	53.20%
Bastrop	311	39.17%	483	60.83%
Baylor	136	53.97%	116	46.03%
Bee	164	58.78%	115	41.22%
Bell	681	41.07%	977	58.93%
Bexar	1540	48.13%	1660	51.88%
Blanco	135	45.15%	164	54.85%
Borden	24	58.54%	17	41.46%
Bosque	329	41.70%	460	58.30%
Bowie	530	65.51%	279	34.49%
Brazoria	316	52.32%	288	47.68%
Brazos	178	40.36%	263	59.64%
Brewster	26	34.67%	49	65.33%
Briscoe	25	43.10%	33	56.90%
Brooks	28	45.16%	34	54.84%
Brown	312	36.75%	537	63.25%
Burleson	155	27.05%	418	72.95%
Burnet	150	38.36%	241	61.64%
Caldwell	217	34.44%	413	65.56%
Calhoun	134	56.54%	103	43.46%
Callahan	245	51.26%	233	48.74%
Cameron	484	87.36%	70	12.64%
Camp	160	28.93%	393	71.07%
Carson	36	72.00%	14	28.00%
Cass	368	41.07%	528	58.93%
Castro	43	67.19%	21	32.81%
Chambers	84	55.63%	67	44.37%
Cherokee	583	40.97%	840	59.03%
Childress	130	55.32%	105	44.68%
Clay	258	52.87%	230	47.13%
Cochran	0	/	0	/
Coke	94	41.05%	135	58.95%
Coleman	328	43.44%	427	56.56%
Collin	770	48.00%	834	52.00%
Collingsworth	190	62.09%	116	37.91%
Colorado	155	29.36%	373	70.64%
Comal	121	21.88%	432	78.12%
Comanche	475	40.77%	690	59.23%
Concho	169	61.90%	104	38.10%
Cooke	364	39.39%	560	60.61%
Coryell	196	25.36%	577	74.64%
Cottle	144	71.64%	57	28.36%
Crane	0	/	0	/
Crockett	12	52.17%	11	47.83%
Crosby	60	43.17%	79	56.83%
Culberson	8	32.00%	17	68.00%
Dallam	99	64.29%	55	35.71%
Dallas	1845	48.39%	1968	51.61%
Dawson	21	56.76%	16	43.24%
De Witt	229	28.66%	570	71.34%
Deaf Smith	65	58.04%	47	41.96%
Delta	369	49.07%	383	50.93%
Denton	353	34.07%	683	65.93%
Dickens	70	61.40%	44	38.60%
Dimmit	85	73.91%	30	26.09%
Donley	132	50.38%	130	49.62%
Dunn	0	/	0	/
Duval	465	97.89%	10	2.11%
Eastland	509	50.10%	507	49.90%
Ector	25	43.10%	33	56.90%
Edwards	27	61.36%	17	38.64%
El Paso	569	46.56%	653	53.44%
Ellis	942	50.62%	919	49.38%
Erath	555	51.72%	518	48.28%
Falls	564	49.39%	578	50.61%
Fannin	631	41.76%	880	58.24%
Fayette	431	27.68%	1126	72.32%
Fisher	203	63.44%	117	36.56%
Floyd	183	72.91%	68	27.09%
Foard	0	/	0	/
Fort Bend	197	38.48%	315	61.52%
Franklin	112	34.78%	210	65.22%
Freestone	314	49.92%	315	50.08%
Frio	107	62.94%	63	37.06%
Gaines	18	58.06%	13	41.94%
Galveston	588	67.20%	287	32.80%
Garza	30	60.00%	20	40.00%
Gillespie	202	32.17%	426	67.83%
Glasscock	9	34.62%	17	65.38%
Goliad	94	32.87%	192	67.13%
Gonzales	320	41.03%	460	58.97%
Gray	97	75.19%	32	24.81%
Grayson	925	50.77%	897	49.23%
Gregg	137	41.52%	193	58.48%
Grimes	168	39.25%	260	60.75%
Guadalupe	431	28.26%	1094	71.74%
Hale	146	61.34%	92	38.66%
Hall	205	65.92%	106	34.08%
Hamilton	155	29.81%	365	70.19%
Hansford	39	75.00%	13	25.00%
Hardeman	211	60.81%	136	39.19%
Hardin	0	/	0	/
Harris	1765	57.77%	1290	42.23%
Harrison	246	51.25%	234	48.75%
Hartley	22	61.11%	14	38.89%
Haskell	468	61.18%	297	38.82%
Hays	226	53.05%	200	46.95%
Hemphill	72	68.57%	33	31.43%
Henderson	694	46.39%	802	53.61%
Hidalgo	314	57.30%	234	42.70%
Hill	496	41.03%	713	58.97%
Hockley	0	/	0	/
Hood	187	42.40%	254	57.60%
Hopkins	681	48.47%	724	51.53%
Houston	540	49.86%	543	50.14%
Howard	183	57.91%	133	42.09%
Hunt	988	50.05%	986	49.95%
Hutchinson	14	50.00%	14	50.00%
Irion	31	62.00%	19	38.00%
Jack	216	44.81%	266	55.19%
Jackson	141	66.20%	72	33.80%
Jasper	187	45.17%	227	54.83%
Jeff Davis	7	70.00%	3	30.00%
Jefferson	363	58.45%	258	41.55%
Jim Hogg	64	85.33%	11	14.67%
Jim Wells	108	59.34%	74	40.66%
Johnson	586	54.26%	494	45.74%
Jones	317	56.01%	249	43.99%
Karnes	171	37.92%	280	62.08%
Kaufman	682	53.20%	600	46.80%
Kendall	66	32.84%	135	67.16%
Kent	38	51.35%	36	48.65%
Kerr	142	59.92%	95	40.08%
Kimble	52	60.47%	34	39.53%
King	5	41.67%	7	58.33%
Kinney	7	70.00%	3	30.00%
Kleberg	235	75.08%	78	24.92%
Knox	179	49.18%	185	50.82%
La Salle	32	51.61%	30	48.39%
Lamar	633	56.12%	495	43.88%
Lamb	10	58.82%	7	41.18%
Lampasas	97	30.41%	222	69.59%
Lavaca	718	48.12%	774	51.88%
Lee	202	34.30%	387	65.70%
Leon	365	54.89%	300	45.11%
Liberty	177	55.66%	141	44.34%
Limestone	471	43.98%	600	56.02%
Lipscomb	78	90.70%	8	9.30%
Live Oak	104	80.00%	26	20.00%
Llano	0	/	0	/
Loving	0	/	0	/
Lubbock	110	60.11%	73	39.89%
Lynn	41	66.13%	21	33.87%
Madison	187	38.96%	293	61.04%
Marion	95	55.88%	75	44.12%
Martin	27	50.94%	26	49.06%
Mason	70	46.67%	80	53.33%
Matagorda	318	68.68%	145	31.32%
Maverick	41	82.00%	9	18.00%
McCulloch	256	53.00%	227	47.00%
McLennan	530	43.19%	697	56.81%
McMullen	10	62.50%	6	37.50%
Medina	246	39.05%	384	60.95%
Menard	48	57.83%	35	42.17%
Midland	65	51.18%	62	48.82%
Milam	759	53.75%	653	46.25%
Mills	206	39.39%	317	60.61%
Mitchell	141	70.85%	58	29.15%
Montague	463	50.11%	461	49.89%
Montgomery	252	56.12%	197	43.88%
Moore	8	66.67%	4	33.33%
Morris	130	38.01%	212	61.99%
Motley	32	60.38%	21	39.62%
Nacogdoches	429	37.63%	711	62.37%
Navarro	524	47.81%	572	52.19%
Newton	90	56.60%	69	43.40%
Nolan	179	49.31%	184	50.69%
Nueces	487	65.11%	261	34.89%
Ochiltree	31	77.50%	9	22.50%
Oldham	17	62.96%	10	37.04%
Orange	164	65.86%	85	34.14%
Palo Pinto	513	58.36%	366	41.64%
Panola	355	47.84%	387	52.16%
Parker	729	60.55%	475	39.45%
Parmer	15	88.24%	2	11.76%
Pecos	71	60.68%	46	39.32%
Polk	173	46.13%	202	53.87%
Potter	206	74.91%	69	25.09%
Presidio	25	30.86%	56	69.14%
Rains	309	71.36%	124	28.64%
Randall	53	53.00%	47	47.00%
Reagan	11	34.38%	21	65.63%
Real	33	33.67%	65	66.33%
Red River	541	55.20%	439	44.80%
Reeves	79	66.39%	40	33.61%
Refugio	224	56.42%	173	43.58%
Roberts	29	58.00%	21	42.00%
Robertson	279	43.06%	369	56.94%
Rockwall	220	51.04%	211	48.96%
Runnels	220	42.31%	300	57.69%
Rusk	300	25.30%	886	74.70%
Sabine	85	34.98%	158	65.02%
San Augustine	143	40.40%	211	59.60%
San Jacinto	60	33.15%	121	66.85%
San Patricio	180	55.56%	144	44.44%
San Saba	178	35.39%	325	64.61%
Schleicher	12	17.65%	56	82.35%
Scurry	191	53.80%	164	46.20%
Shackelford	82	46.07%	96	53.93%
Shelby	653	55.67%	520	44.33%
Sherman	34	62.96%	20	37.04%
Smith	1025	54.73%	848	45.27%
Somervell	105	46.05%	123	53.95%
Starr	199	30.71%	449	69.29%
Stephens	131	51.78%	122	48.22%
Sterling	46	41.07%	66	58.93%
Stonewall	139	75.14%	46	24.86%
Sutton	40	68.97%	18	31.03%
Swisher	56	56.57%	43	43.43%
Tarrant	2437	61.92%	1499	38.08%
Taylor	361	53.72%	311	46.28%
Terrell	10	47.62%	11	52.38%
Terry	36	65.45%	19	34.55%
Throckmorton	145	56.42%	112	43.58%
Titus	306	40.10%	457	59.90%
Tom Green	212	58.89%	148	41.11%
Travis	495	40.21%	736	59.79%
Trinity	172	44.22%	217	55.78%
Tyler	99	30.28%	228	69.72%
Upshur	329	56.82%	250	43.18%
Upton	8	38.10%	13	61.90%
Uvalde	150	60.98%	96	39.02%
Val Verde	104	66.24%	53	33.76%
Van Zandt	805	52.75%	721	47.25%
Victoria	201	30.55%	457	69.45%
Walker	228	34.76%	428	65.24%
Waller	111	35.13%	205	64.87%
Ward	59	66.29%	30	33.71%
Washington	85	13.22%	558	86.78%
Webb	123	41.00%	177	59.00%
Wharton	186	45.26%	225	54.74%
Wheeler	116	68.24%	54	31.76%
Wichita	304	61.41%	191	38.59%
Wilbarger	213	50.59%	208	49.41%
Willacy	1	3.23%	30	96.77%
Williamson	522	46.11%	610	53.89%
Wilson	152	33.33%	304	66.67%
Winkler	3	100.00%	0	0.00%
Wise	447	43.57%	579	56.43%
Wood	559	47.25%	624	52.75%
Yoakum	14	66.67%	7	33.33%
Young	294	58.22%	211	41.78%
Zapata	0	/	0	/
Zavala	56	72.73%	21	27.27%

=== By congressional district ===
Five congressional districts voted in favor, and 11 voted against. District 12 had the highest percentage of votes in favor, with 55.59% in favor, and District 10 had the lowest, with 36.77% in favor. (Note: County results, as shown above, were summed by congressional districts; Texas did not split any counties across districts at the time of the referendum. Note: the above source omits Coke County from the 16th district; newspaper reporting from that time period confirms that this county was in fact in that district.)

Results by congressional district
CD	Yes		No	
CD	#	%	#	%
1	3,925	48.34%	4,195	51.66%
2	3,852	48.20%	4,139	51.80%
3	4,531	47.92%	4,924	52.08%
4	3,623	49.33%	3,721	50.67%
5	3,832	47.29%	4,271	52.71%
6	2,525	47.67%	2,772	52.33%
7	2,666	53.66%	2,302	46.34%
8	3,509	46.06%	4,109	53.94%
9	3,731	41.46%	5,269	58.54%
10	2,213	36.77%	3,805	63.23%
11	2,126	39.96%	3,194	60.04%
12	5,074	55.59%	4,053	44.41%
13	6,149	52.92%	5,470	47.08%
14	3,803	41.83%	5,288	58.17%
15	4,738	53.66%	4,091	46.34%
16	6,074	53.48%	5,283	46.52%

== Aftermath and analysis ==
=== Closeness of vote ===
Three days after the referendum, the Wichita Weekly Times reported that Proposition 1, and the other two constitutional amendments that voters decided at the election, had likely failed. The paper said, however, that a "possibility" remained that Proposition 1 would succeed, as it was only losing slightly.

=== Rural and urban vote ===
In general, urban voters backed the amendment, while rural voters opposed it. Analysis from newspapers shows that rural voters may have been what caused the amendment to fail.
