= New York Proposition 1 =

New York Proposition 1 may refer to:

- 2017 New York Proposition 1, regarding the New York Constitution
- 2021 New York Proposal 1, regarding the New York State Senate
- 2024 New York Proposal 1, also known as the New York Equal Rights Amendment
- 2025 New York Proposal 1, regarding the Use of Mount Van Hoevenberg Sports Complex Land
