= May 2018 Ohio Issue 1 =

Issue 1
- Congressional Redistricting Procedures Amendment

Results
Choice	Votes	%
Yes	1,178,468	74.89%
No	395,088	25.11%
Total votes	1,573,556	100.00%

Yes
90–100%
80–90%
70–80%
60–70%
50–60%
No
90–100%
70–80%
60–70%
50–60%
Other
Tie
No data

Ohio Issue 1, the Congressional Redistricting Procedures Amendment, was a legislatively referred constitutional amendment on the May 8, 2018 ballot in Ohio. The ballot measure was approved with 74.89% of the vote.

== Text ==
The proposal appeared on the ballot as follows:

To amend the version of Section 1 of Article XI that is scheduled to take effect January 1, 2021, and to enact Sections 1, 2, and 3 of Article XIX of the Constitution of the State of Ohio to establish a process for congressional redistricting.

A majority yes vote is necessary for the amendment to pass. The proposed amendment would:

- End the partisan process for drawing congressional districts, and replace it with a process with the goals of promoting bipartisanship, keeping local communities together, and having district boundaries that are more compact.
- Ensure a transparent process by requiring public hearings and allowing public submission of proposed plans.
- Require the General Assembly or the Ohio Redistricting Commission to adopt new congressional districts by a bipartisan vote for the plan to be effective for the full 10-year period.
- Require that if a plan is adopted by the General Assembly without significant bipartisan support, it cannot be effective for the entire 10-year period and must comply with explicit antigerrymandering requirements.

If passed, the amendment will become effective immediately.

== Results ==
Proposal 2
Choice	Votes	%
For	1,178,468	74.89
Against	395,088	25.11
Total	1,573,556	100.00

The amendment was approved in a landslide, with 74.89% of the vote.

== See also ==
- November 2018 Ohio Issue 1
