= Sphere (venue) =

Entertainment venue in the Las Vegas Valley, United States

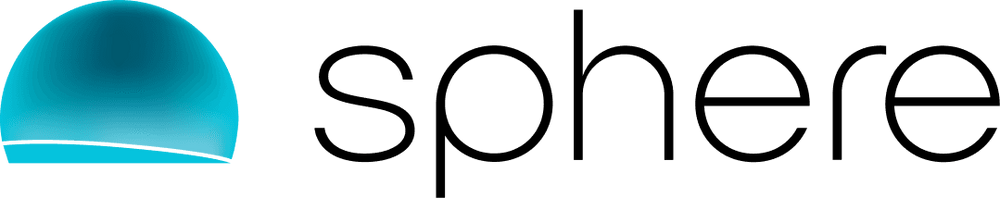

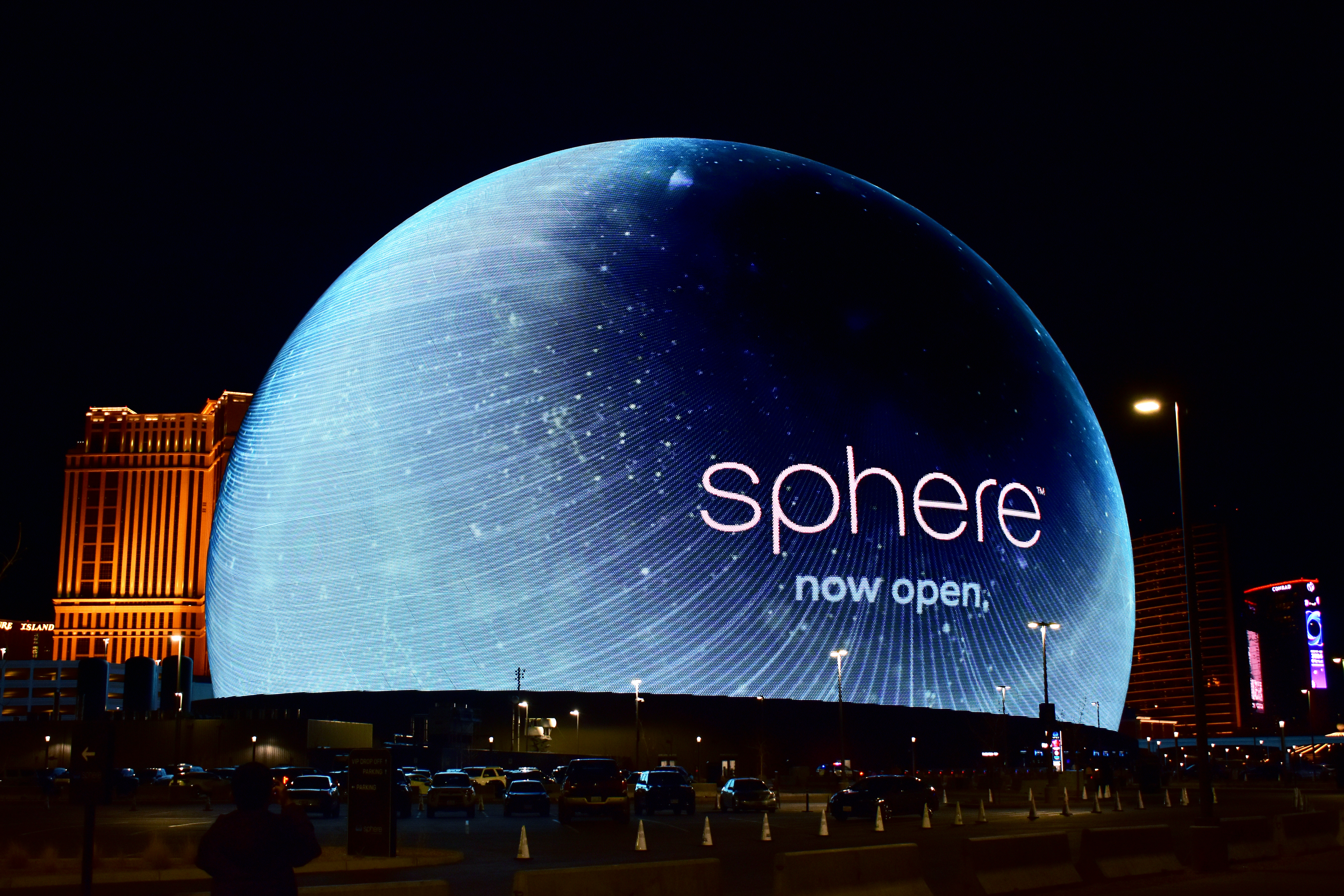
- The Sphere in 2024

- Location in Nevada Location in the United States Location in North America
- Interactive map of Sphere
- Address: 255 Sands Avenue
- Location: Paradise, Nevada, U.S.
- Coordinates: 36°07′16″N 115°09′43″W
- Owner: Sphere Entertainment; Vici Properties
- Operator: Sphere Entertainment
- Capacity: 17,600 (seated); 20,000 (including floor)
- Executive suites: 23
- Acreage: 18
- Public transit: Las Vegas Monorail (proposed)

Construction
- Groundbreaking: September 27, 2018; 8 years ago
- Built: 2019–2023
- Opened: September 29, 2023; 3 years ago
- Cost: $2.3 billion
- Architect: Populous
- Structural engineers: Severud Associates; Walter P Moore
- General contractors: AECOM; Madison Square Garden

Website
- www.thesphere.com

Sphere (also known as Sphere at the Venetian Resort or Las Vegas Sphere) is a music and entertainment arena in Paradise, Nevada, United States, east of the Las Vegas Strip. Designed by Populous, the project was announced by the Madison Square Garden Company in 2018, known then as the MSG Sphere. The venue, which seats 17,600 people and has total capacity of 20,000, is being marketed for its immersive video and audio capabilities, which include a 16K resolution wraparound interior LED screen, speakers with beamforming and wave field synthesis technologies, and 4D physical effects. The venue's exterior also features 580,000 sq ft (54,000 m^{2}) of LED displays, making it the largest in the world. Sphere measures 366 feet (112 m) high and 516 feet (157 m) wide; it would be the largest spherical building on Earth, if it were not a geodesic dome. (Note: A large amount of the spherical exterior is open to nature; therefore, it doesn't count as a building. The venue's interior is a bulging cylinder with a spherical cap, and thus is not a proper spherical building.) The arena cost $2.3 billion, making it the most expensive entertainment venue built in the Las Vegas Valley.

Sphere opened on September 29, 2023, with Irish rock band U2 beginning a 40-show residency called U2:UV Achtung Baby Live at Sphere. Director Darren Aronofsky's docu-film Postcard from Earth opened on October 6, 2023. Since its opening, the venue has also hosted residencies of various lengths for Kenny Chesney, the Eagles, Dead & Company, Phish, the Backstreet Boys, No Doubt, and Metallica. Sphere has recently begun screening an immersive 4D version of the 1939 film The Wizard of Oz. The venue is owned by Sphere Entertainment, a spin-off of MSG Company.

== History ==
=== Background ===
The project, known then as the MSG Sphere, was announced in February 2018. The project was initially a partnership between the Madison Square Garden Company (MSG) and Las Vegas Sands Corporation. Sphere is just off the Las Vegas Strip and east of the Venetian resort, which was opened by Las Vegas Sands in 1999. Las Vegas Sands contributed the 18-acre (7.3 ha) site for the project. Apollo Global Management purchased the Venetian in 2022 and became MSG's new partner on the Sphere project, replacing Las Vegas Sands. As part of the sale, the land beneath the Venetian Resort and Sphere was purchased by Vici Properties.

The sphere-shaped project was designed by Populous, with an interior that includes the world's largest LED screen. The acoustics for the venue were designed by Arup. MSG initially estimated the project cost at $1.2 billion. In February 2020, the company said the cost had increased to $1.66 billion as a result of design changes consisting of guest enhancements. The cost continued to increase, eventually surpassing $2 billion due to the 2021–2023 global supply chain crisis and the 2021–2022 inflation surge. With a final expected cost of $2.3 billion, it is the most expensive entertainment venue in Las Vegas history, beating out the $1.9 billion Allegiant Stadium.

=== Construction ===
A groundbreaking ceremony was held on September 27, 2018, and was attended by approximately 300 people, including Las Vegas Sands' Sheldon Adelson and Nevada governor Brian Sandoval. In November 2018, it was reported that the MSG Sphere would be built along with new bars, private suites, a museum and retail space. AECOM began working on the site in February 2019, through a preliminary agreement. AECOM had worked on several other stadiums, including the T-Mobile Arena in Las Vegas. Excavation was underway in March 2019. Approximately 110,000 cubic yards (84,000 m^{3}) of dirt and caliche were excavated to prepare the site for construction. AECOM was named as the general contractor in June 2019. The project had 400 construction workers. This number was expected to eventually reach a peak of 1,500. Construction of the basement was underway in July 2019.

By October 2019, construction crews had completed the 80,000 sq ft (7,400 m^{2}) basement as well as the first ground level of the venue. The basement area will be used as public space for events. Excavation went as deep as 21 feet (6.4 m) for construction of the basement. In December 2019, the spherical structure reached 65 feet (20 m) in height with the completion of a fourth level, out of eight above-ground floors.

In February 2020, the world's fourth-largest crane, a Demag CC-8800 crawler crane, was set up on the site's northeast side for the purpose of lifting heavy construction materials. The crane is capable of standing up to 580 feet (180 m). In a disassembled state, the crane was transported across the Atlantic Ocean from Zeebrugge, Belgium to Port Hueneme, California. The crane then required 120 tractor-trailers to transport it to Las Vegas. A separate crane was required to assemble the main crane, a process which took 18 days. In March 2020, construction reached the widest point of the spherical structure, the 516-foot (157 m) diameter, located at the sixth level and 108 feet (33 m) above ground.

The project had been scheduled to open in 2021. However, MSG announced on March 31, 2020, that construction would be suspended due to the COVID-19 pandemic. The project subsequently experienced a disruption in its supply chain, and this hindered construction progress. All construction work on the project was expected to come to a stop over the two weeks following the announcement. In August 2020, MSG Entertainment announced that construction had resumed on the project, with the opening rescheduled for 2023. Over the subsequent 15 months, construction would be focused on concrete, followed by steel erection and then the 13,000-ton steel-domed roof, the most complex part of the project. In October 2020, crews completed the heaviest lift up to that point, with the installation of two 240-ton steel girders.

MSG took over as general contractor in December 2020, although AECOM continued to provide support. A 170-ton steel compression ring was added in February 2021, marking the heaviest lift of the entire project. Due to its size, the ring had to be assembled at the construction site. Work crews spent three weeks welding and bolting the prefabricated steel pieces together, and the crane was then used to lift the ring into place.

==== Roof, exosphere, and interior ====
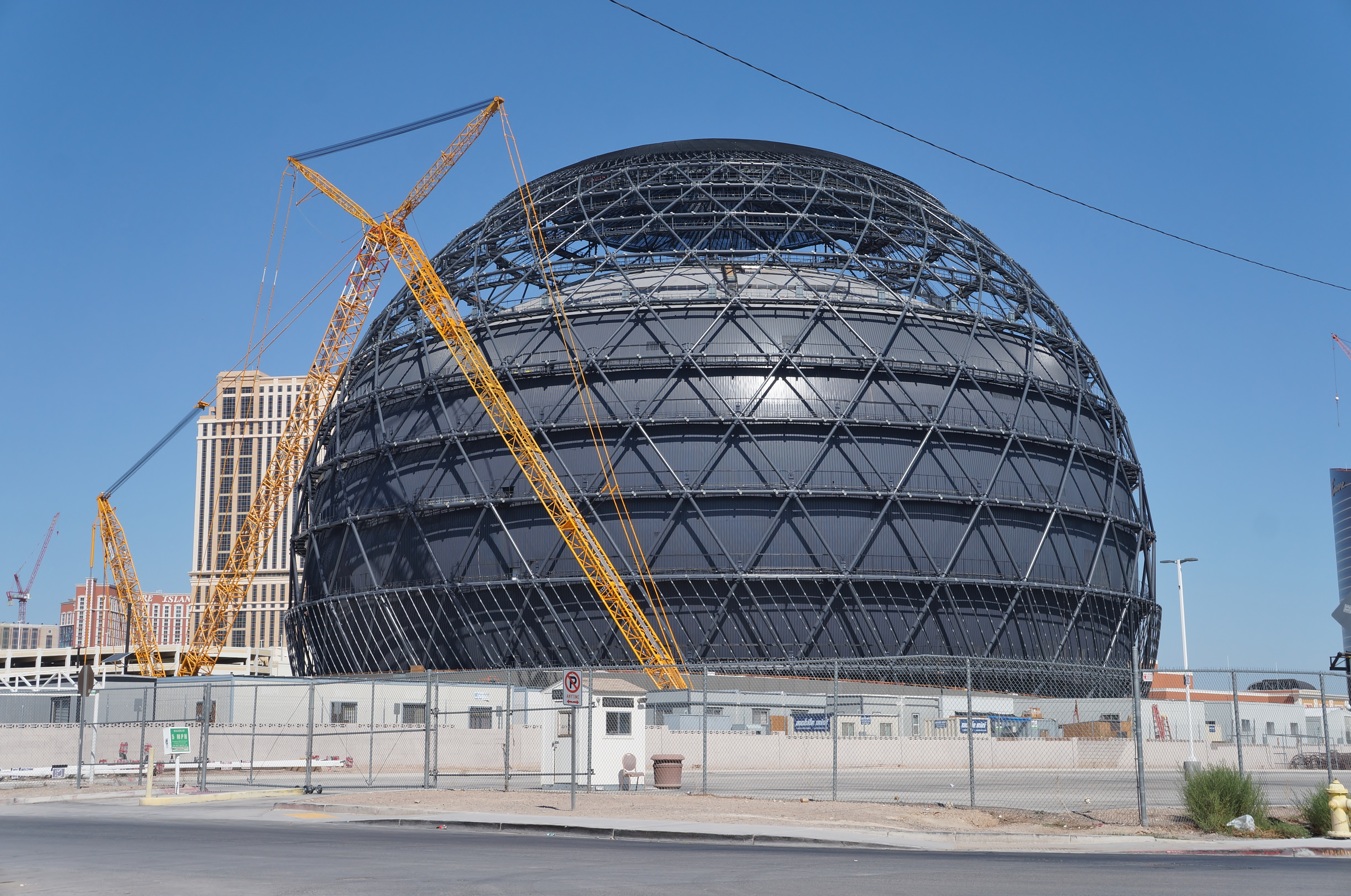
Construction of the exosphere in September 2022

The dome's roof required 3,000 tons of steel. The roof started to take shape in March 2021, as crews began the installation of 32 trusses, each one weighing 100 tons. Truss installation reached the midway point in May 2021, and the crane had to be moved to the southern side of the property to install the remainder. Because of its size, the crane's relocation took two days.

The dome was topped off on June 18, 2021, and work was already underway on an external exosphere which would be built around the dome. The exosphere is made of LED light panels which are visible from several miles away and is 30 percent taller than the dome. Work on Sphere's interior began in August 2021.

Upon completion of the roof's steel frame, 6,000 cubic yards (4,600 m^{3}) of concrete were then pumped onto the roof. This formed a layer measuring 10 inches (250 mm) in thickness, and weighing approximately 10,000 tons. The roof was finished in October 2021. Crews then turned their focus to the 730-ton steel interior frame which supports the LED screens and audio system. Work on the interior frame continued into 2022.

A second topping out, for the exosphere, took place on May 24, 2022. This was followed by installation of the interior and exterior LED screens. The latter was illuminated for the first time on July 4, 2023, during Independence Day celebrations. Sphere soon went viral for its display of images.

=== Opening ===
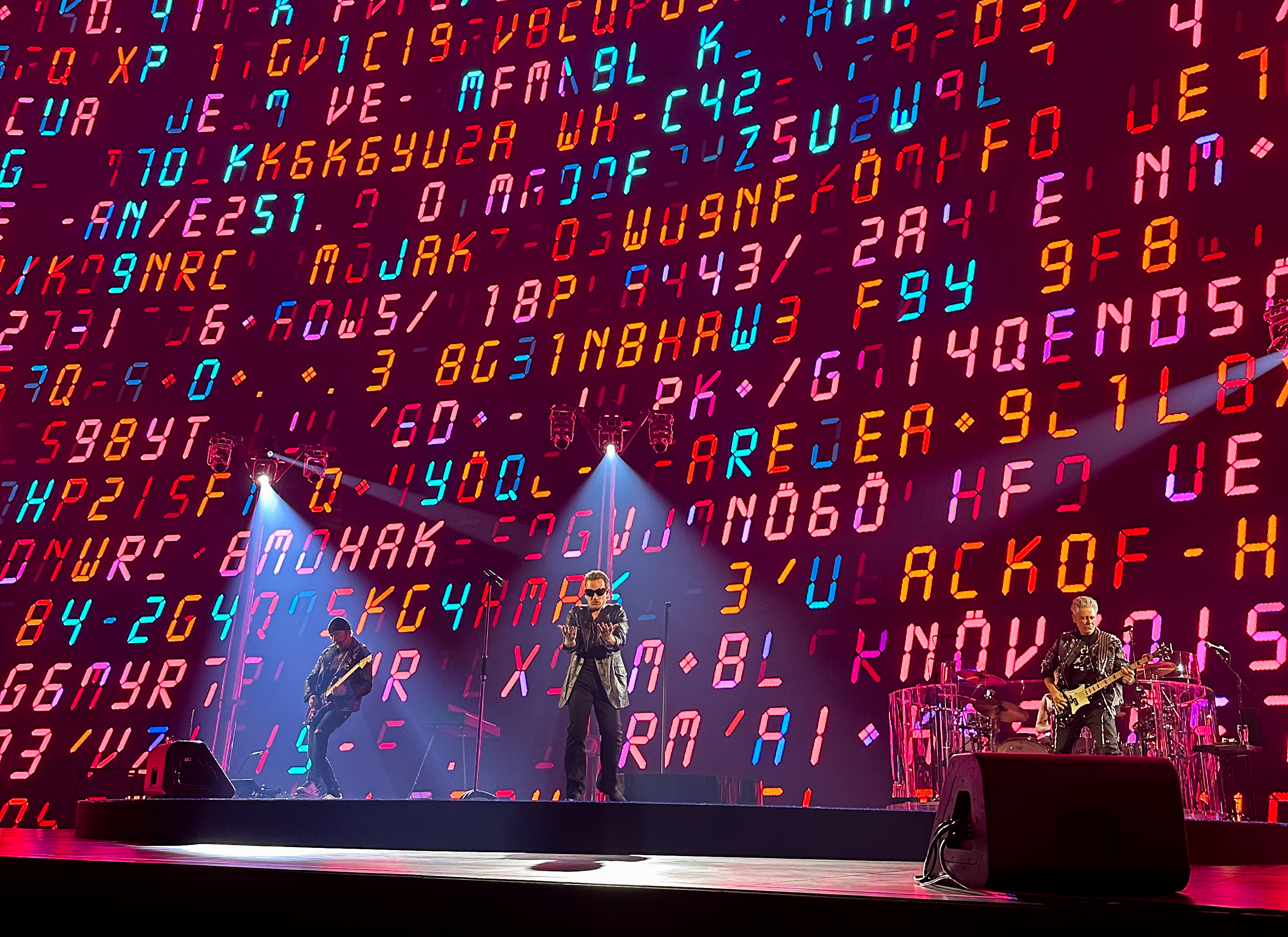
U2 performing on September 29, 2023, Sphere's opening night

On April 20, 2023, the venue's owner Madison Square Garden Entertainment (which had, in turn, been spun off from the Madison Square Garden Company in 2020 in order to focus on its professional sports assets) spun off its "traditional" live events business under the Madison Square Garden Entertainment name in order to insulate them, retaining Sphere and its regional sports network businesses under the new name Sphere Entertainment. The MSG name was subsequently removed from the venue, which was officially renamed "Sphere".

Sphere opened on September 29, 2023, with the opening of U2's concert residency U2:UV Achtung Baby Live at Sphere. It marked the group's first live show since 2019. Sphere plans on hosting four to six residencies each year. The company also debuted its first feature film, Postcard from Earth by director Darren Aronofsky, at Sphere on October 6, 2023. The venue will employ up to 3,000 people. Since opening, Sphere operated at a $98.4 million loss at the end of the third fiscal quarter of 2023. In 2024, Sphere grossed $420.5 million from 1.3 million concert tickets sold, ranking as the top-grossing venue of any size that year; it is the highest annual gross of any venue in Billboard Boxscore history.

== Features ==
=== Structure and seating ===
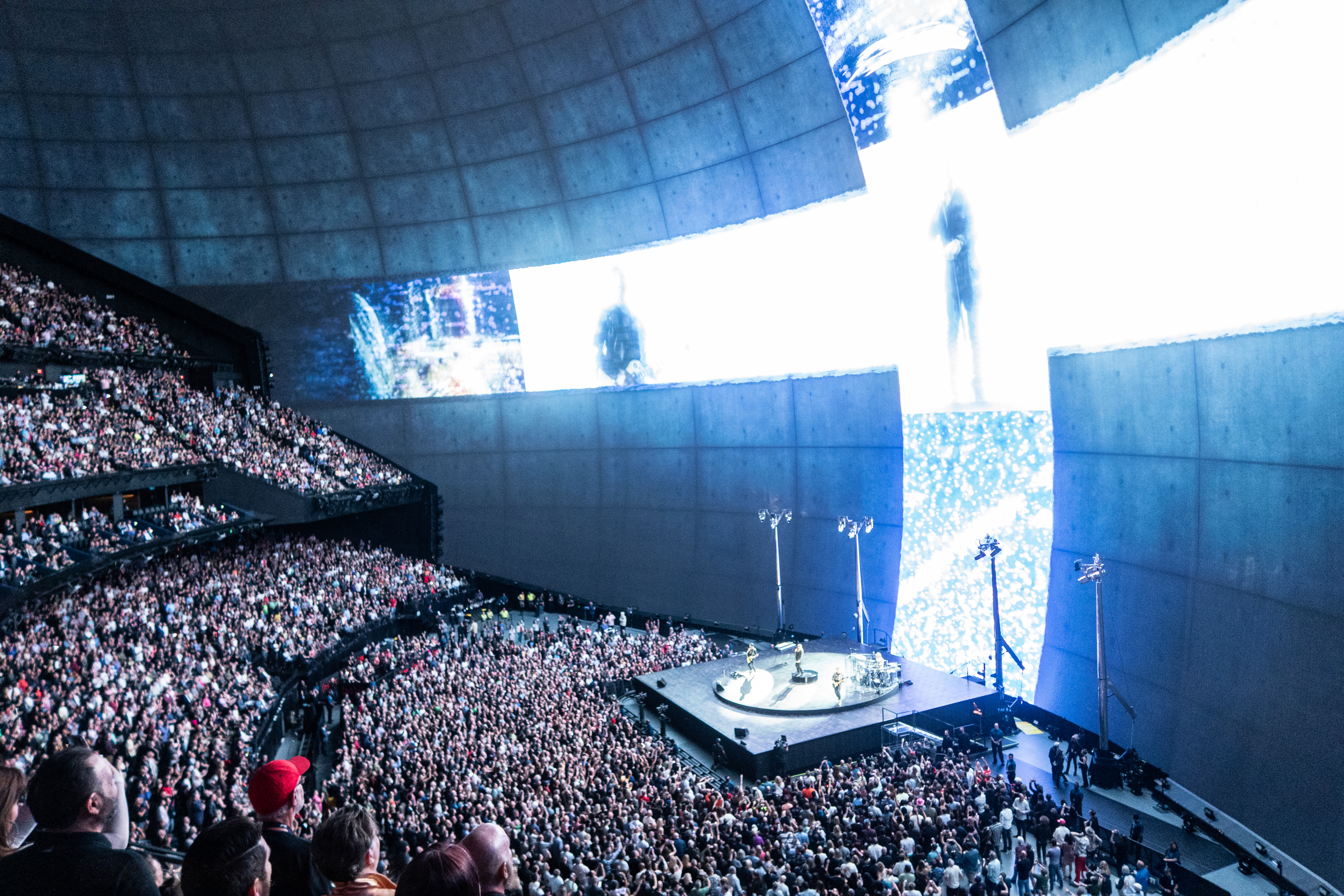
The seating levels of Sphere during a U2 concert

Sphere is 366 feet (112 m) high and 516 feet (157 m) wide at its broadest point. It is the largest spherical building in the world at 875,000 sq ft (81,300 m^{2}). It includes seating for 17,600 people, and all seats have high-speed internet access. The venue can accommodate 20,000 people in standing capacity. Seating does not wrap around the entire sphere, instead covering approximately two-thirds of the interior while the stage takes up the remainder. Approximately 800 seats in the venue's premium, lower-level 100 section have obstructed views of the wraparound video screen due to the overhang of the second level. Sphere has nine levels, including the basement, where a VIP club is located. A total of 23 suites are included, across the third and fifth floors.

The arena primarily hosts award shows and concerts, in addition to other entertainment events. Though not designed to fit a traditional arena layout for sports such as basketball and ice hockey, it can host ring sports events such as boxing and mixed martial arts, as well as esports tournaments.

=== Video screens ===
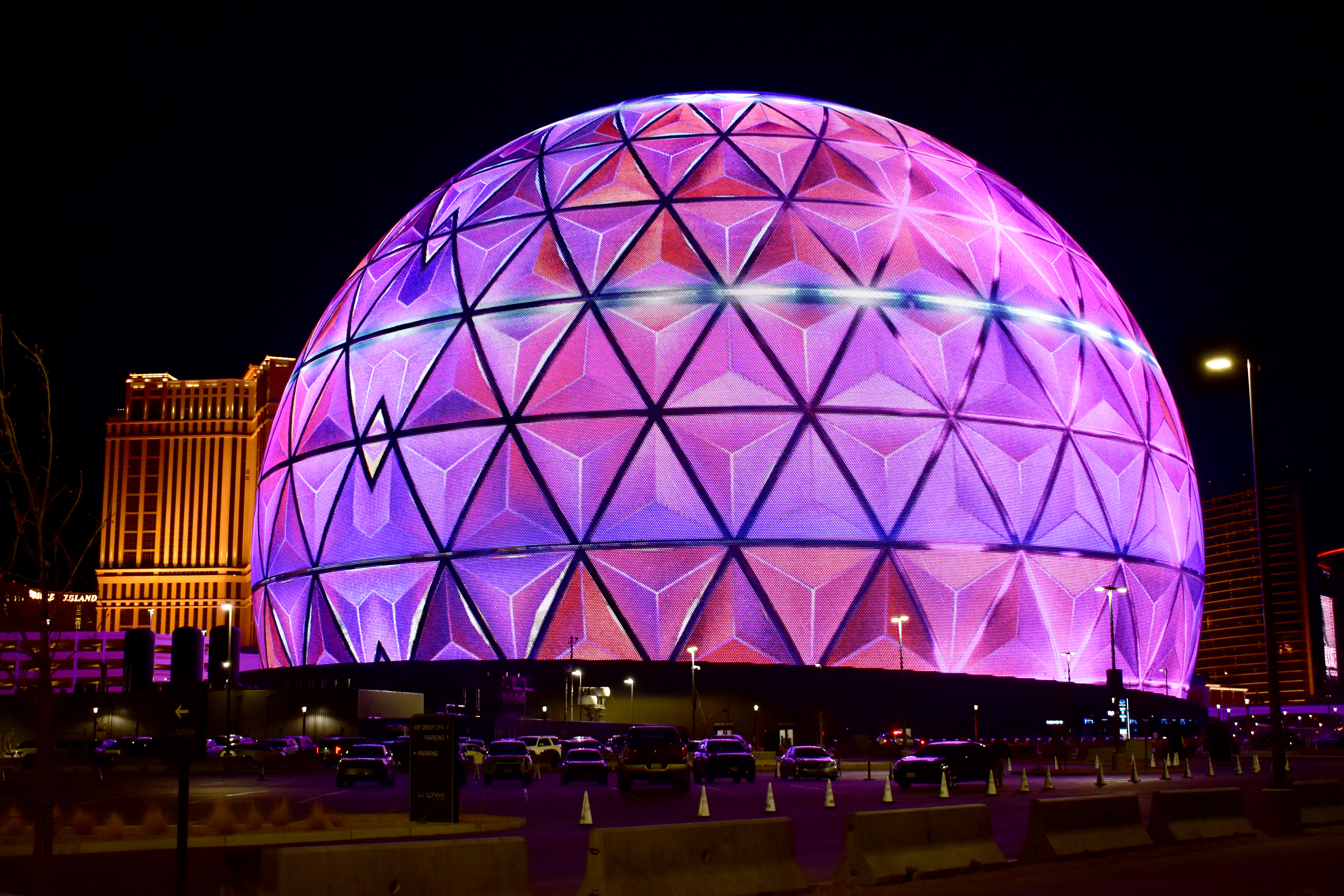
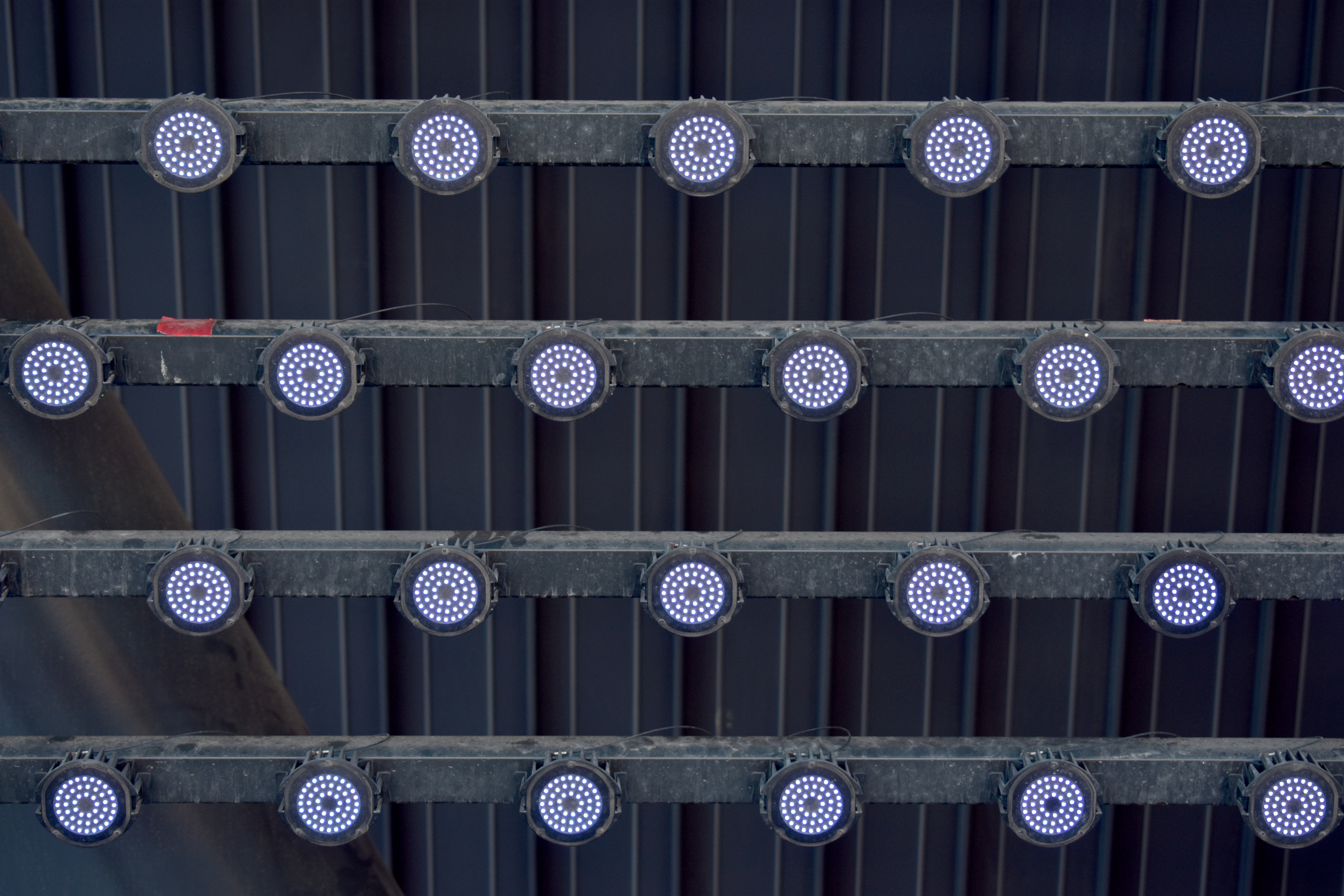
The venue's exosphere is lit by approximately 1.23 million LED pucks, each with 48 diodes.

The venue is equipped with a 160,000-square-foot (15,000 m^{2}) LED screen that wraps around the interior. It was designed and manufactured by SACO Technologies, a Canadian company based in Montreal specializing in LED video displays and lighting. With a 16,000 × 16,000 resolution, it is the highest-resolution LED screen in the world, according to Sphere Entertainment. In describing the number of pixels on screen, media sources have reported figures ranging from 189 to 254 million diodes to 268,435,456 pixels. The screen consists of 64,000 LED panels, each controlled by a printed circuit board housed in an aluminum frame, with the panels manufactured in 780 different geometric shapes with an edge-to-edge tolerance of 0.8 millimetres (0.031 in). Due to its curved shape and the propensity for pixels to disappear near the poles, the screen uses an adaptive pixel pitch. It was also designed to be acoustically transparent, allowing sound from the speakers mounted behind the screen to pass through.

The building's exosphere features a 580,000-square-foot (54,000 m^{2}) LED display also designed by SACO Technologies; it was the world's largest at the time the venue opened. It comprises 1.23 million puck-shaped LEDs spaced 8 inches (20 cm) apart, each containing 48 diodes. Visuals displayed on the exosphere have included a Halloween jack-o'-lantern, a Christmas snow globe, advertisements, digital art displays, and an emoji named Orbi.

The internal and external displays of Sphere are powered by 150 RTX A6000 graphics processing units by Nvidia, each featuring more than 10,752 cores and 48 gigabytes of memory. Media is streamed from external sources via Nvidia BlueField data processing units and ConnectX-6 DX network interface controllers using Nvidia's Rivermax media streaming software.

=== Sound system ===
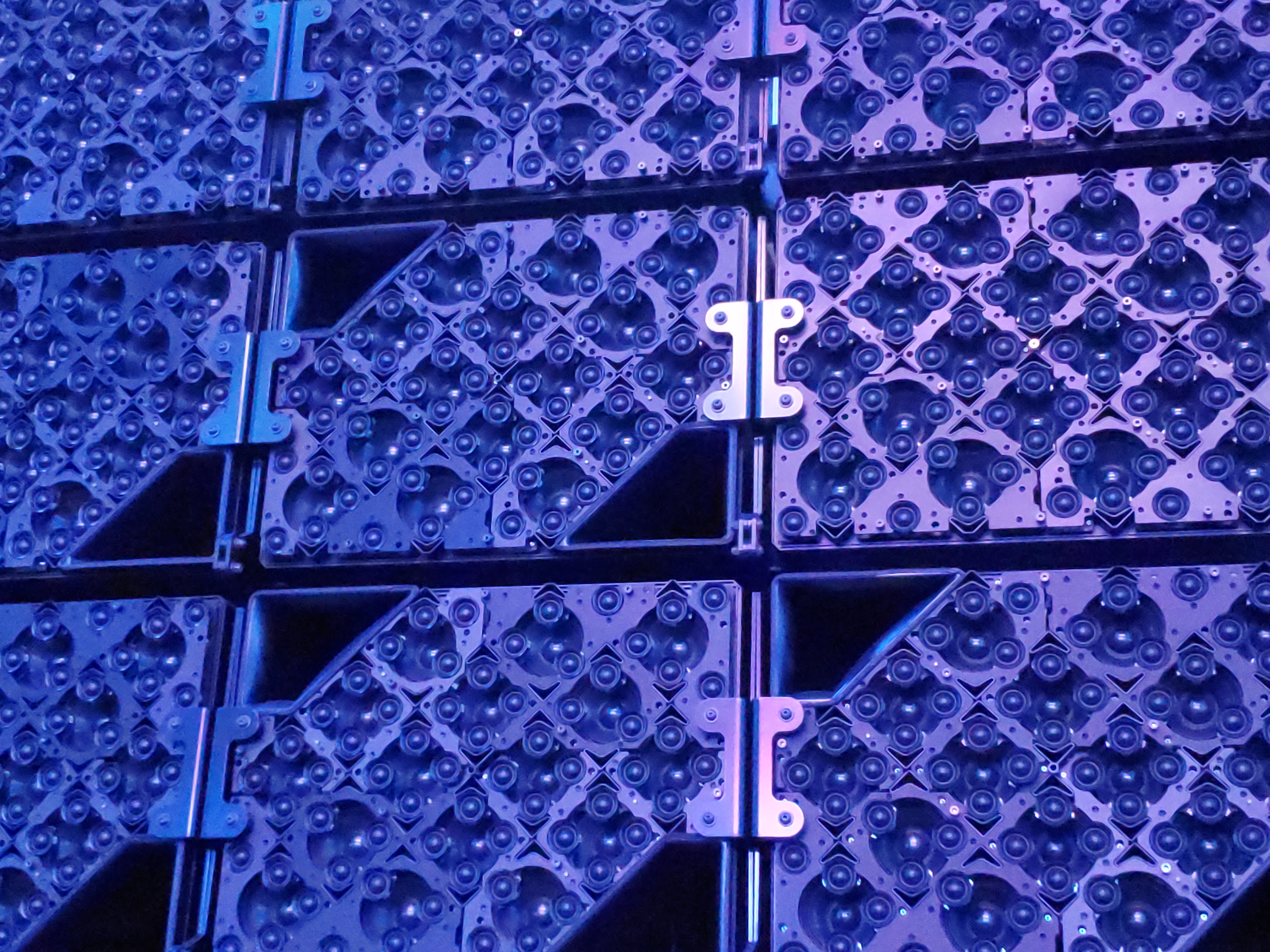
The venue's speaker system is based on HOLOPLOT's X1 Matrix Array.

Sphere's sound system, dubbed "Sphere Immersive Sound", features spatial audio capabilities and is based on HOLOPLOT's X1 Matrix Array of speakers. The sound system comprises 1,586 permanently installed speakers and 300 mobile modules, with 99 percent of the system being hidden behind the LED screen. Each X1 array comprises a MD96 and a MD80-S sound module, equipped with 96 and 80 drivers respectively. Through a matrix of drivers within each speaker module and a matrix of modules per array, HOLOPLOT's system offers more control over the dispersion of sound in horizontal and vertical directions.

In total, the sound system comprises 167,000 speaker drivers, amplifiers, and processing channels, and it weighs 395,120 pounds (179,220 kg). The main coverage of the sound system is provided by the "proscenium array", located in Sphere where a traditional theatre proscenium would be built. It comprises 464 HOLOPLOT X1 speakers (272 MD96 modules and 192 MD80-S modules) organized into 14 clusters and arranged in a semi-arch about 25–30 feet (7.6–9.1 m) above the stage, making it the world's largest loudspeaker array. Elsewhere, the sound system has 28 environmental arrays for immersive coverage (each one comprising five MD96 and five MD80-S modules), 6 effects arrays (each one comprising 24 MD96 modules), 71 surround arrays behind the audience, 12 delay arrays under the main balcony, 10 side-fill arrays, and 6 low-fill arrays. The sound system also can deliver sound through the floorboards.

Using beamforming capabilities, the HOLOPLOT X1 speakers can digitally aim sound at specific spots in the audience and deliver a consistent volume to every seat in the venue, even over long distances; in Sphere, the system offers 110 metres (360 ft) of sound coverage to reach the furthest seats. The HOLOPLOT X1 arrays can also use wave field synthesis to create a virtual point of origin for sound waves and to place them in precise spatial locations, regardless of the actual positions of speakers. Software algorithms compensate for any transmission loss caused by the obstruction from the LED screen. Integrated into the HOLOPLOT X1 modules are several technologies by Powersoft, including 16-channel amplification, Integrated Powered Adaptive Loudspeaker for subwoofers, and energy-efficient solutions such as pulse-width modulation and power factor correction.

=== Lighting ===
Sphere has approximately 150 in-house light fixtures, positioned mostly along the balcony rails and behind the LED screen.

=== 4D effects ===
Sphere contains 4D features, including scent and wind, along with haptic technology in 10,000 of the venue's seats.

=== Transportation ===
The property includes 304 parking spaces, while additional spaces will be available at the parking garages for the nearby Venetian, Palazzo, and Venetian Expo convention center. A 1,000-foot (300 m) pedestrian bridge connects Sphere to the expo, and there are plans to build a new Las Vegas Monorail station to serve Sphere and the Venetian. However, these plans were put on hold in April 2020, due to the financial impact of COVID-19 restrictions.

== Events ==
=== Concerts ===
List of concerts at Sphere
Date(s)	Performer(s)	Event/Tour	Shows
September 29, 2023 – March 2, 2024	U2 (Supporting act: Pauli "the PSM" Lovejoy)	U2:UV Achtung Baby Live at Sphere	40
April 18–21, 2024	Phish	Phish Live at Sphere	4
May 16, 2024 – May 17, 2025	Dead & Company	Dead Forever: Live at Sphere	48
September 20, 2024 – January 23, 2027	Eagles	Eagles: Live in Concert at Sphere	74
December 27, 2024 – March 2, 2025	Anyma	Afterlife presents Anyma: The End of Genesys	12
May 22, 2025 – July 11, 2026	Kenny Chesney	Kenny Chesney: Live at Sphere	25
July 11, 2025 – January 2, 2027	Backstreet Boys	Into the Millennium	53
August 29 – October 18, 2025	Chase & Status; Kaskade; Eli Brown; DJ Snake; Alan Walker; Sara Landry; Slander; Subtronics	Unity: Insomniac × Tomorrowland	9
December 5, 2025 – January 17, 2026	Zac Brown Band	Love & Fear	8
March 5 – July 4, 2026	Illenium	Odyssey	11
April 16 – May 2, 2026	Phish	Phish at Sphere	9
May 6 – June 13, 2026	No Doubt	Live at Sphere	18
September 4, 2026 – September 18, 2027	Carín León	De Sonora para el Mundo	10
October 1, 2026 – March 13, 2027	Metallica	Life Burns Faster	24
April 8 – June 12, 2027	John Mayer	Live at Sphere Las Vegas	21
May 21 – June 26, 2027	Rush	Elevate from the Norm	10
September 29, 2027 – January 29, 2028	Pink	Live at Sphere	18

=== Films ===
The film Postcard from Earth, directed by Darren Aronofsky, debuted on October 6, 2023. The show is preceded by the "Sphere Experience", a demonstration of the venue's capabilities that uses animatronic robots and holograms.

V-U2 An Immersive Concert Film, which documents U2's residency at Sphere, was released on September 5, 2024. It was directed by Morleigh Steinberg and her husband, U2 guitarist the Edge.

In April 2025, Sphere Entertainment announced that two new films would be released under the "Sphere Experience" program: The Wizard of Oz at Sphere, an immersive version of the 1939 film that began screening on August 28, 2025; and From the Edge, which will profile five extreme sports athletes and begin screening in 2026. In June 2026, it was announced that The Rocky Horror Picture Show (1975) was to premiere in the venue during 2027.

=== Sports ===
The 2024 NHL entry draft took place at Sphere from June 28–29, 2024. The first live sporting event at Sphere was held on September 14, 2024, with MMA promotion UFC hosting UFC 306: O'Malley vs. Dvalishvili (marketed as Riyadh Season Noche UFC for sponsorship reasons). Mexican-American filmmaker Carlos López Estrada oversaw the production of six vignettes played on the screens throughout the main card, which were themed on the history of Mexico. The screens then displayed immersive "scenes" as backdrops for each match. On February 23, 2026, it was reported that the Floyd Mayweather-Manny Pacquiao rematch would take place at the arena on September 19, 2026.

=== Keynotes and other events ===
- The first keynote event, held on June 18, 2024, as part of the HPE Discover 2024 conference, was given by Hewlett Packard Enterprise president and CEO Antonio Neri; he was joined by Nvidia CEO Jensen Huang.
- Delta Air Lines CEO Ed Bastian delivered a keynote during CES on January 7, 2025. The Keynote was followed by a performance by Lenny Kravitz.
- Gwen Stefani performed three private concerts as part of conference events on December 17, 2024, May 8, 2025 and January 6, 2026.
- Lenovo delivered a keynote on January 6, 2026 during the Consumer Electronics Show.
- On December 22, 2025, actor Timothée Chalamet filmed a video promotion for the film Marty Supreme atop the venue's exosphere.

== Other locations ==
MSG had initially stated that it intends to build other Sphere venues around the world.

A similar MSG Sphere was proposed to be built in Stratford, East London. However, in November 2023, Sphere's planning permission was rejected by Mayor of London Sadiq Khan, primarily over concerns about potential light pollution. The Tees Valley Mayor, Ben Houchen, suggested Teesside in North East England as an alternative location for Sphere.

In December 2023, Sphere Entertainment was discussing building of a new venue to be used for K-pop concerts in Hanam, South Korea. After discussions stalled for South Korea and also Saudi Arabia, MSG was in talks with developers in United Arab Emirates to build a second Sphere on Yas Island in Abu Dhabi. On October 15, 2024, Sphere Entertainment confirmed that a second Sphere, identical to the one in Las Vegas, would be built in Abu Dhabi.

In March 2025, CEO and executive chairman James Dolan stated that that the company was exploring the possibility of building smaller-scale iterations of Sphere, with a capacity of around 5,000 spectators. In January 2026, it was reported that Sphere Entertainment had proposed a smaller location in National Harbor, Maryland, adjacent to the MGM National Harbor casino hotel, which would seat around 6,000.

In April 2026, MSG Entertainment and SBI Holdings held talks about building a new venue in Tokyo, Japan at Odaiba which would have a capacity of 20,000 and feature a fully enclosed spherical structure.

== Sphere Studios ==
Sphere Studios, originally MSG Sphere Studios, opened in Burbank, California, in May 2022. The facility handles production and post-production work for the Las Vegas sphere and future spheres. MSG Sphere Studios sought to collaborate with filmmakers and musicians to create some of the content for the Las Vegas sphere. Ted King, who previously worked on Star Trek: The Experience, is among those who will create visual content for Sphere in Las Vegas. The studio will also produce content in association with the 2023 Las Vegas Grand Prix, which will travel past Sphere.

The spherical studio facility, nearly 100 feet (30 m) tall, is a miniature version of the Las Vegas sphere. The facility uses Big Sky, a specialized camera system created specifically to produce material for Sphere.

== Gallery ==
Exosphere

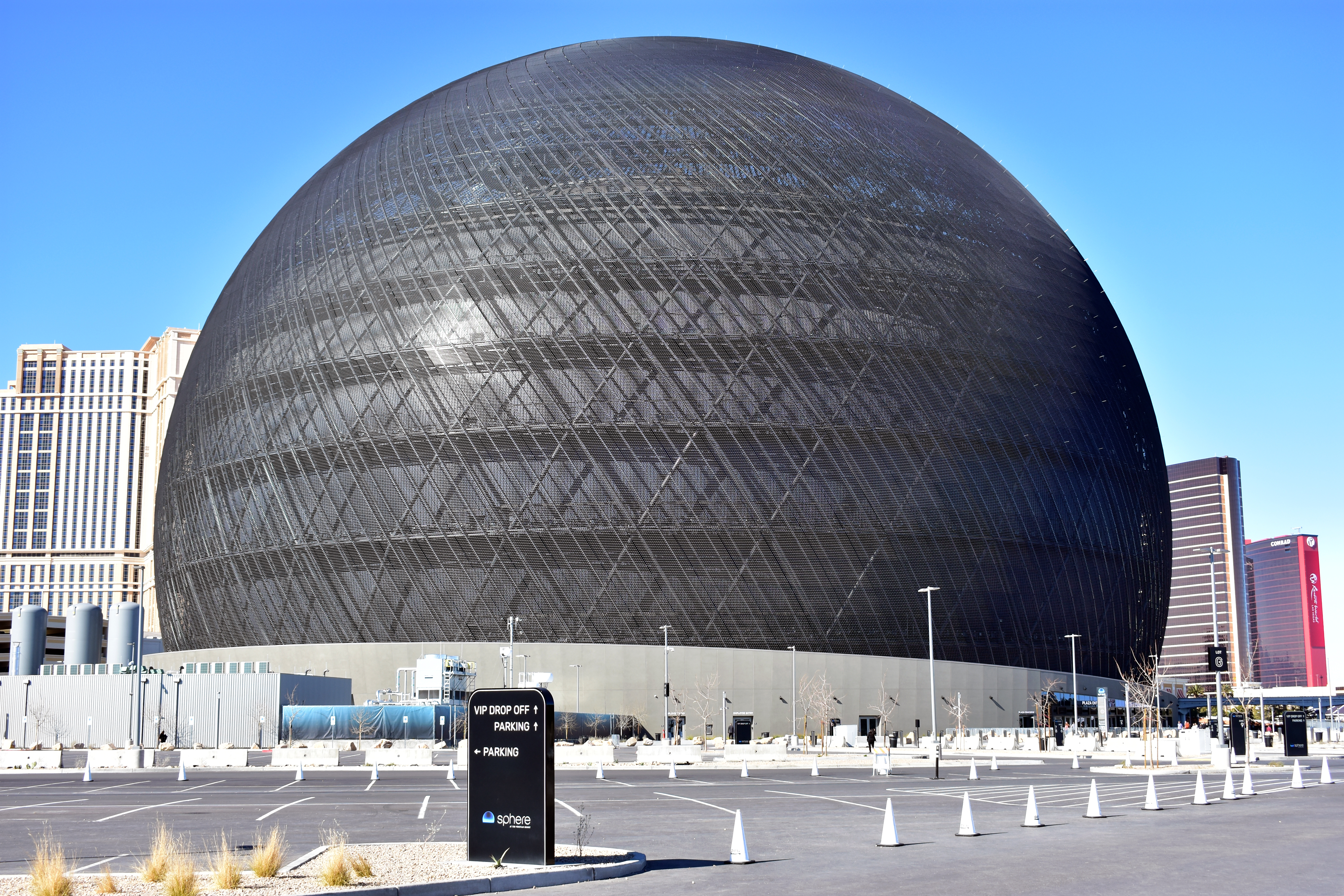
A daytime view of the exosphere in January 2024

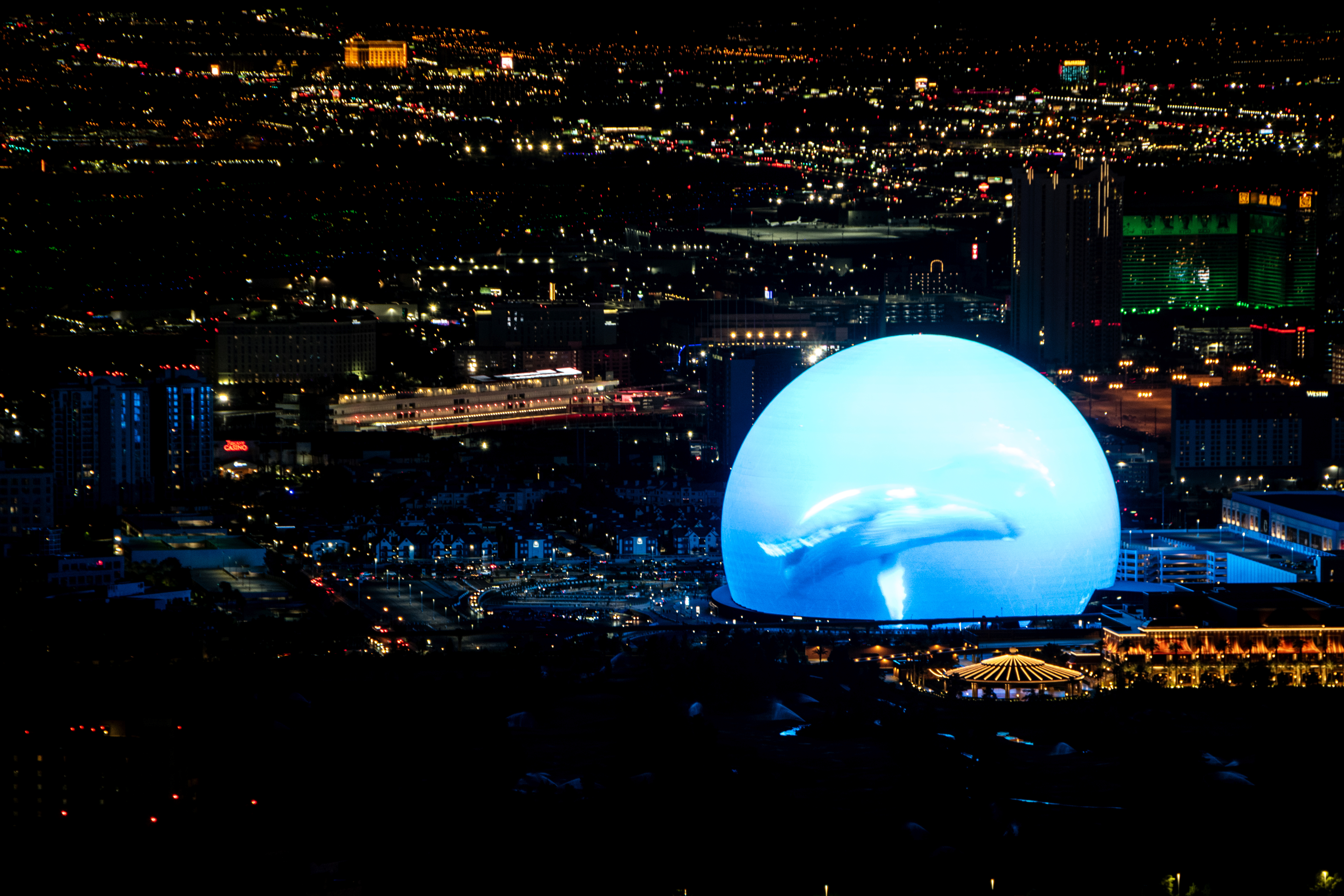
The exosphere as viewed from the Strat observation tower in July 2025

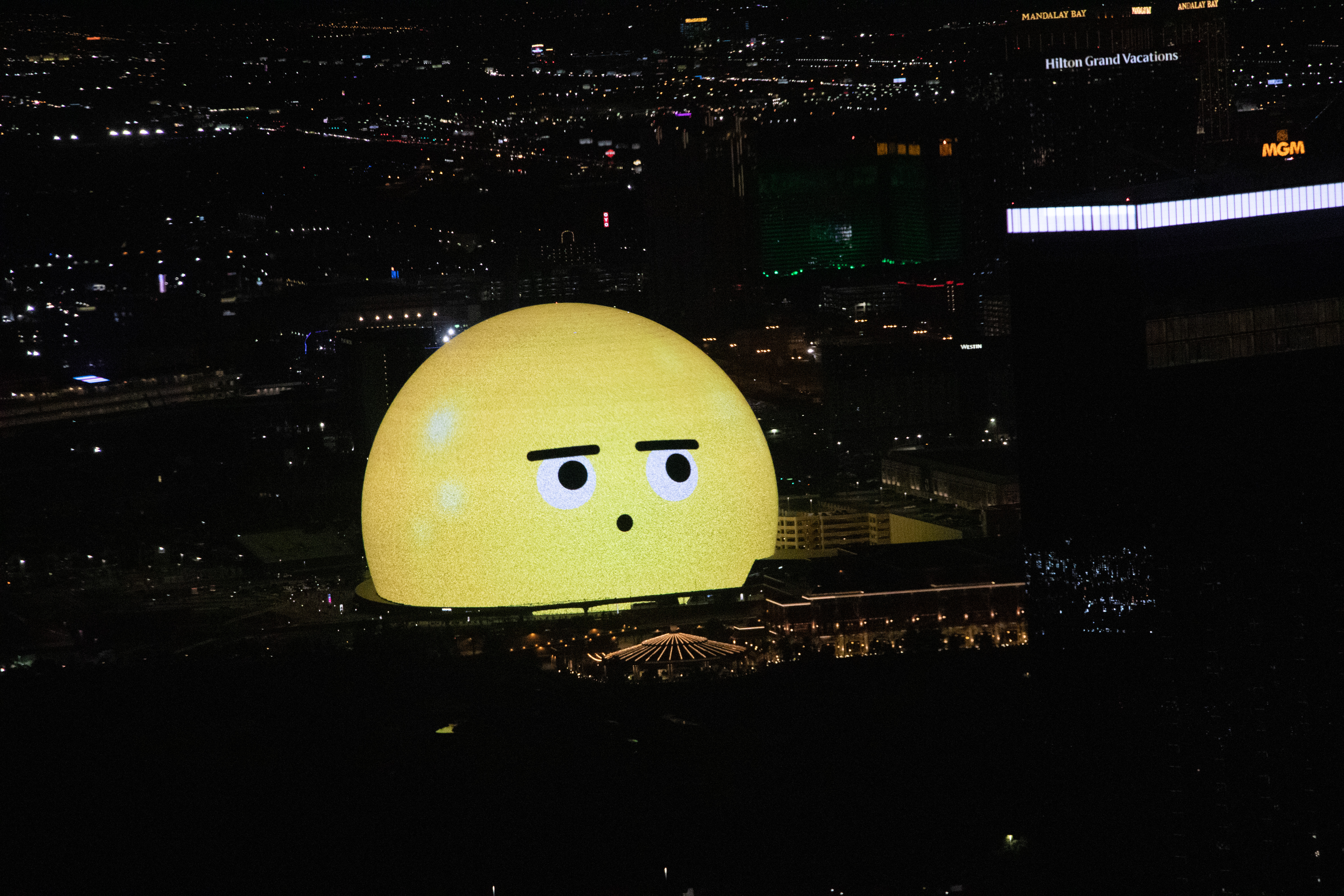
Orbi.

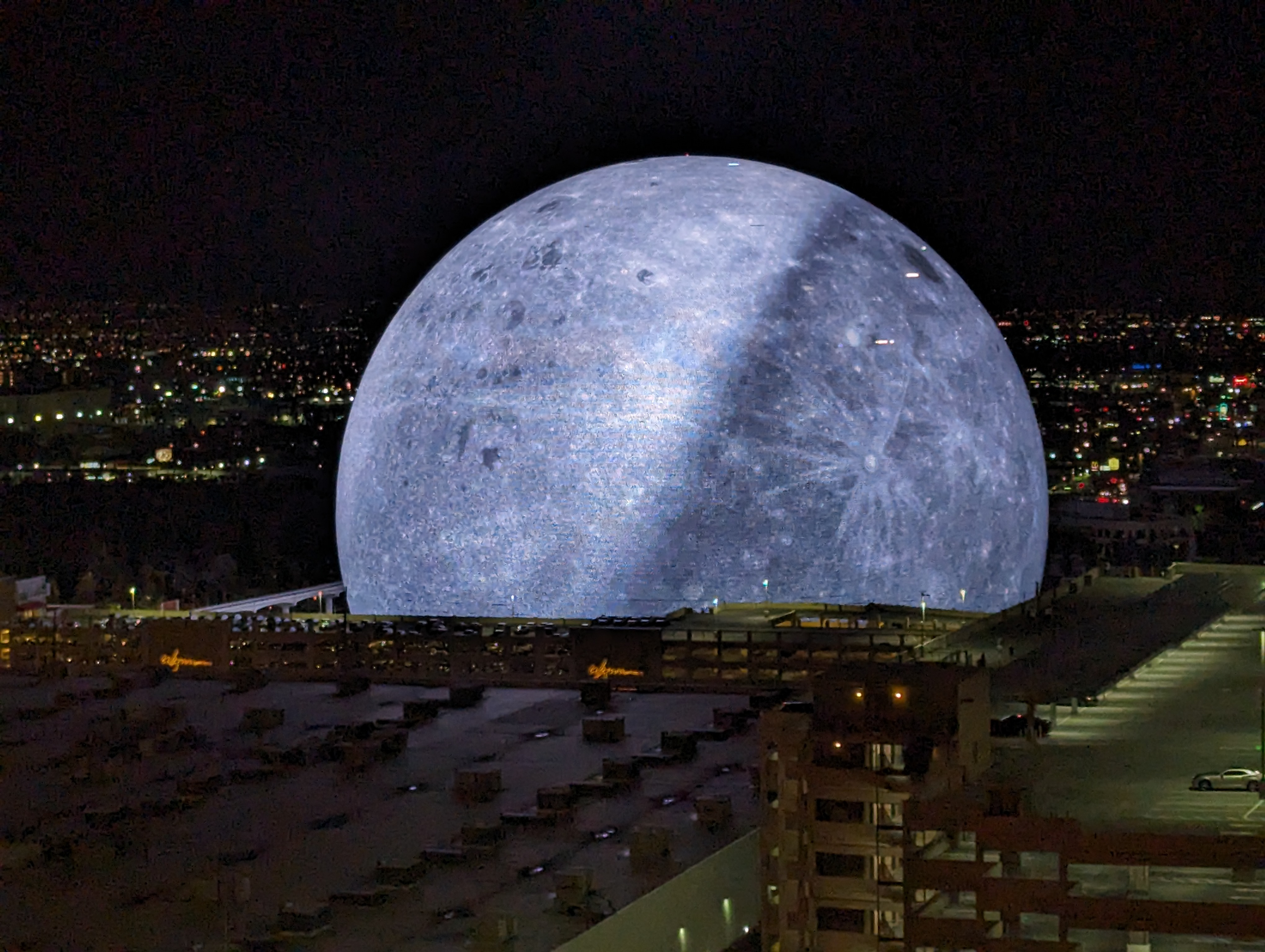

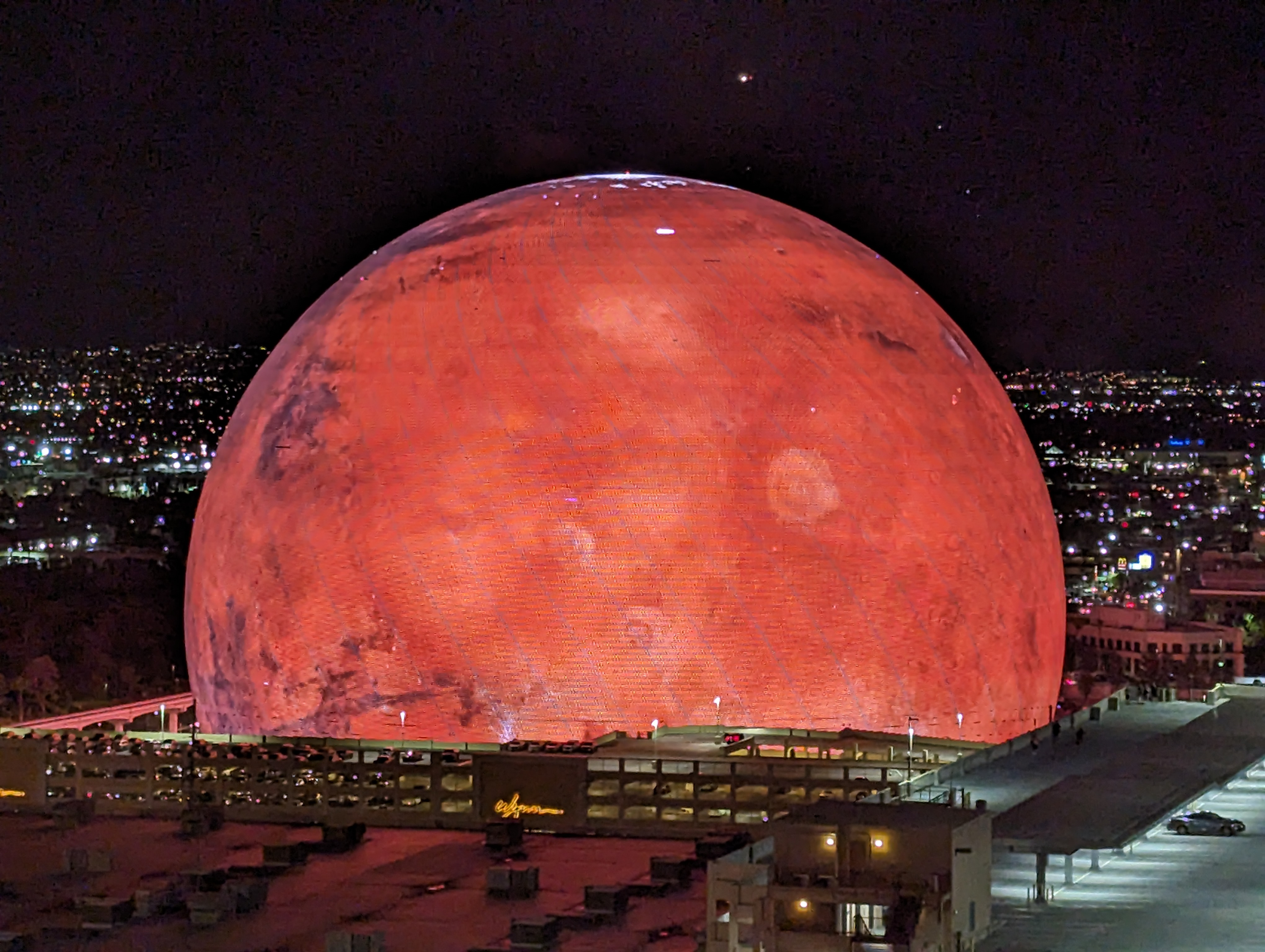

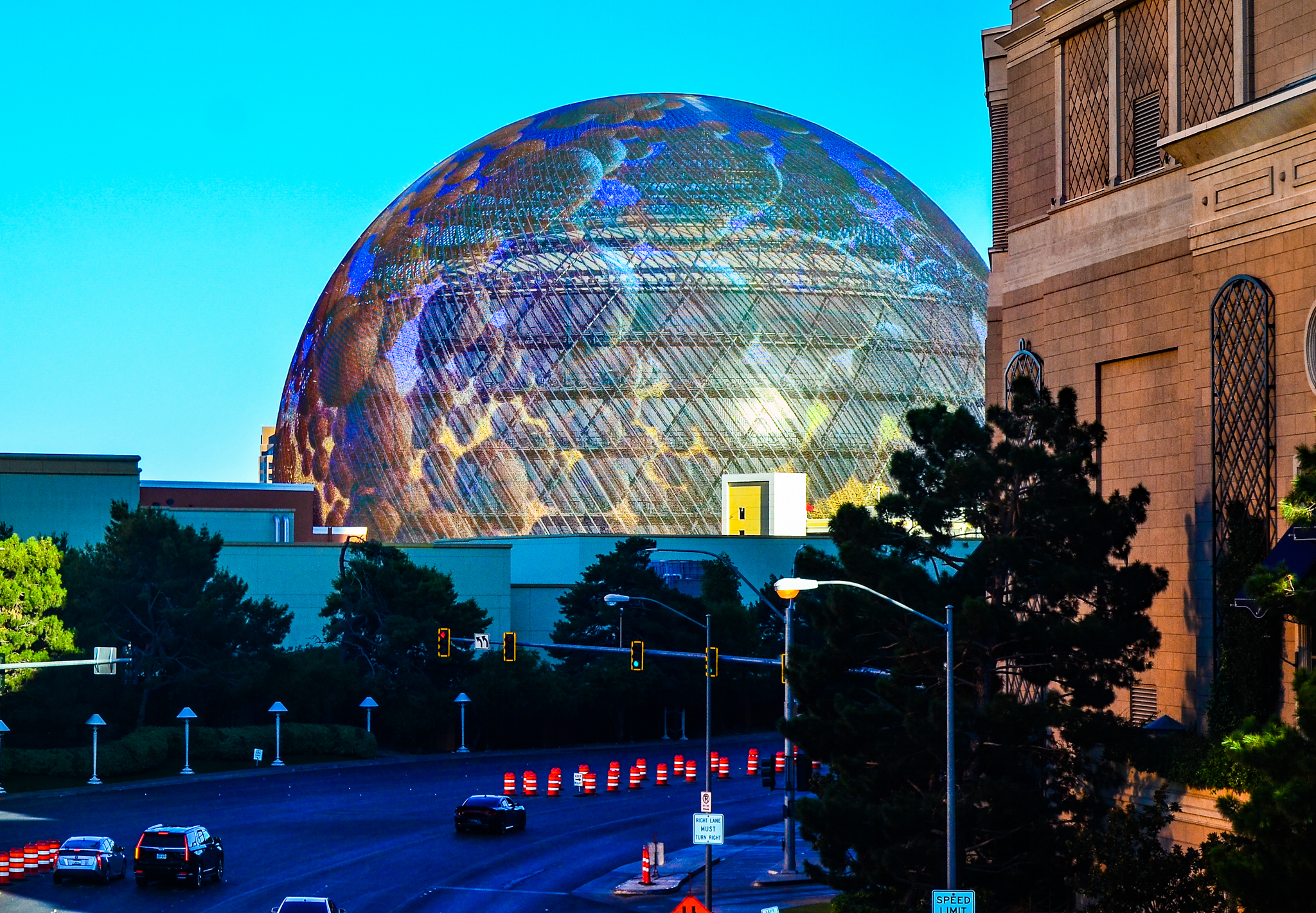

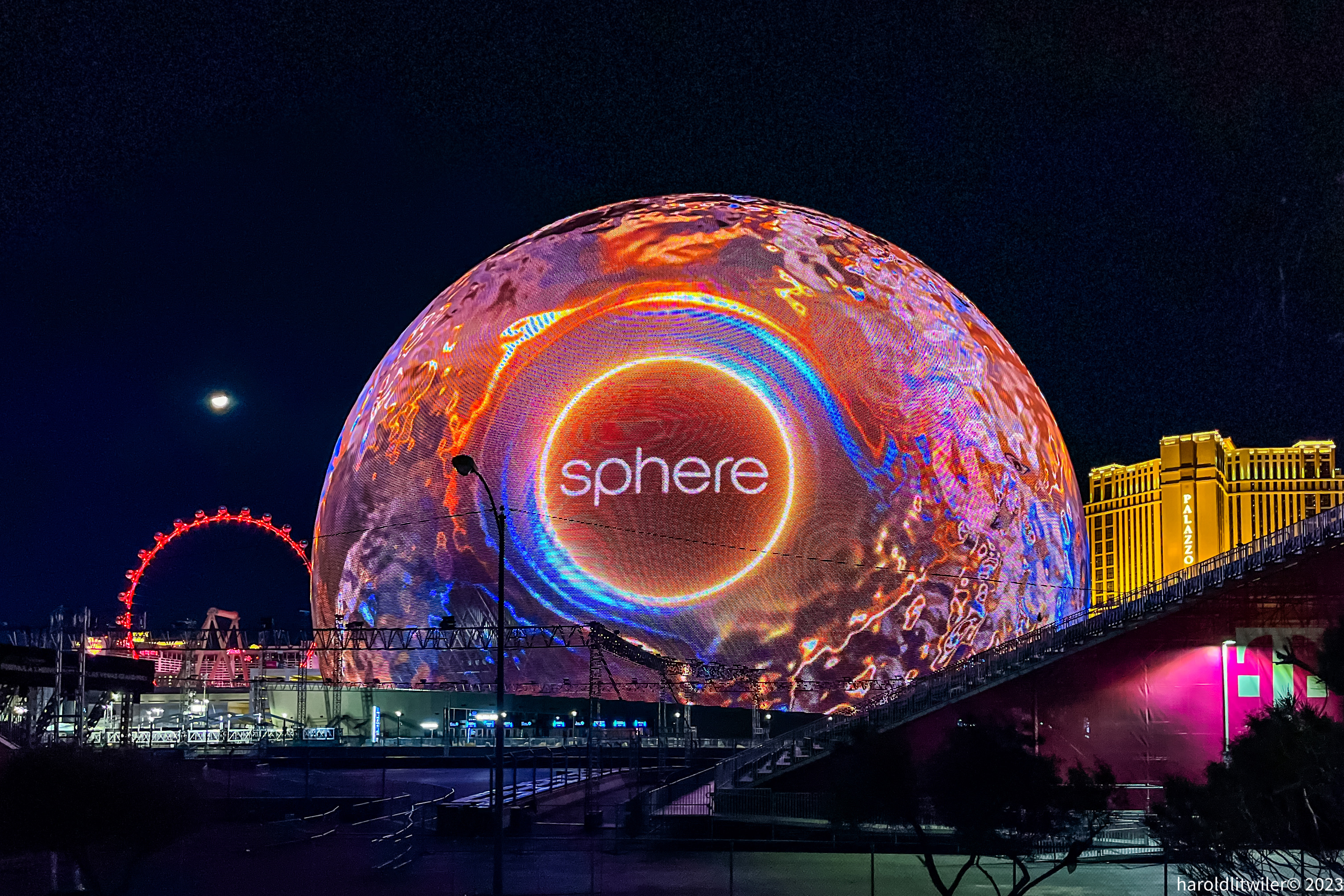

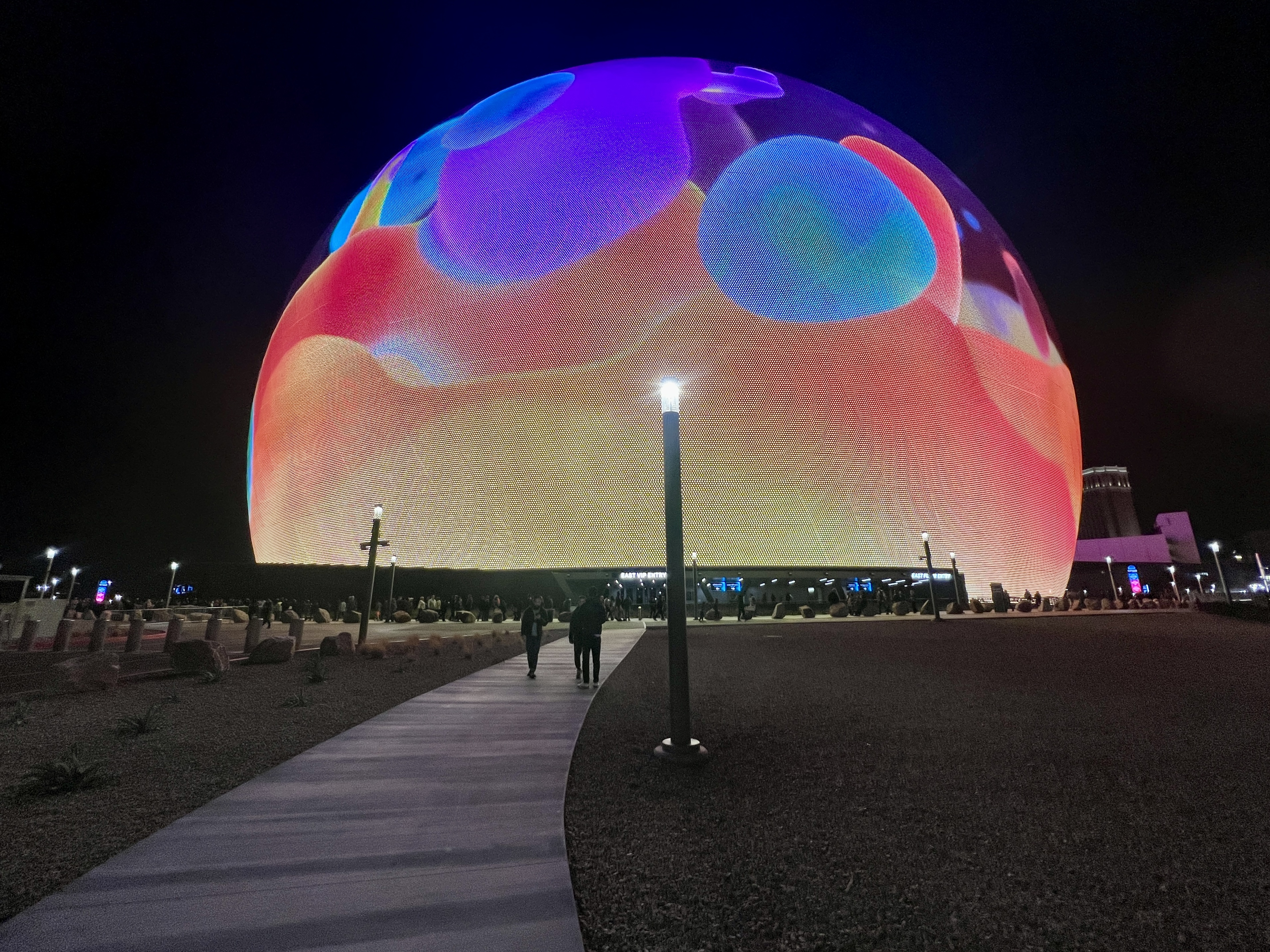

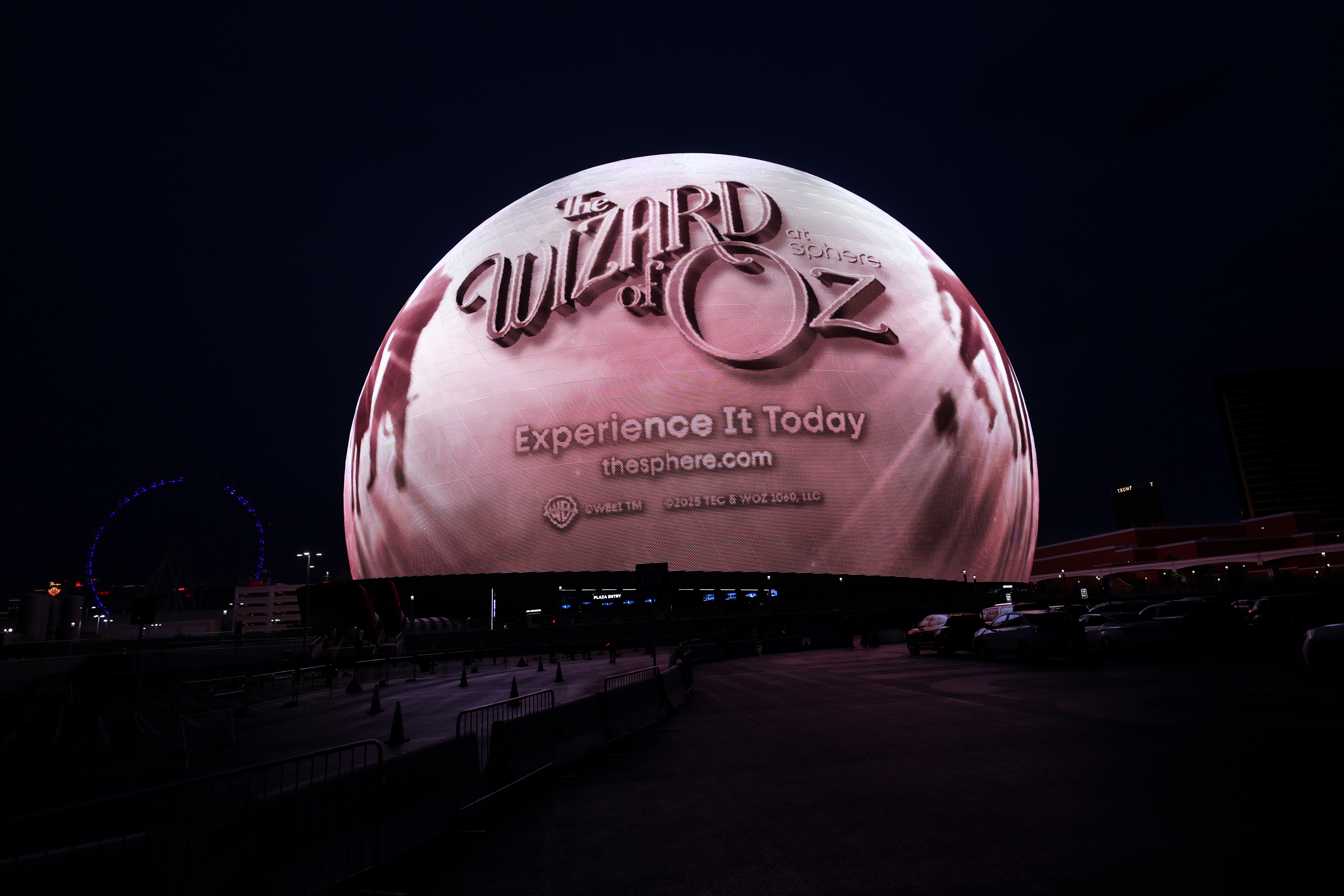

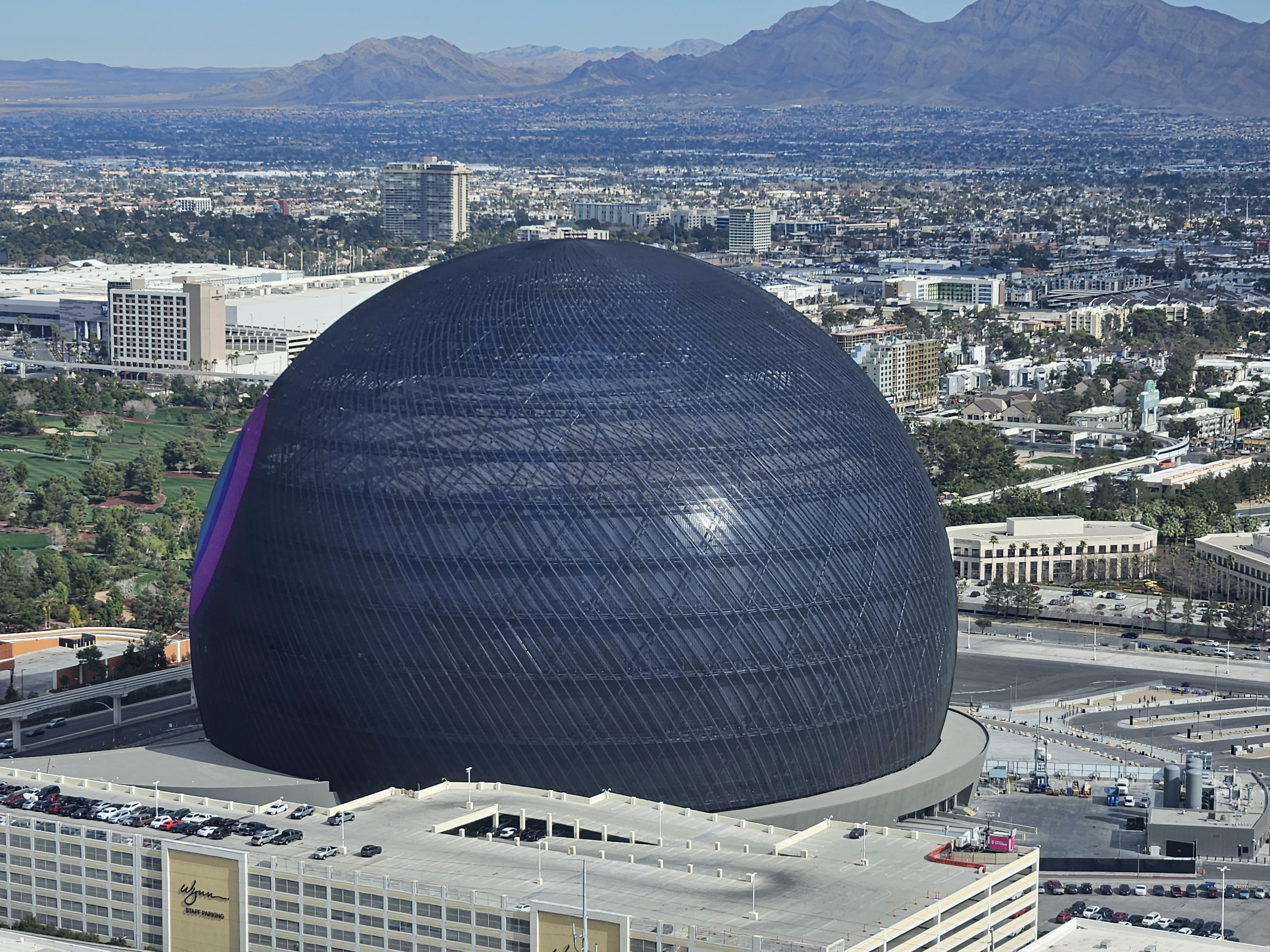

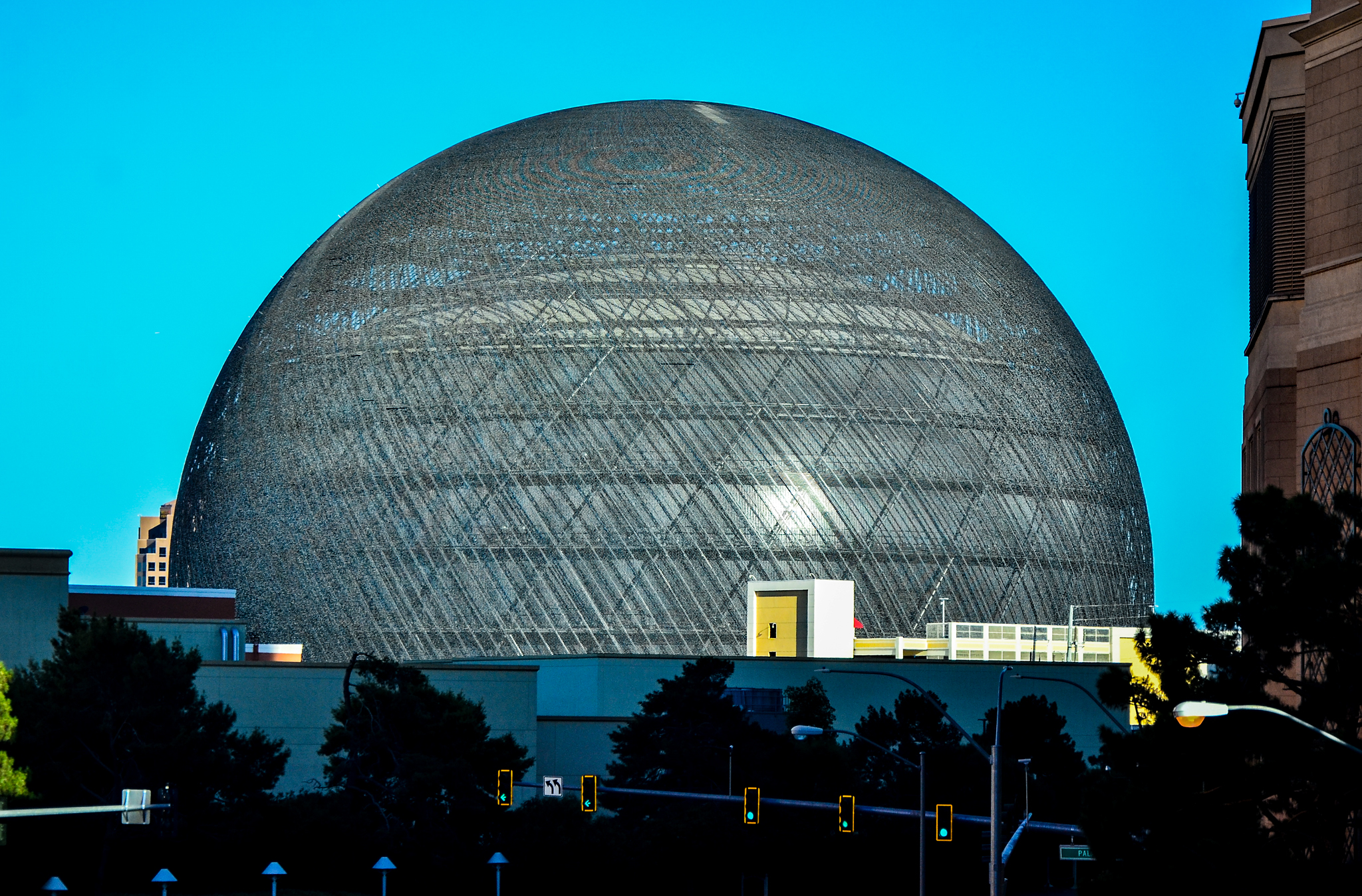

Lobby

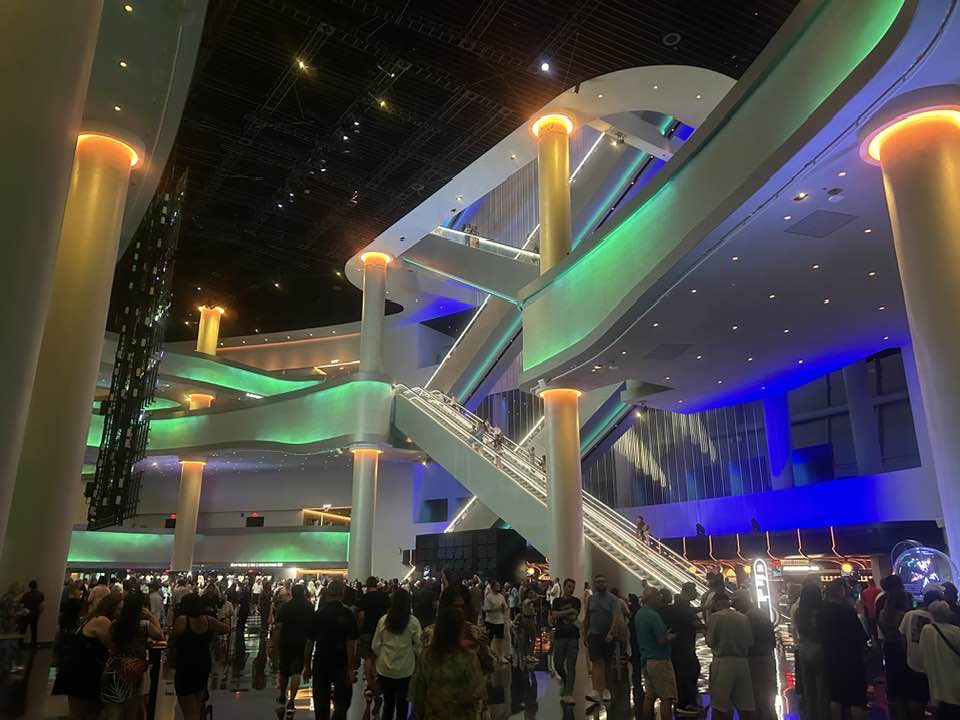

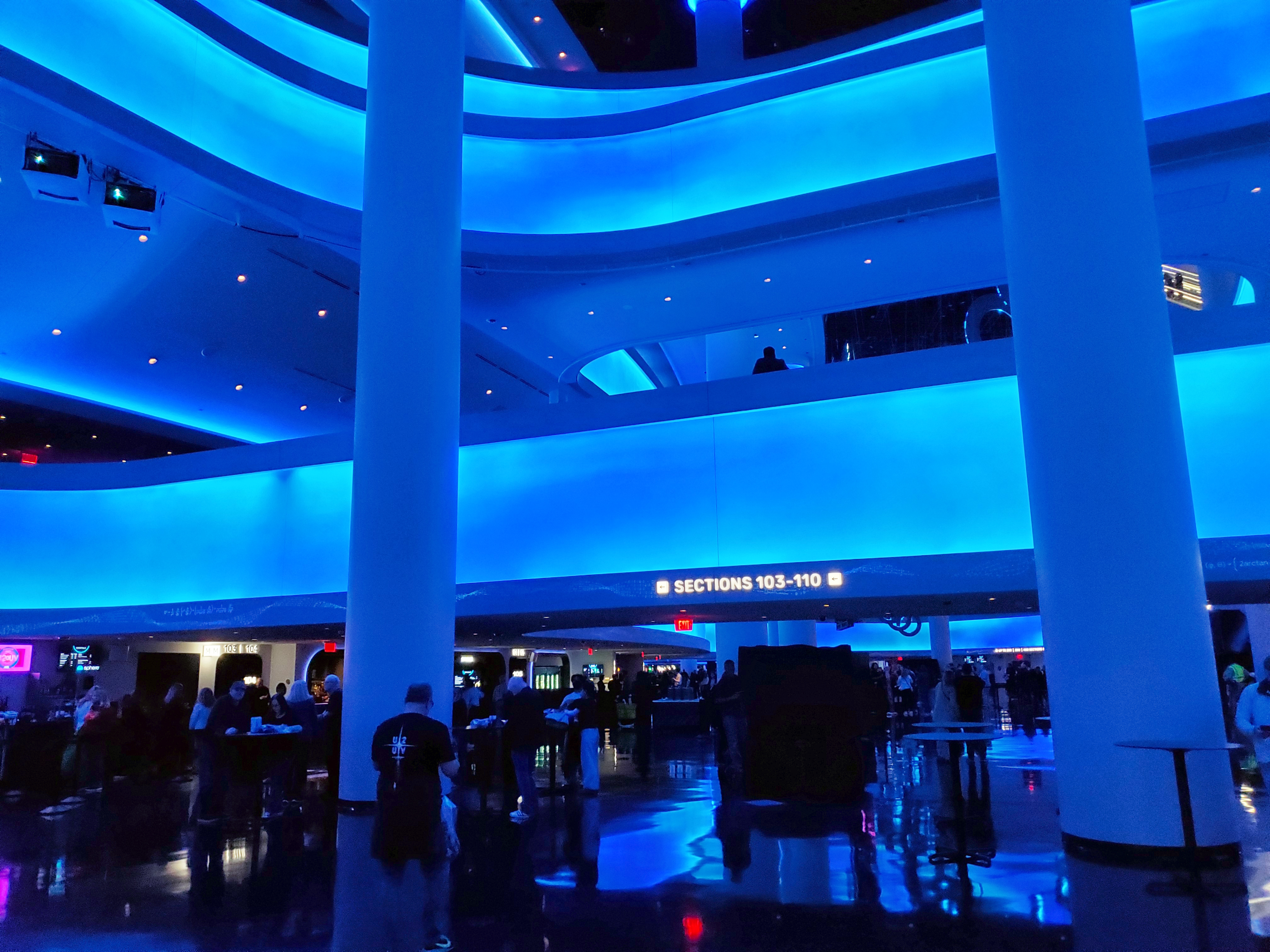

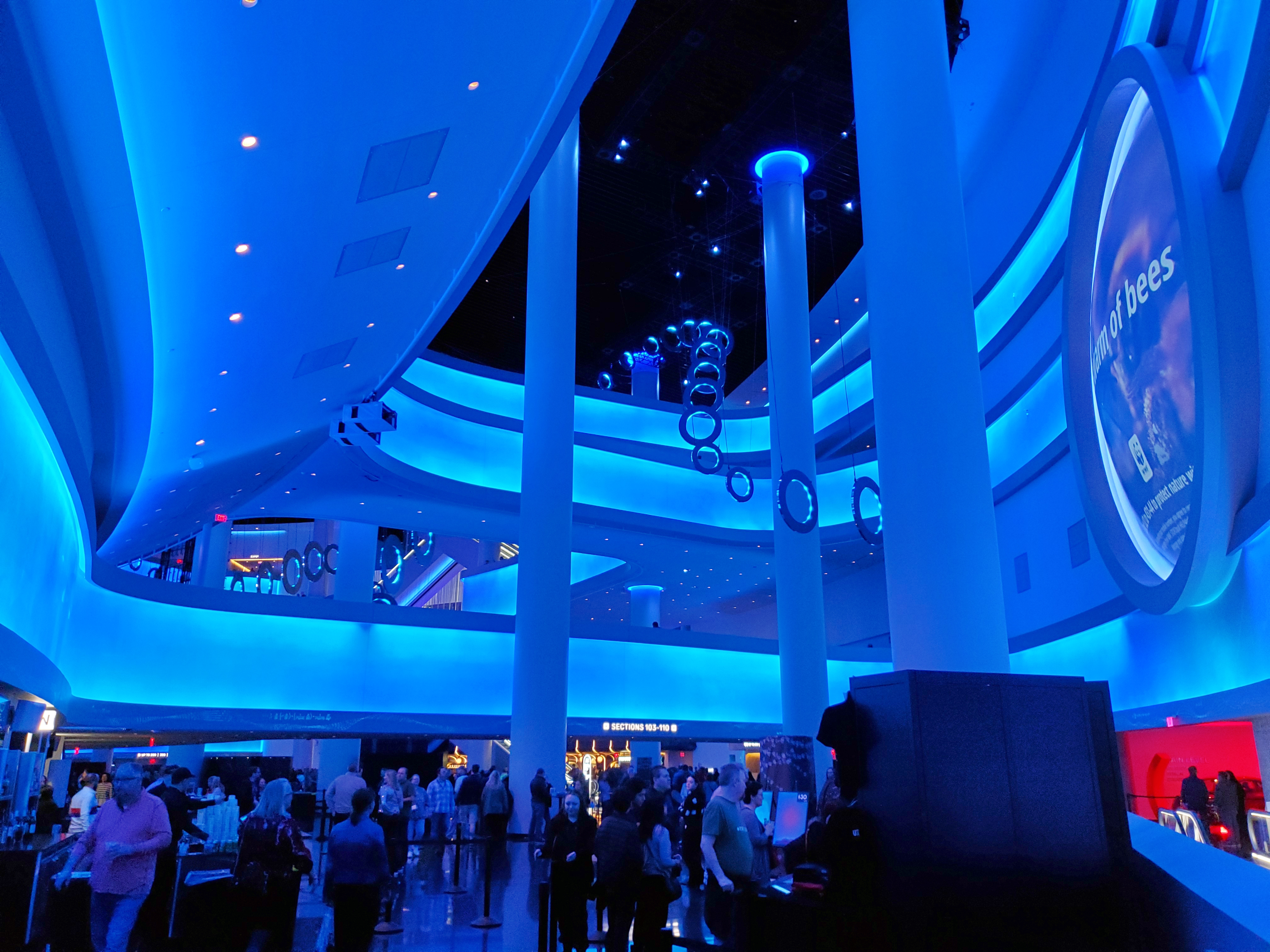

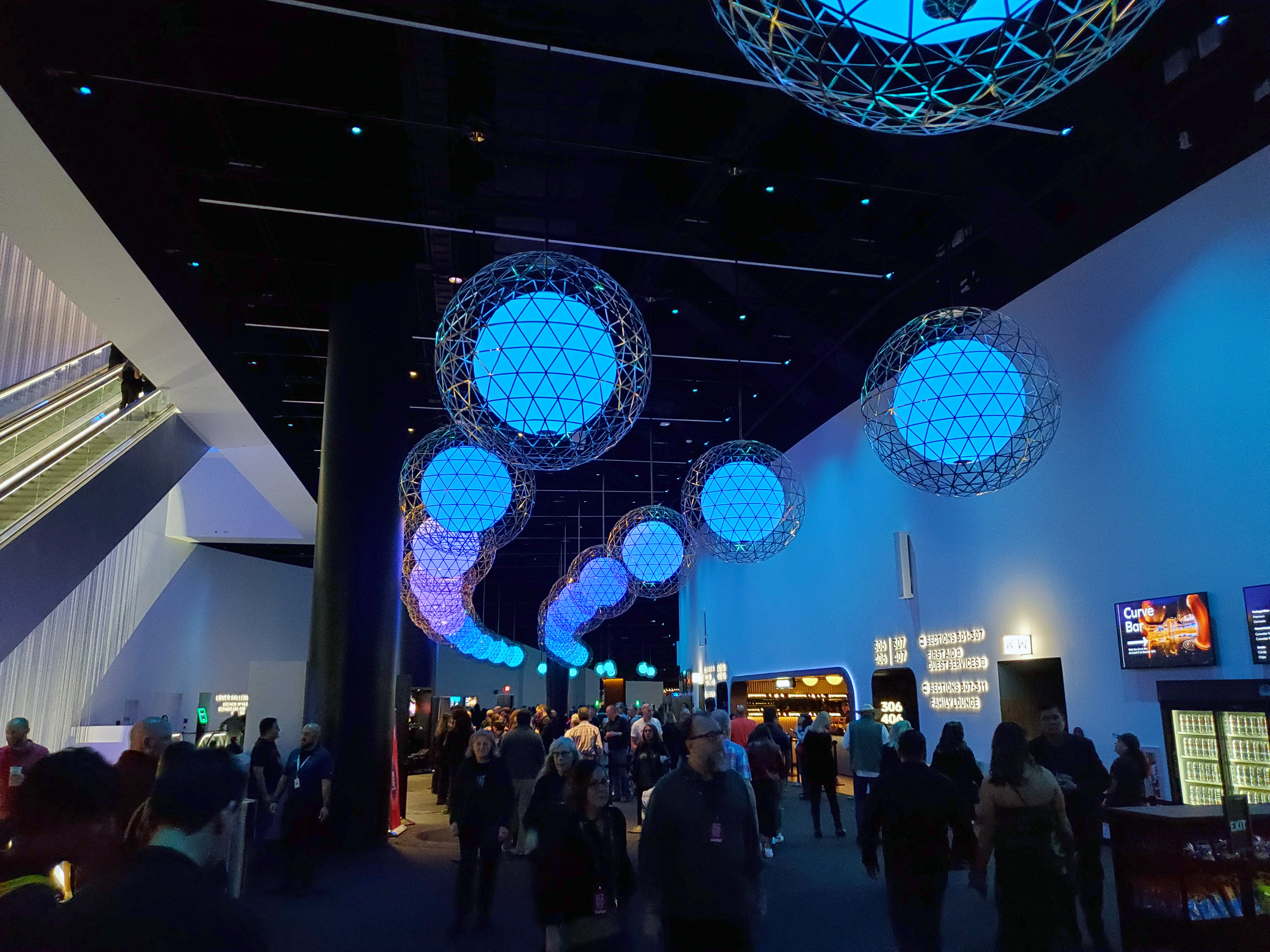

Concert

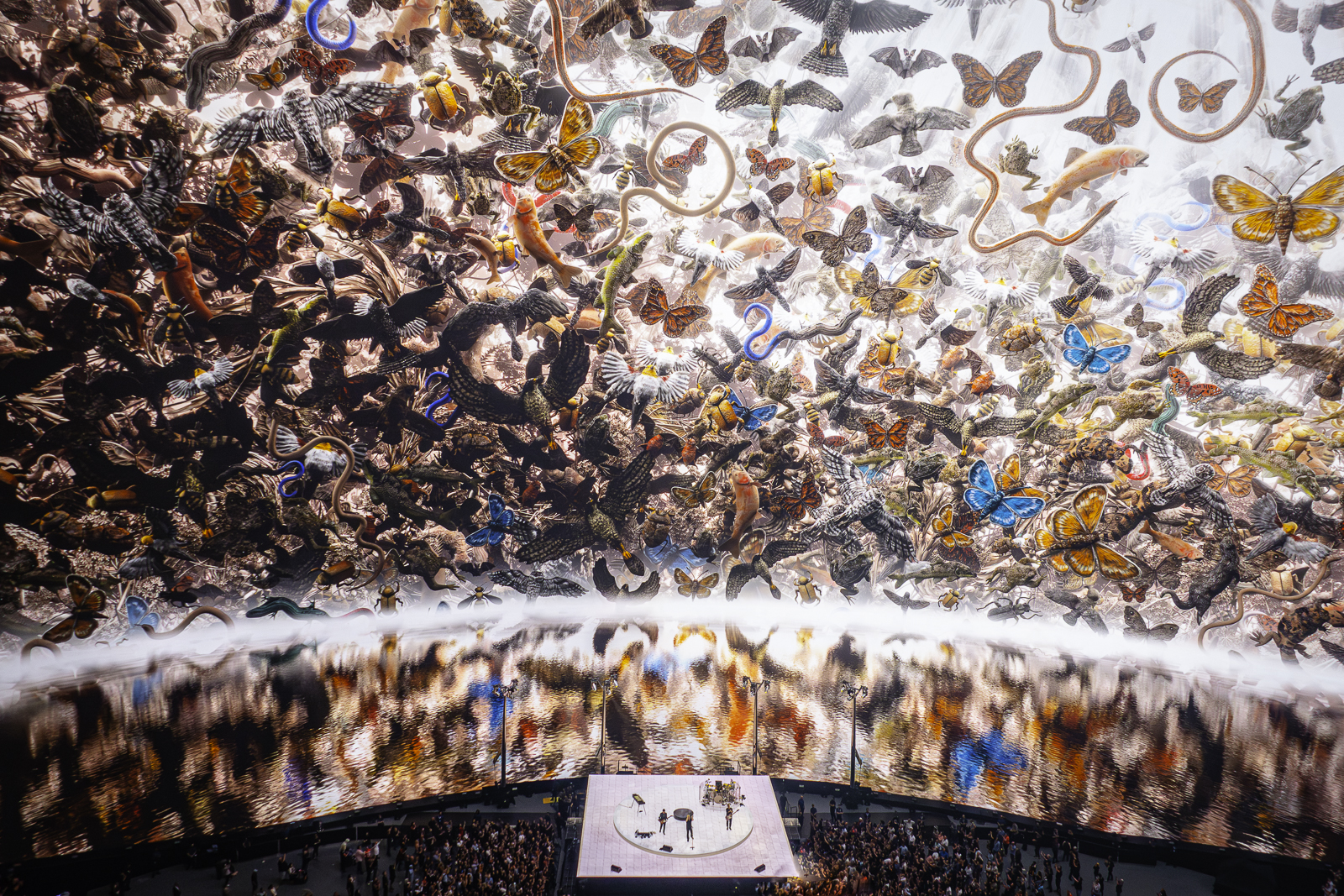

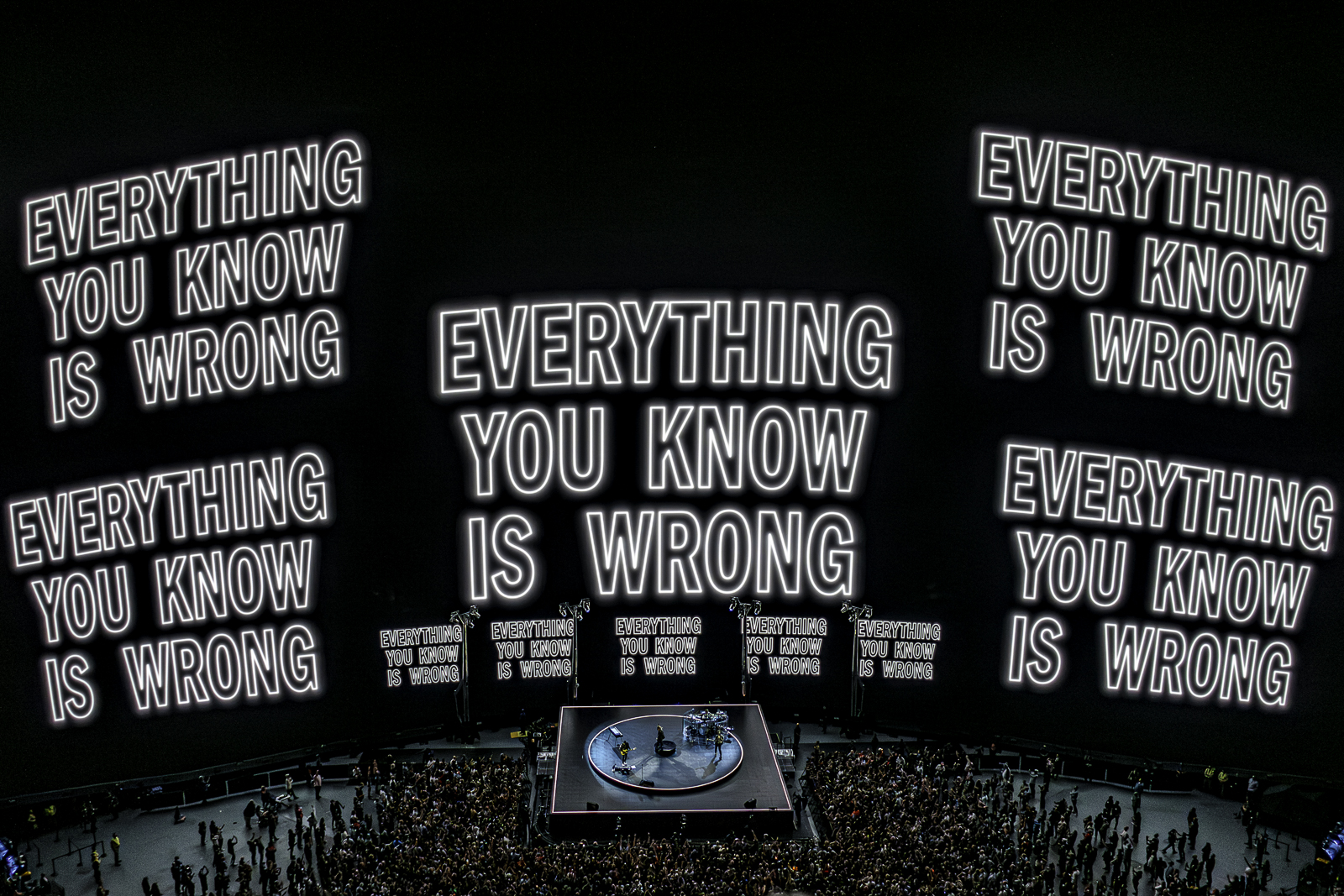

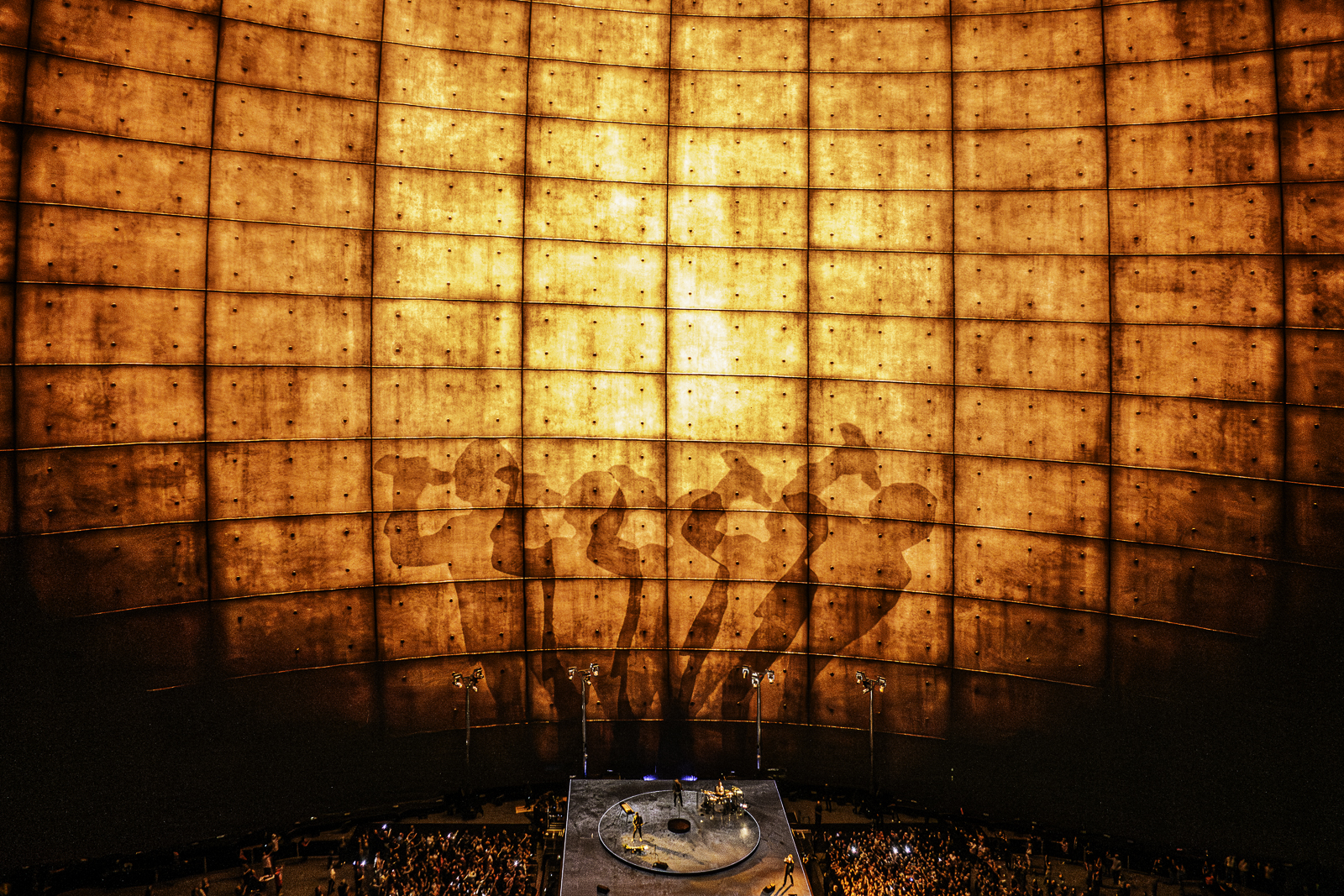

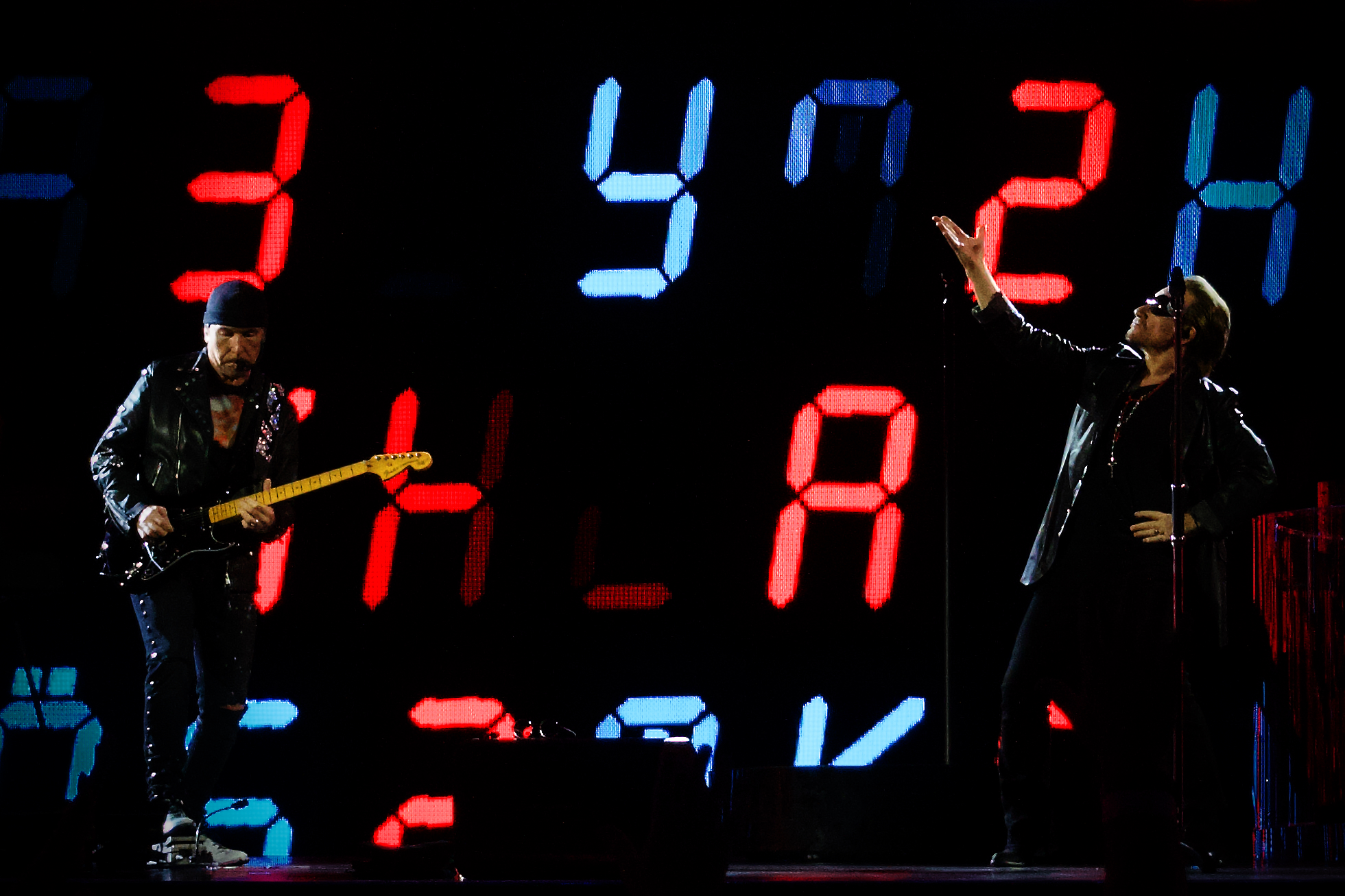

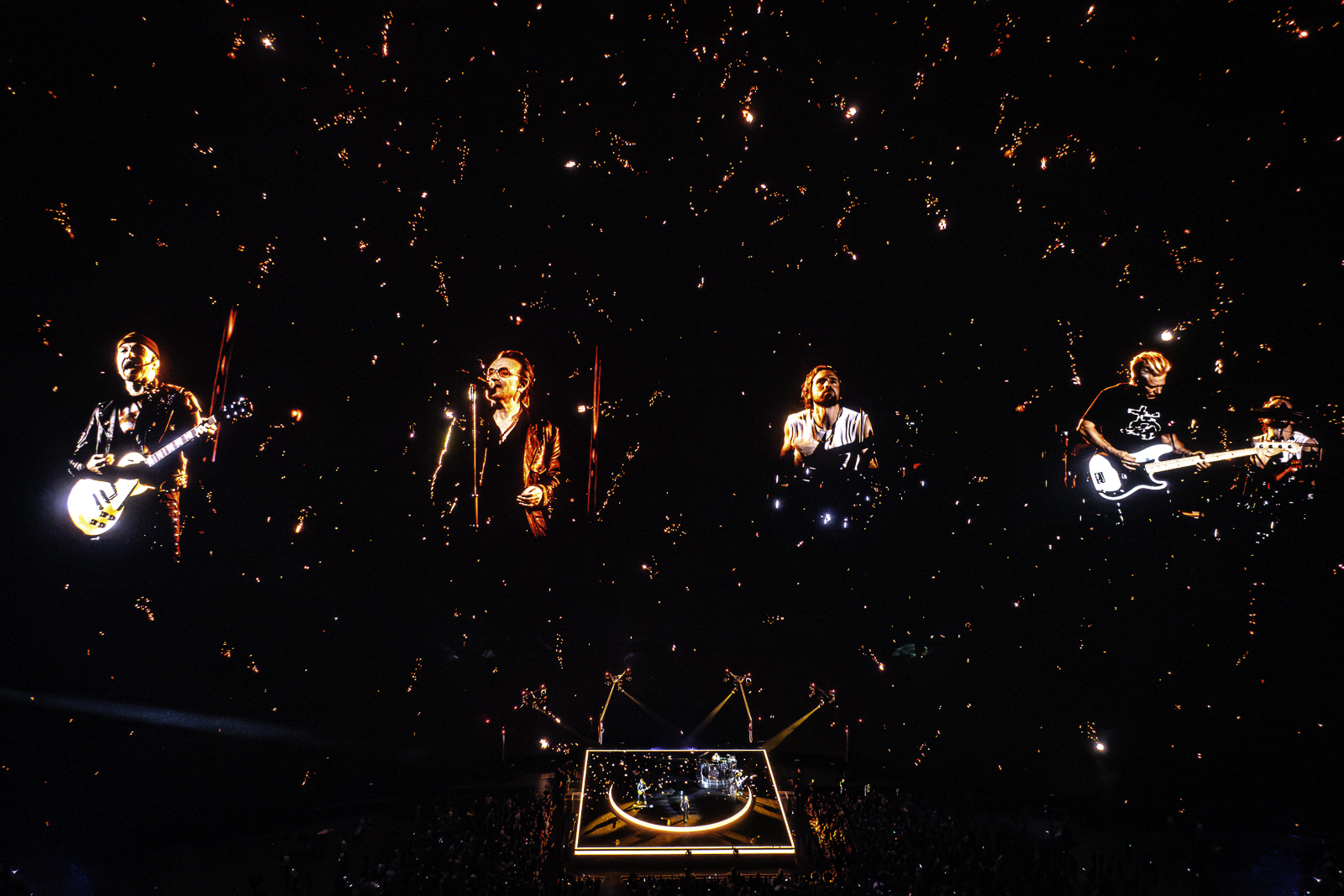

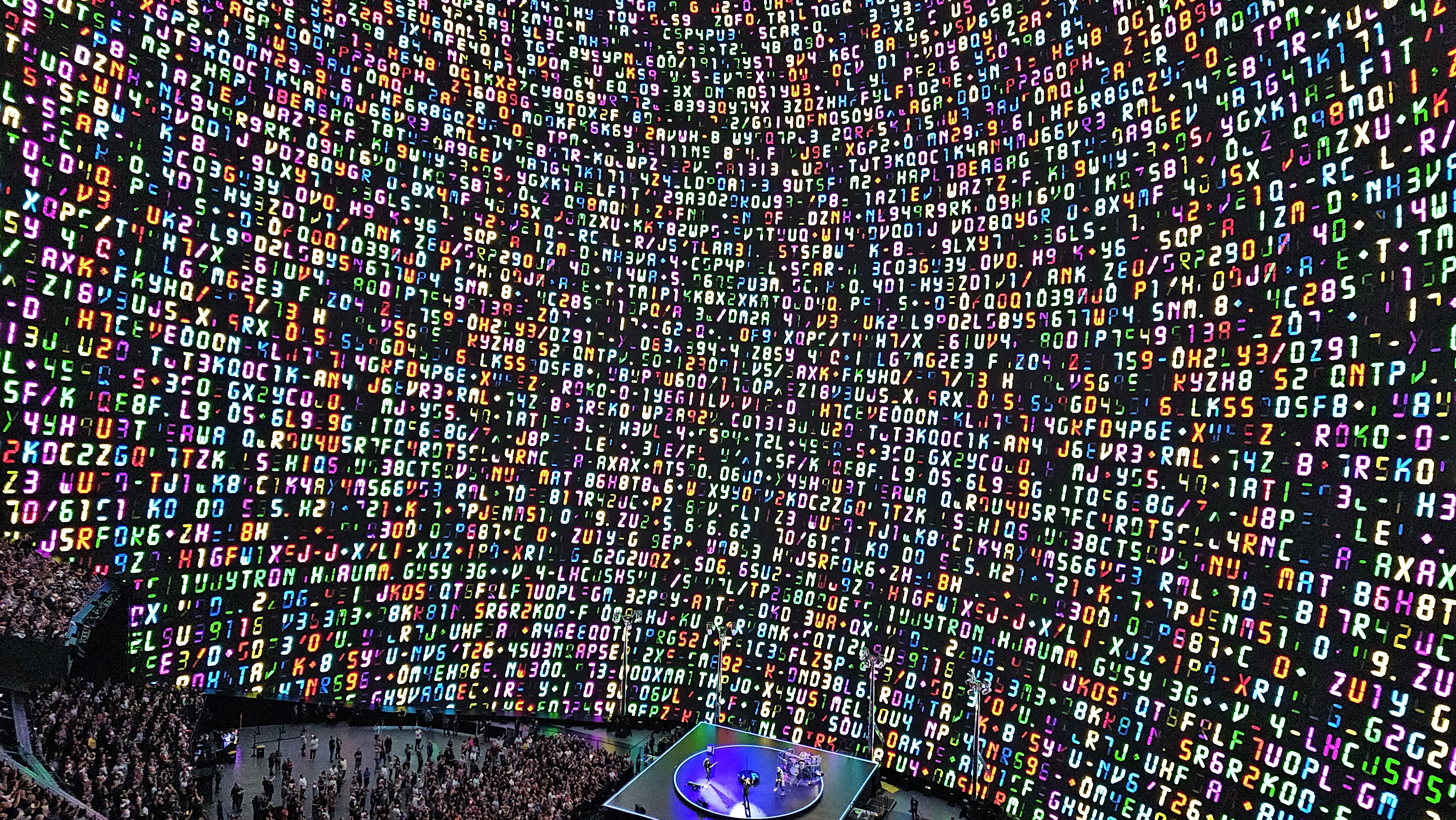

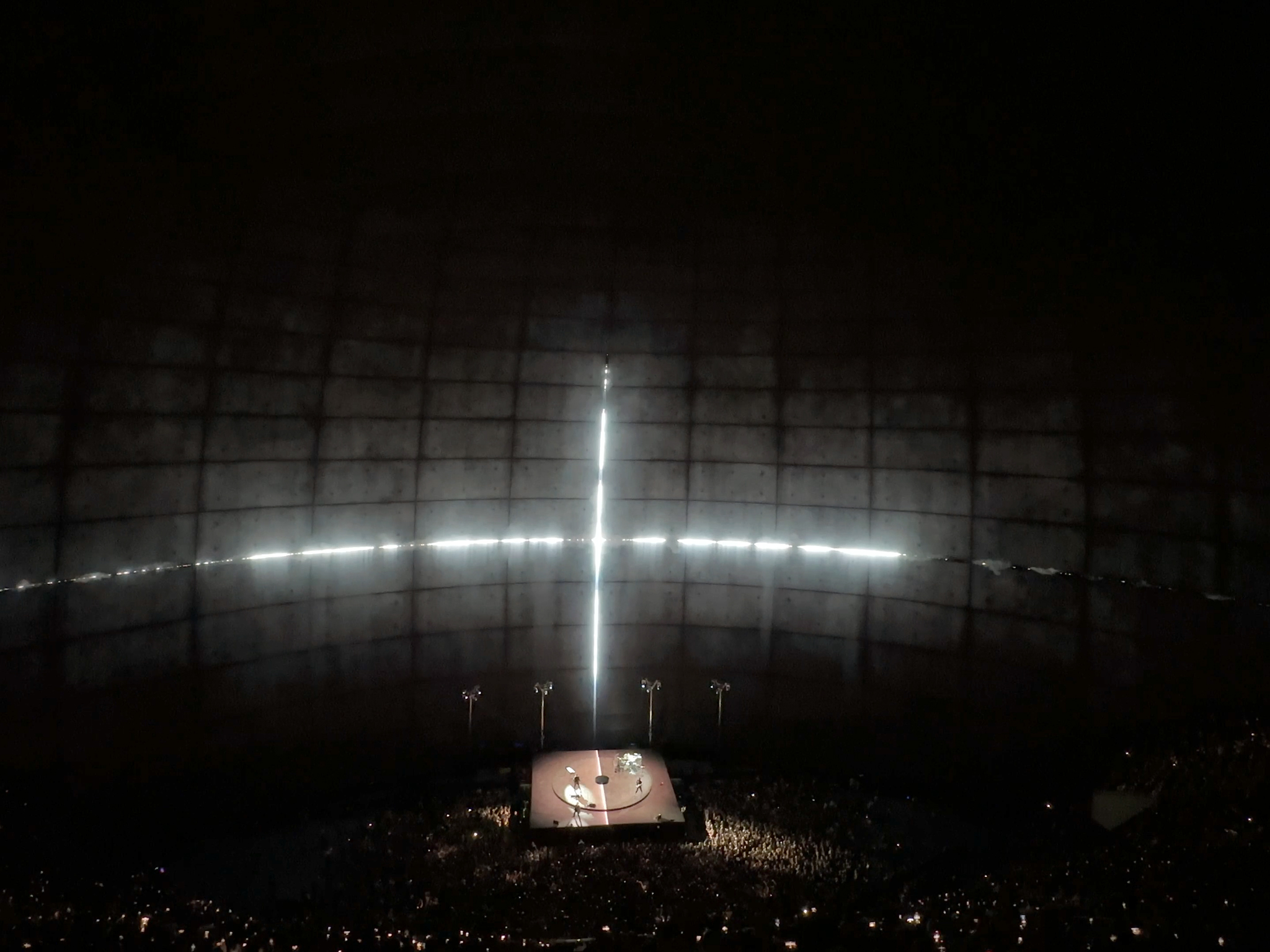

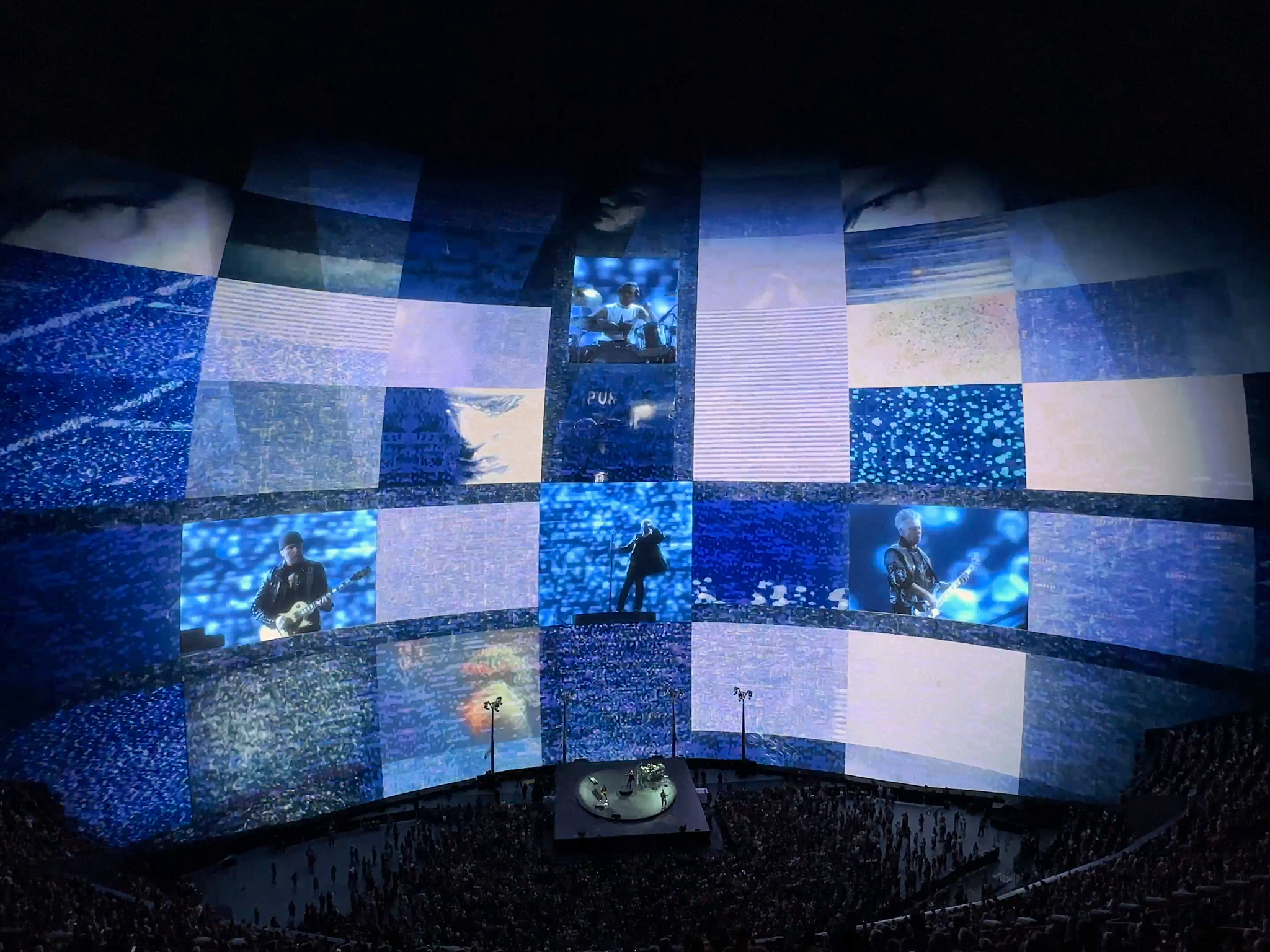

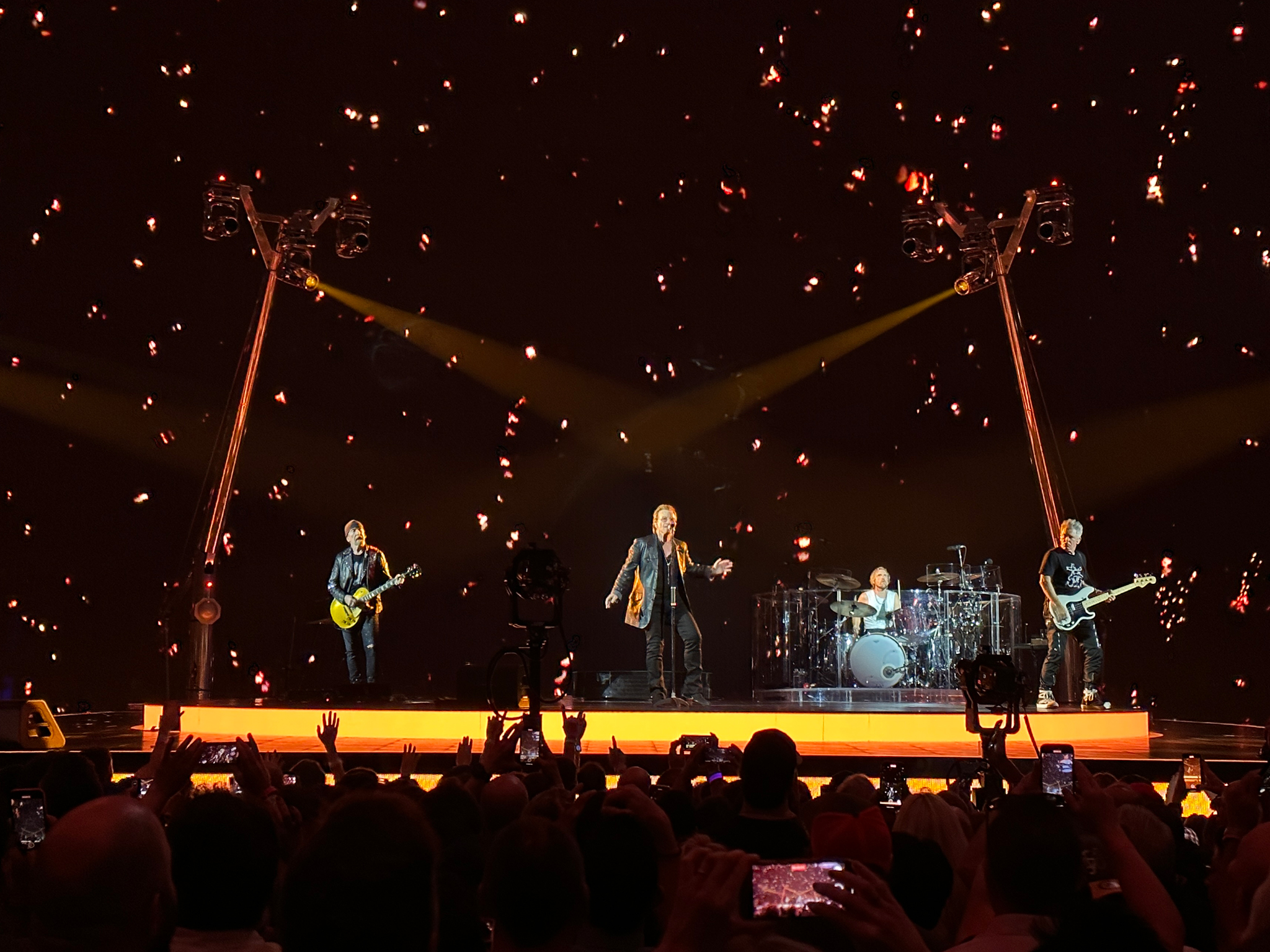

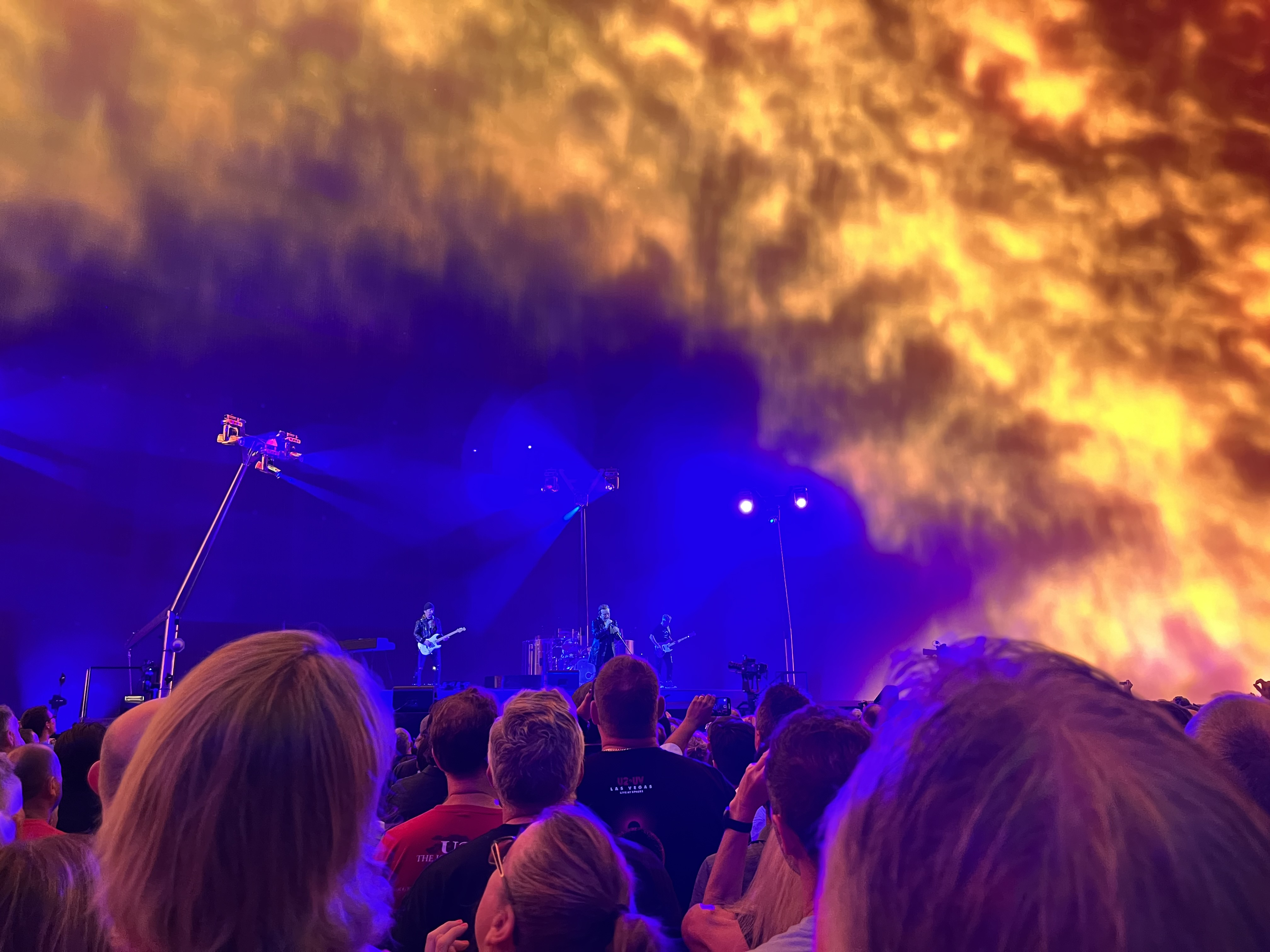

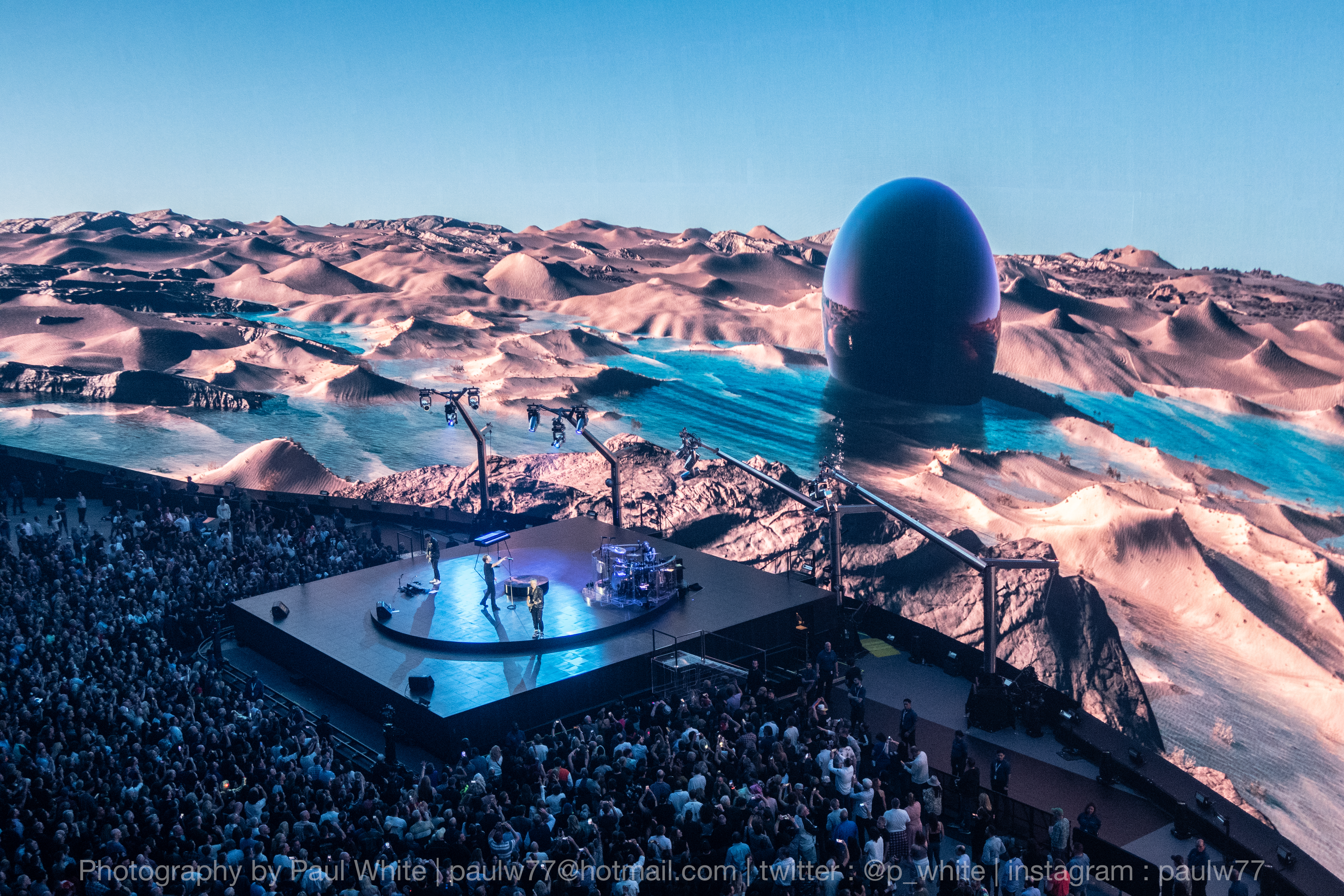

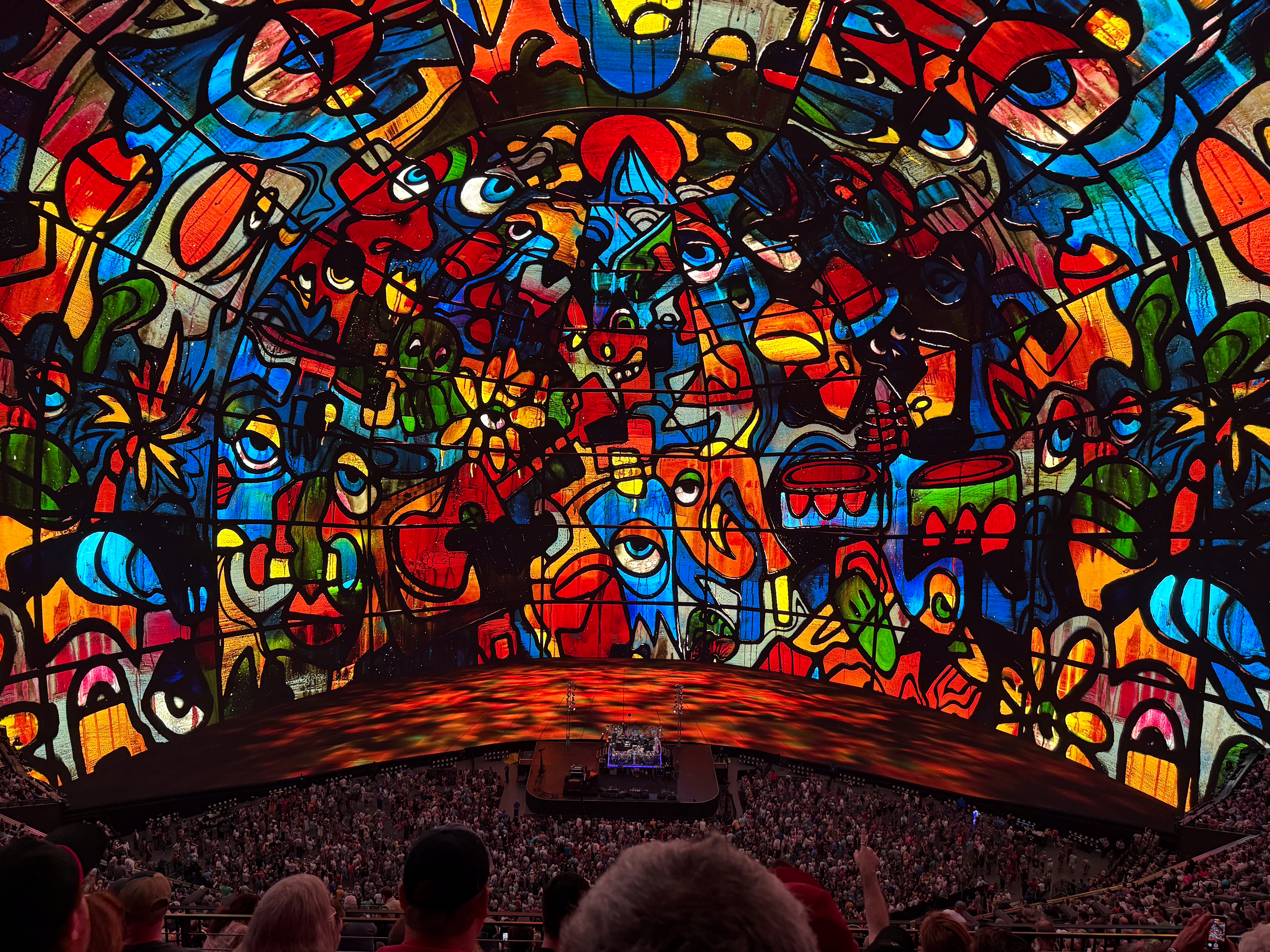

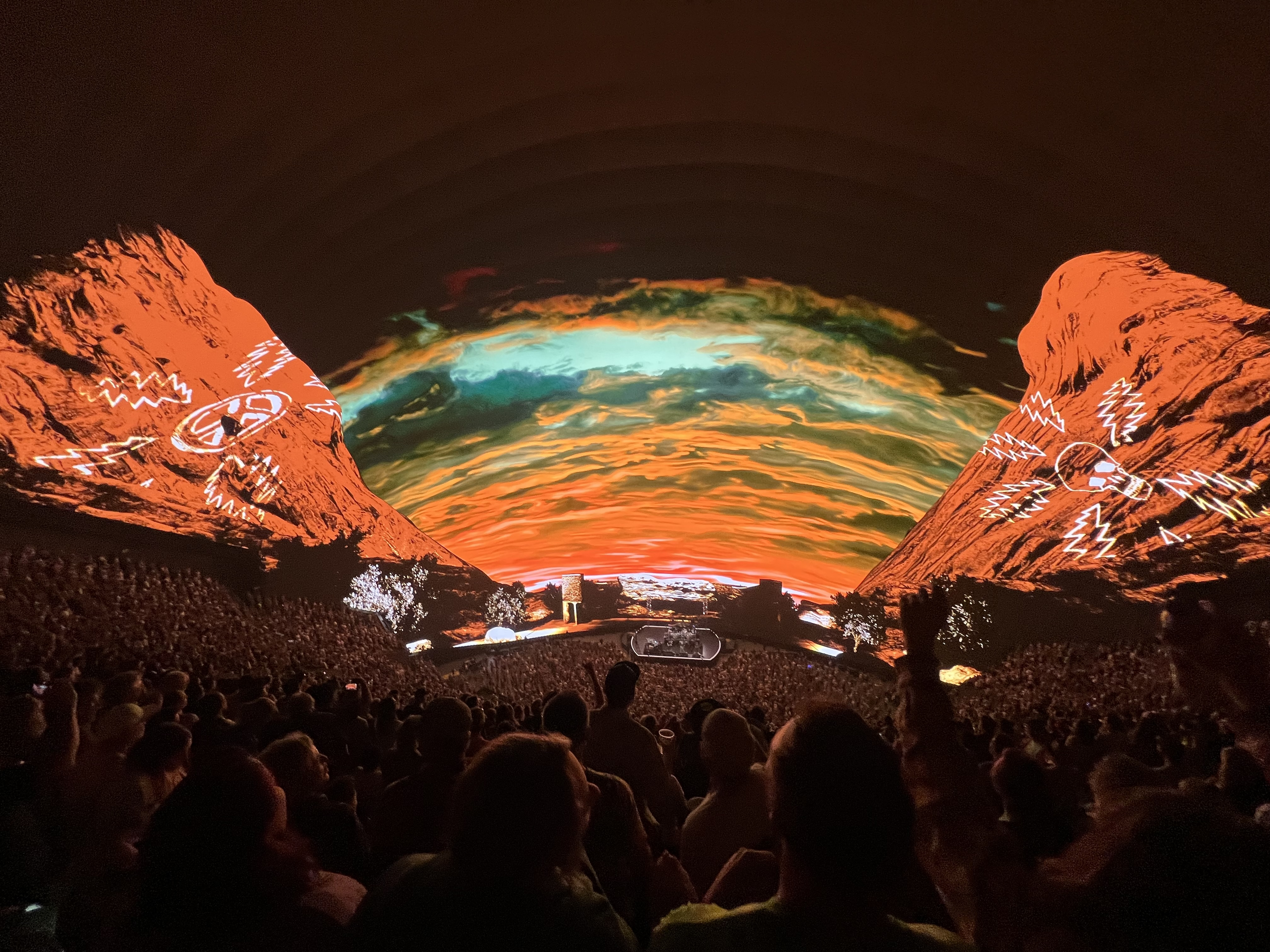

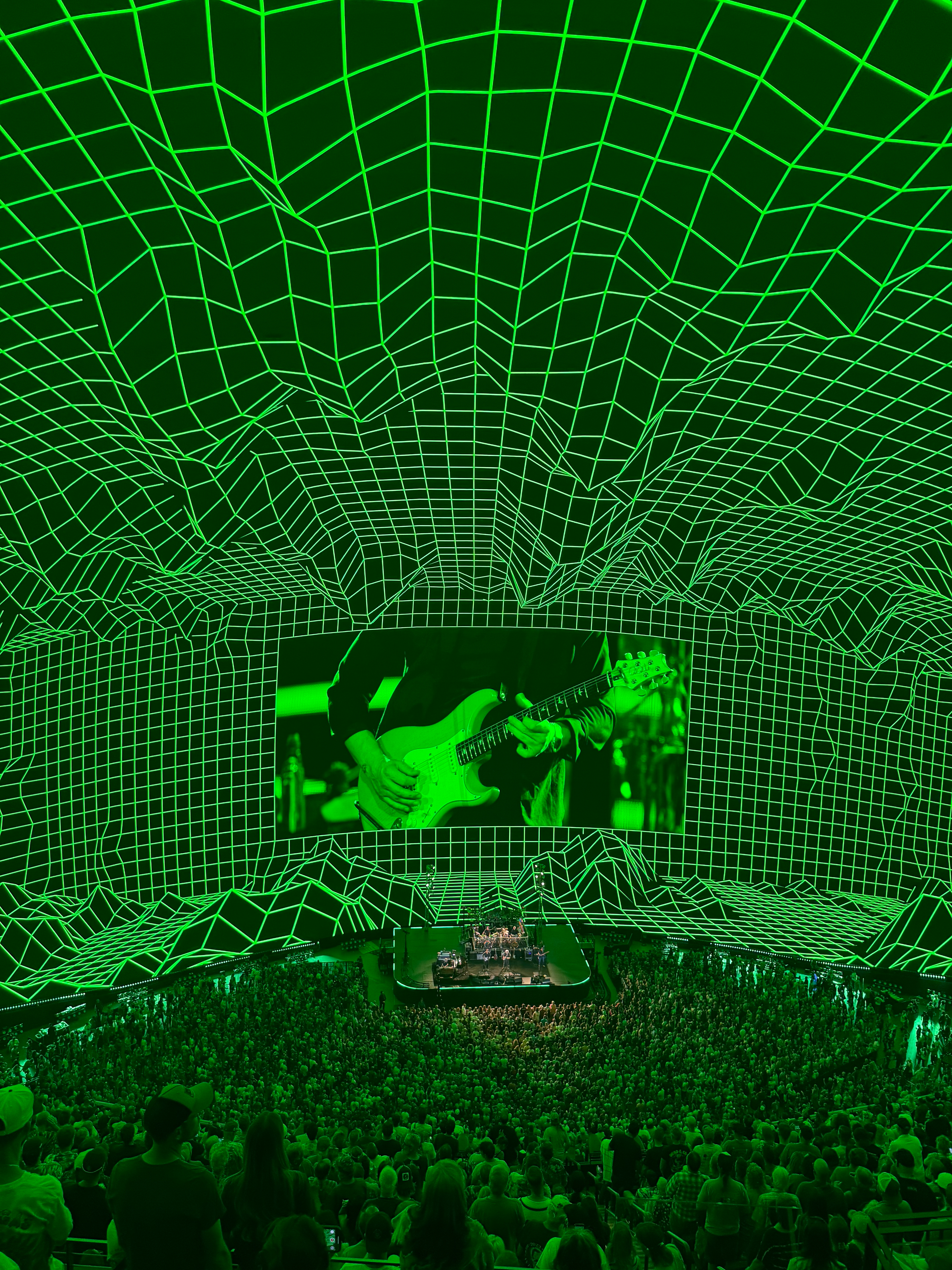

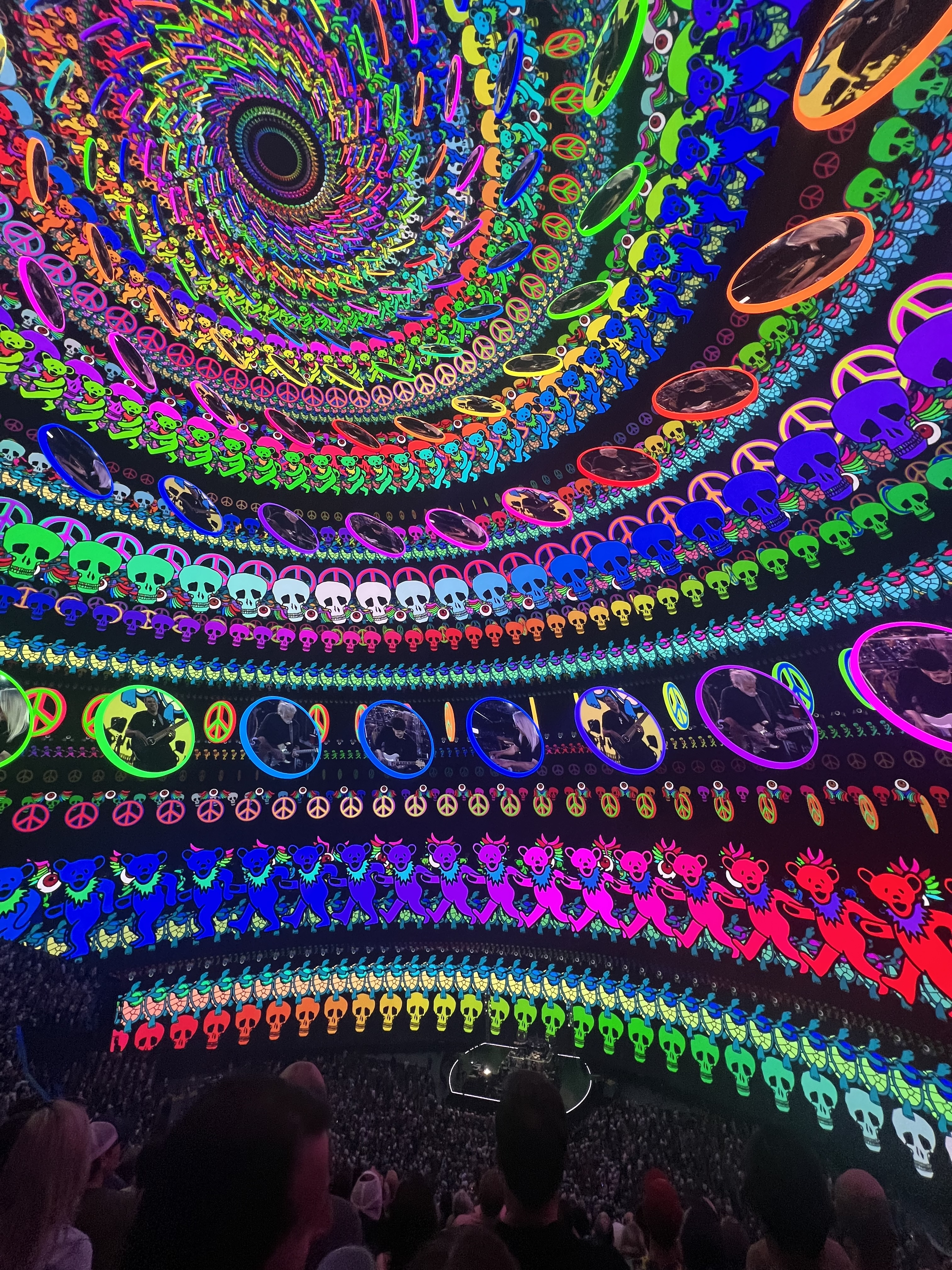

== See also ==
- Avicii Arena
- Cenotaph for Sir Isaac Newton
- Cinematic virtual reality
- Cinéorama, in 1900 in Paris, similar to Sphere
- Cinerama Dome
- Extended reality
- Fulldome
- IMAX
- Immersion (virtual reality)
- La Géode in Paris
- On-set virtual production
- Spaceship Earth (Epcot)
