= 2012 United States Senate election in Ohio =

- November 6, 2012
- Turnout: 70.54% (registered voters) ▲17.29pp
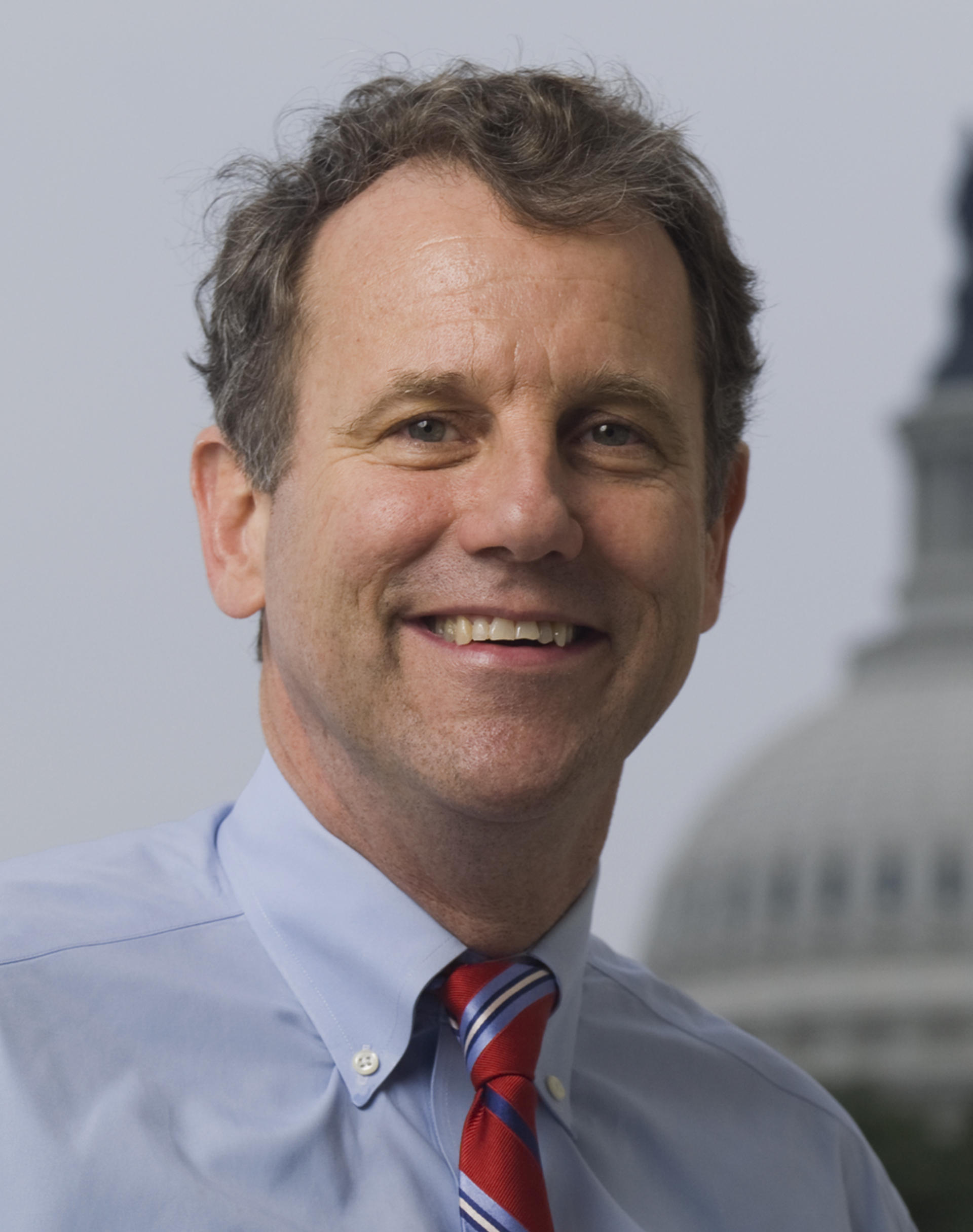

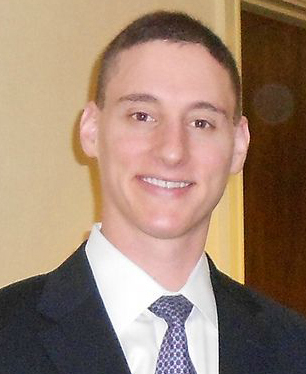
Nominee	Sherrod Brown	Josh Mandel
Party	Democratic	Republican
Popular vote	2,762,766	2,435,744
Percentage	50.70%	44.70%
- Brown: 40–50% 50–60% 60–70% 70–80% 80–90% >90% Mandel: 40–50% 50–60% 60–70% 70–80% 80–90% >90% Tie: 50% No votes
U.S. senator before election
Sherrod Brown
Democratic
Elected U.S. Senator
Sherrod Brown
Democratic

The 2012 United States Senate election in Ohio took place on November 6, 2012, concurrently with the 2012 U.S. presidential election, other elections to the United States Senate and House of Representatives, and various state and local elections. Incumbent Democratic U.S. Senator Sherrod Brown won re-election to a second term, defeating Republican Josh Mandel, the Ohio state treasurer. Brown was unopposed in the Democratic primary, while Mandel won the Republican primary with 63% of the vote.

== Democratic primary ==
=== Results ===
Democratic primary results
Party	Candidate	Votes	%
Democratic	Sherrod Brown (incumbent)	522,827	100.00%
Total votes		522,827	100.00%

== Republican primary ==
=== Candidates ===
==== Filed ====
- Russell Bliss
- David Dodt
- Donna Glisman, retired entrepreneur
- Eric LaMont Gregory, medical scientist
- Josh Mandel, Ohio state treasurer
- Michael Pryce, surgeon

==== Withdrew ====
- Kevin Coughlin, former Ohio state senator (dropped out)

==== Declined ====
- Jim Tressel, Ohio State football coach

=== Endorsements ===
Josh Mandel was endorsed by Rob Portman, U.S. senator (R-OH); Jim DeMint, U.S. senator (R-SC); Jim Jordan, U.S. congressman (R-OH); Club for Growth; National Rifle Association of America; Tea Party Express; John McCain, U.S. senator (R-AZ); Marco Rubio, U.S. senator (R-FL); Chris Christie, governor of New Jersey; Afghanistan & Iraq Veterans for Congress (AIVC); Buckeye Firearms Association; National Right to Life Committee; Ohio Right to Life; and National Federation of Independent Business.

=== Results ===
Results by county: Mandel: 30–40%; 40–50%; 50–60%; 60–70%; 70–80%; 80–90%

Republican primary results
Party	Candidate	Votes	%
Republican	Josh Mandel	586,556	63.02%
Republican	Michael Pryce	132,205	14.20%
Republican	Donna Glisman	115,621	12.42%
Republican	David Dodt	47,933	5.15%
Republican	Eric Gregory	47,740	5.13%
Republican	Russell Bliss (write-in)	644	0.07%
Total votes		930,699	100.00%

== General election ==
=== Candidates ===
- Sherrod Brown (Democratic), incumbent U.S. senator
- Josh Mandel (Republican), Ohio state treasurer
- Scott Rupert (Independent), truck driver

=== Debates ===
- Complete video of debate, October 15, 2012 - C-SPAN
- Complete video of debate, October 25, 2012 - C-SPAN

=== Campaign ===
U.S. Representative Sherrod Brown defeated two-term incumbent Republican U.S. Senator Mike DeWine 56%-44% in the 2006 election. Over the next six years, he established a very progressive, and populist record. The National Journal named Brown the most liberal U.S. Senator in the past two years. The Washington Post called him a "modern-day Paul Wellstone." One article said "Brown is way to the left of Ohio in general, but probably the only person who could outwork Brown is Portman." Brown is the only candidate the 60 Plus Association targeted in the 2012 election cycle.

Mandel, 34, was elected state treasurer in 2010. Before that, he was a Lyndhurst city councilman and Ohio state representative. He was criticized as Ohio treasurer for not fulfilling his pledge to serve a four-year term and for not attending any of the Board of Deposit monthly meetings. However, Mandel raised a lot of money. He was called a rising star in the Republican Party and was called "the rock star of the party." He was also compared to Marco Rubio.

Mandel's campaign was singled out by the independent fact-checking group Politifact for its "casual relationship with the truth" and its tendency to "double down" after inaccuracies were pointed out. The fact-checking group wrote: "For all the gifts Mandel has, from his compelling personal narrative as an Iraq war veteran to a well-oiled fundraising machine, whoppers are fast becoming a calling card of his candidacy."

Mandel raised $7.2 million through the first quarter of 2012. He had $5.3 million cash on hand, trailing Brown's $6.3 million. However, Mandel benefited from massive support from conservative out-of-state superPACs, which raise unlimited amounts of money from anonymous donors. These outside groups, including Crossroads GPS, aired over $60 million in TV advertising supporting Mandel and attacking Brown, outspending Democratically aligned outside groups by more than five-to-one. Mandel's campaign was aided by over $1 million spent primarily on attack ads by a 501(c)(4) organization called the Government Integrity Fund. The group was funded by anonymous donors and run by lobbyist Tom Norris of Columbus, Ohio-based Cap Square Solutions.

=== Endorsements ===
Brown was endorsed by the Cleveland Plain Dealer, the Columbus Dispatch, the Toledo Blade, the Youngstown Vindicator, The Cincinnati Enquirer, and the Akron Beacon-Journal.

Mandel was endorsed by the Warren Tribune-Chronicle and the Marietta Times.

=== Fundraising ===
Candidate (party)	Receipts	Disbursements	Cash on hand	Debt
Sherrod Brown (D)	$8,132,882	$3,379,775	$6,273,316	$0
Josh Mandel (R)	$7,286,390	$1,999,397	$5,286,993	$0
Scott Rupert (I)	$3,153	$2,594	$389	$0
Source: Federal Election Commission

==== Top contributors ====
Sherrod Brown	Contribution	Josh Mandel	Contribution
JStreetPAC	$71,175	Club for Growth	$172,904
Ohio State University	$69,470	Senate Conservatives Fund	$114,400
Kohrman, Jackson & Krantz	$59,500	Suarez Corp	$90,000
Cleveland Clinic	$57,971	Kasowitz Benson Torres & Friedman	$41,600
Forest City Enterprises	$51,600	American Financial Group	$32,750
American Electric Power	$42,350	Cintas Corp	$30,000
Squire Sanders	$39,400	Sullivan & Cromwell	$25,475
Baker & Hostetler	$38,906	Susquehanna International Group	$22,500
Case Western Reserve University	$35,450	Timken Company	$22,500
Vorys, Sater, Seymour and Pease	$34,167	Crawford Group	$22,000

==== Top industries ====
Sherrod Brown	Contribution	Josh Mandel	Contribution
Lawyers/law firms	$1,587,113	Retired	$480,900
Retired	$942,717	Financial institutions	$397,140
Health professionals	$536,954	Real estate	$371,057
Real estate	$435,066	Lawyers/law firms	$362,515
Lobbyists	$393,651	Leadership PACs	$320,050
Education	$369,722	Republican/Conservative	$278,924
Leadership PACs	$318,975	Manufacturing & distributing	$276,600
Hospitals/nursing homes	$286,072	Misc. finance	$205,350
Insurance	$223,983	Retail industry	$166,650
Financial institutions	$204,350	Pro-Israel	$163,000

=== Predictions ===
Source	Ranking	As of
The Cook Political Report	Lean D	November 1, 2012
Sabato's Crystal Ball	Lean D	November 5, 2012
Rothenberg Political Report	Lean D	November 2, 2012
Real Clear Politics	Lean D	November 5, 2012

=== Polling ===
Poll source	Date(s) administered	Sample size	Margin of error	Sherrod Brown (D)	Josh Mandel (R)	Other	Undecided
Public Policy Polling	March 10–13, 2011	559	±4.1%	48%	32%	—	21%
Quinnipiac	May 10–16, 2011	1,379	±2.6%	45%	31%	2%	21%
Public Policy Polling	May 19–22, 2011	565	±4.1%	48%	31%	—	21%
Quinnipiac	July 12–18, 2011	1,659	±4.1%	49%	34%	1%	16%
Public Policy Polling	August 11–14, 2011	792	±3.5%	48%	33%	—	19%
Quinnipiac	September 20–25, 2011	1,301	±2.7%	49%	36%	—	13%
Public Policy Polling	October 13–16, 2011	581	±4.1%	48%	40%	—	12%
Quinnipiac	October 17–23, 2011	1,668	±2.4%	49%	34%	1%	14%
Public Policy Polling	November 4–6, 2011	1,421	±2.6%	48%	35%	—	14%
Quinnipiac	January 9–16, 2012	1,610	±2.4%	47%	32%	1%	18%
Public Policy Polling	January 28–29, 2012	820	±3.4%	47%	36%	—	17%
Rasmussen Reports	February 8, 2012	500	±4.5%	44%	40%	4%	12%
Quinnipiac	February 7–12, 2012	500	±4.5%	48%	35%	4%	17%
NBC News/Marist	February 29 – March 2, 2012	3,079	±1.8%	47%	37%	—	16%
Quinnipiac	March 20–26, 2012	1,246	±2.8%	46%	36%	3%	14%
Rasmussen Reports	March 26, 2012	500	±4.5%	43%	43%	3%	11%
Rasmussen Reports	April 18, 2012	500	±4.5%	44%	41%	3%	12%
Public Policy Polling	May 3–6, 2012	875	±3.3%	45%	37%	—	19%
Quinnipiac	May 2–7, 2012	1,069	±3.0%	46%	40%	1%	13%
NBC News/Marist	May 17–20, 2012	1,103	±3.0%	51%	37%	—	12%
Rasmussen Reports	May 29, 2012	500	±4.5%	47%	42%	3%	7%
Public Policy Polling	June 21–24, 2012	673	±3.8%	46%	39%	—	15%
Quinnipiac	June 19–25, 2012	1,237	±2.8%	50%	34%	1%	14%
Rasmussen Reports	July 18, 2012	500	±4.5%	46%	42%	4%	8%
Magellan Strategies	July 23–24, 2012	597	±4.0%	45%	38%	12%	5%
Quinnipiac	July 24–30, 2012	1,193	±2.8%	51%	39%	1%	9%
Rasmussen Reports	August 13, 2012	500	±4.5%	44%	44%	3%	9%
Quinnipiac	August 15–21, 2012	1,253	±2.8%	48%	45%	1%	10%
Ohio Poll	August 16–21, 2012	847	±3.4%	48%	47%	—	5%
Columbus Dispatch	August 15–25, 2012	1,758	±2.1%	44%	44%	—	12%
Gravis Marketing	September 7–8, 2012	1,548	±2.7%	47%	42%	—	11%
Public Policy Polling	September 7–9, 2012	1,072	±3.0%	48%	40%	—	11%
NBC/WSJ/Marist Poll	September 9–11, 2012	979	±3.1%	49%	42%	—	9%
Rasmussen Reports	September 12, 2012	500	±4.5%	49%	41%	3%	7%
Ohio Newspaper Organization	September 13–18, 2012	861	±3.3%	52%	45%	1%	2%
Fox News Poll	September 16–18, 2012	1,009	±3.0%	47%	40%	1%	9%
Gravis Marketing	September 21–22, 2012	594	±4.3%	44%	43%	—	13%
The Washington Post	September 19–23, 2012	934	±4.0%	53%	41%	—	6%
CBS/The New York Times/Quinnipiac	September 18–24, 2012	1,162	±4.0%	50%	40%	—	10%
NBC/WSJ/Marist	September 30 – October 1, 2012	931	±3.2%	50%	41%	1%	7%
Rasmussen Reports	October 4, 2012	500	±4.5%	46%	46%	2%	6%
SurveyUSA	October 5–8, 2012	808	±3.5%	42%	38%	4%	16%
NBC/WSJ/Marist Poll	October 7–9, 2012	994	±3.1%	52%	41%	1%	6%
Rasmussen Reports	October 10, 2012	500	±4.5%	47%	46%	2%	4%
Public Policy Polling	October 12–13, 2012	880	±3.3%	49%	42%	—	9%
Survey USA	October 12–15, 2012	613	±4.0%	43%	38%	4%	14%
Rasmussen Reports	October 17, 2012	750	±4.0%	49%	44%	1%	5%
CBS News/Quinnipiac	October 17–20, 2012	1,548	±3.0%	51%	42%	—	7%
Public Policy Polling	October 18–20, 2012	532	±4.3%	49%	44%	—	7%
Angus Reid Public Opinion	October 18–20, 2012	550	±4.2%	52%	45%	3%	—
Suffolk	October 18–21, 2012	600	unknown	46%	39%	6%	10%
Pharos Research	October 19–21, 2012	810	±3.4%	52%	41%	—	7%
SurveyUSA	October 20–22, 2012	725	±4.2%	43%	42%	3%	12%
Rasmussen Reports	October 23, 2012	750	±4.0%	48%	44%	2%	5%
The Cincinnati Enquirer/Ohio News	October 18–23, 2012	1,015	±3.1%	51%	47%	1%	2%
Gravis Marketing	October 27, 2012	730	±3.6%	48%	47%	—	5%
CBS/Quinnipiac University	October 23–28, 2012	1,110	±3.0%	51%	42%	—	7%
Public Policy Polling	October 26–28, 2012	718	±3.7%	53%	42%	—	6%
Pharos Research	October 26–28, 2012	765	±3.5%	53%	43%	—	7%
Rasmussen Reports	October 28, 2012	750	±4.0%	50%	48%	1%	1%
SurveyUSA	October 26–29, 2012	603	±4.1%	46%	41%	3%	10%
University of Cincinnati/Ohio Poll	October 25–30, 2012	1,182	±2.9%	49%	44%	4%	3%
Reuters/Ipsos	October 29–31, 2012	885	±3.8%	49%	41%	4%	6%
NBC/WSJ/Marist	October 31 – November 1, 2012	971	±3.1%	50%	45%	1%	4%
Rasmussen Reports	November 1, 2012	750	±4.0%	48%	48%	2%	2%
Columbus Dispatch	October 24 – November 3, 2012	1,501	±2.2%	51%	45%	4%	—
Ohio Poll/Univ. of Cincinnati	October 31 – November 4, 2012	901	±3.3%	51%	47%	3%	—
SurveyUSA	November 1–4, 2012	803	±3.5%	44%	41%	4%	9%
Angus Reid Public Opinion	November 2–4, 2012	572	±4.1%	52%	46%	2%	—
Public Policy Polling	November 3–4, 2012	1,000	±3.1%	54%	44%	—	3%
Rasmussen Reports	November 4, 2012	750	±4%	50%	48%	1%	1%

Hypothetical polling

Democratic primary

Poll source	Date(s) administered	Sample size	Margin of error	Sherrod Brown	Other/ Undecided
American Public Polling	January 23, 2012	1,600	±3%	77%	23%
American Public Polling	February 6, 2012	1,600	±3%	84%	16%
American Public Polling	February 13, 2012	1,600	±3%	81%	19%
American Public Polling	February 20–27, 2012	1,600	±3%	91%	9%

Republican primary

Poll source	Date(s) administered	Sample size	Margin of error	Kevin Coughlin	Josh Mandel	Other/ Undecided
Quinnipiac	July 12–18, 2011	563	±4.1%	12%	35%	46%
Public Policy Polling	August 11–14, 2011	400	±4.9%	12%	31%	57%
Quinnipiac	September 20–25, 2011	423	±4.8%	12%	33%	53%

Poll source	Date(s) administered	Sample size	Margin of error	Ken Blackwell	Kevin Coughlin	Josh Mandel	Other/ Undecided
Quinnipiac	May 10–16, 2011	1,379	±2.6%	33%	5%	17%	46%

General election

Poll source	Date(s) administered	Sample size	Margin of error	Sherrod Brown (D)	Ken Blackwell (R)	Other	Undecided
Quinnipiac	May 10–16, 2011	1,379	±2.6%	44%	35%	2%	18%
Public Policy Polling	May 19–22, 2011	565	±4.1%	51%	33%	—	15%

Poll source	Date(s) administered	Sample size	Margin of error	Sherrod Brown (D)	Drew Carey (R)	Other	Undecided
Public Policy Polling	March 10–13, 2011	559	±4.1%	49%	34%	—	17%

Poll source	Date(s) administered	Sample size	Margin of error	Sherrod Brown (D)	Kevin Coughlin (R)	Other	Undecided
Quinnipiac	May 10–16, 2011	1,379	±2.6%	44%	28%	3%	23%
Public Policy Polling	May 19–22, 2011	565	±4.1%	51%	30%	—	19%
Quinnipiac	July 12–18, 2011	1,659	±4.1%	50%	32%	1%	18%
Public Policy Polling	August 11–14, 2011	792	±3.5%	47%	33%	—	20%
Quinnipiac	September 20–25, 2011	1,301	±2.7%	53%	32%	—	13%
Public Policy Polling	581	±4.1%	48%	37%	—	15%	
Quinnipiac	October 17–23, 2011	1,668	±2.4%	51%	30%	1%	16%

Poll source	Date(s) administered	Sample size	Margin of error	Sherrod Brown (D)	Mike DeWine (R)	Other	Undecided
Public Policy Polling	December 10–12, 2010	510	±4.3%	43%	43%	—	14%

Poll source	Date(s) administered	Sample size	Margin of error	Sherrod Brown (D)	Jon Husted (R)	Other	Undecided
Public Policy Polling	December 10–12, 2010	510	±4.3%	43%	38%	—	18%
Public Policy Polling	March 10–13, 2011	559	±4.1%	49%	34%	—	18%

Poll source	Date(s) administered	Sample size	Margin of error	Sherrod Brown (D)	Jim Jordan (R)	Other	Undecided
Public Policy Polling	December 10–12, 2010	510	±4.3%	43%	35%	—	22%
Public Policy Polling	March 10–13, 2011	559	±4.1%	49%	30%	—	21%
Public Policy Polling	May 19–22, 2011	565	±4.1%	49%	31%	—	21%
Public Policy Polling	August 11–14, 2011	792	±3.5%	47%	35%	—	18%

Poll source	Date(s) administered	Sample size	Margin of error	Sherrod Brown (D)	Steve LaTourette (R)	Other	Undecided
Public Policy Polling	March 10–13, 2011	559	±4.1%	48%	30%	—	22%

Poll source	Date(s) administered	Sample size	Margin of error	Sherrod Brown (D)	Mary Taylor (R)	Other	Undecided
Public Policy Polling	December 10–12, 2010	510	±4.3%	40%	38%	—	22%
Public Policy Polling	March 10–13, 2011	559	±4.1%	49%	30%	—	21%
Public Policy Polling	May 19–22, 2011	565	±4.1%	50%	31%	—	19%

Poll source	Date(s) administered	Sample size	Margin of error	Sherrod Brown (D)	Jim Tressel (R)	Other	Undecided
Public Policy Polling	August 11–14, 2011	792	±3.5%	46%	34%	—	20%

=== Results ===
United States Senate election in Ohio, 2012
Party	Candidate	Votes	%	±%
Democratic	Sherrod Brown (incumbent)	2,762,766	50.70%	−5.46%
Republican	Josh Mandel	2,435,744	44.70%	+0.88%
Independent	Scott Rupert	250,618	4.60%	N/A
Total votes		5,449,128	100.00%	N/A
Democratic hold				

==== By county ====
County	Sherrod Brown Democratic		Josh Mandel Republican		Scott Rupert Independent		Margin		Total votes cast
County	#	%	#	%	#	%	#	%	Total votes cast
Adams	3,924	35.86%	6,410	58.58%	609	5.56%	-2,486	-22.72%	10,943
Allen	17,456	36.51%	28,817	60.28%	1,535	3.21%	-11,361	-23.77%	47,808
Ashland	8,006	33.56%	14,260	59.77%	1,593	6.67%	-6,254	-26.21%	23,859
Ashtabula	21,973	51.58%	17,780	41.74%	2,848	6.68%	4,193	9.84%	42,601
Athens	17,662	65.59%	8,066	29.95%	1,200	4.46%	9,596	35.64%	26,928
Auglaize	5,417	23.72%	16,481	72.16%	942	4.12%	-11,064	-48.44%	22,840
Belmont	15,021	48.81%	14,370	46.69%	1,385	4.50%	651	2.12%	30,776
Brown	6,613	36.58%	10,473	57.93%	994	5.49%	-3,860	-21.35%	18,080
Butler	61,933	37.15%	97,228	58.32%	7,540	4.53%	-35,295	-21.17%	166,071
Carroll	5,154	39.87%	6,727	52.04%	1,046	8.09%	-1,573	-12.17%	12,927
Champaign	6,565	36.00%	10,541	57.80%	1,131	6.20%	-3,976	-21.80%	18,237
Clark	30,599	47.98%	30,220	47.39%	2,951	4.63%	379	0.59%	63,770
Clermont	29,834	32.12%	58,220	62.69%	4,820	5.19%	-28,386	-30.57%	92,874
Clinton	5,730	31.93%	11,211	62.46%	1,007	5.61%	-5,481	-30.53%	17,948
Columbiana	20,382	44.83%	21,884	48.13%	3,201	7.04%	-1,502	-3.30%	45,467
Coshocton	6,457	41.44%	8,037	51.58%	1,088	6.98%	-1,580	-10.14%	15,582
Crawford	7,197	36.77%	11,168	57.06%	1,206	6.17%	-3,971	-20.29%	19,571
Cuyahoga	427,567	69.47%	167,263	27.18%	20,614	3.35%	260,334	42.29%	615,474
Darke	6,649	26.48%	17,204	68.50%	1,261	5.02%	-10,555	-42.02%	25,114
Defiance	7,314	40.80%	9,566	53.36%	1,047	5.84%	-2,252	-12.56%	17,927
Delaware	37,374	38.68%	55,260	57.18%	4,001	4.14%	-17,886	-18.50%	96,635
Erie	21,035	54.11%	15,653	40.27%	2,186	5.62%	5,382	13.84%	38,874
Fairfield	29,111	41.01%	38,185	53.79%	3,691	5.20%	-9,074	-12.78%	70,987
Fayette	4,000	37.53%	6,121	57.43%	537	5.04%	-2,121	-19.90%	10,658
Franklin	339,260	60.52%	199,293	35.55%	22,041	3.93%	139,967	24.97%	560,594
Fulton	8,534	40.79%	11,269	53.87%	1,117	5.34%	-2,735	-13.08%	20,920
Gallia	5,060	41.05%	6,760	54.84%	507	4.11%	-1,700	-13.79%	12,327
Geauga	20,264	40.49%	27,533	55.01%	2,255	4.50%	-7,269	-14.52%	50,052
Greene	32,243	39.15%	46,979	57.04%	3,142	3.81%	-14,736	-17.89%	82,364
Guernsey	6,868	42.09%	8,477	51.96%	971	5.95%	-1,609	-9.87%	16,316
Hamilton	219,299	53.52%	176,058	42.97%	14,388	3.51%	43,241	10.55%	409,745
Hancock	11,894	33.80%	21,520	61.16%	1,773	5.04%	-9,626	-27.36%	35,187
Hardin	4,416	36.01%	7,131	58.15%	717	5.84%	-2,715	-22.14%	12,264
Harrison	3,176	44.97%	3,498	49.53%	389	5.50%	-322	-4.56%	7,063
Henry	5,448	38.87%	7,738	55.21%	829	5.92%	-2,290	-16.34%	14,015
Highland	5,982	33.93%	10,683	60.60%	964	5.47%	-4,701	-26.67%	17,629
Hocking	5,717	45.46%	6,057	48.16%	802	6.38%	-340	-2.70%	12,576
Holmes	2,506	22.00%	8,252	72.44%	633	5.56%	-5,746	-50.44%	11,391
Huron	10,083	41.53%	12,443	51.25%	1,751	7.22%	-2,360	-9.72%	24,277
Jackson	5,258	39.88%	7,268	55.13%	658	4.99%	-2,010	-15.25%	13,184
Jefferson	16,031	49.61%	14,786	45.76%	1,496	4.63%	1,245	3.85%	32,313
Knox	10,186	36.40%	16,237	58.02%	1,562	5.58%	-6,051	-21.62%	27,985
Lake	54,981	48.27%	52,795	46.35%	6,128	5.38%	2,186	1.92%	113,904
Lawrence	11,085	45.12%	12,407	50.50%	1,076	4.38%	-1,322	-5.38%	24,568
Licking	33,097	41.25%	42,691	53.21%	4,445	5.54%	-9,594	-11.96%	80,233
Logan	6,479	30.82%	13,303	63.28%	1,240	5.90%	-6,824	-32.46%	21,022
Lorain	80,854	57.51%	53,332	37.93%	6,415	4.56%	27,522	19.58%	140,601
Lucas	131,887	64.21%	65,067	31.68%	8,452	4.11%	66,820	32.53%	205,406
Madison	6,518	38.56%	9,379	55.49%	1,005	5.95%	-2,861	-16.93%	16,902
Mahoning	76,182	66.38%	33,480	29.17%	5,104	4.45%	42,702	37.21%	114,766
Marion	11,376	42.11%	13,656	50.55%	1,985	7.34%	-2,280	-8.44%	27,017
Medina	39,008	43.95%	45,176	50.90%	4,562	5.15%	-6,168	-6.95%	88,746
Meigs	4,132	41.78%	5,175	52.32%	584	5.90%	-1,043	-10.54%	9,891
Mercer	4,736	22.21%	15,743	73.81%	849	3.98%	-11,007	-51.60%	21,328
Miami	15,968	31.32%	32,866	64.46%	2,156	4.22%	-16,898	-33.14%	50,990
Monroe	3,274	49.01%	3,114	46.62%	292	4.37%	160	2.39%	6,680
Montgomery	135,210	51.77%	116,345	44.55%	9,615	3.68%	18,865	7.22%	261,170
Morgan	2,625	43.55%	3,065	50.85%	337	5.60%	-440	-7.30%	6,027
Morrow	5,511	34.37%	9,414	58.71%	1,111	6.92%	-3,903	-24.34%	16,036
Muskingum	15,592	42.60%	18,748	51.23%	2,257	6.17%	-3,156	-8.63%	36,597
Noble	2,127	36.67%	3,311	57.09%	362	6.24%	-1,184	-20.42%	5,800
Ottawa	11,291	50.68%	9,872	44.31%	1,115	5.01%	1,419	6.37%	22,278
Paulding	3,277	36.61%	5,147	57.50%	528	5.89%	-1,870	-20.89%	8,952
Perry	6,734	45.28%	7,240	48.69%	897	6.03%	-506	-3.41%	14,871
Pickaway	9,344	39.17%	13,177	55.23%	1,337	5.60%	-3,833	-16.06%	23,858
Pike	5,751	50.32%	5,117	44.77%	561	4.91%	634	5.55%	11,429
Portage	37,144	50.07%	32,531	43.85%	4,506	6.08%	4,613	6.22%	74,181
Preble	6,045	30.31%	12,820	64.29%	1,076	5.40%	-6,775	-33.98%	19,941
Putnam	4,584	25.18%	12,899	70.85%	722	3.97%	-8,315	-45.67%	18,205
Richland	23,758	41.54%	30,696	53.67%	2,742	4.79%	-6,938	-12.13%	57,196
Ross	14,147	47.42%	14,059	47.12%	1,629	5.46%	88	0.30%	29,835
Sandusky	13,606	47.48%	13,280	46.34%	1,770	6.18%	326	1.14%	28,656
Scioto	15,116	51.41%	12,958	44.07%	1,329	4.52%	2,158	7.34%	29,403
Seneca	10,525	42.05%	12,802	51.15%	1,703	6.80%	-2,277	-9.10%	25,030
Shelby	6,045	26.01%	16,087	69.22%	1,107	4.77%	-10,042	-43.21%	23,239
Stark	87,493	49.40%	78,708	44.44%	10,926	6.16%	8,785	4.96%	177,127
Summit	151,198	57.67%	98,442	37.55%	12,541	4.78%	52,756	20.12%	262,181
Trumbull	62,386	62.61%	32,066	32.18%	5,195	5.21%	30,320	30.43%	99,647
Tuscarawas	17,940	44.31%	19,946	49.27%	2,598	6.42%	-2,006	-4.96%	40,484
Union	8,144	32.49%	15,553	62.05%	1,369	5.46%	-7,409	-29.56%	25,066
Van Wert	3,630	26.63%	9,401	68.98%	598	4.39%	-5,771	-42.35%	13,269
Vinton	2,414	44.73%	2,679	49.64%	304	5.63%	-265	-4.91%	5,397
Warren	33,787	30.98%	70,755	64.87%	4,528	4.15%	-36,968	-33.89%	109,070
Washington	11,464	39.80%	15,904	55.21%	1,438	4.99%	-4,440	-15.41%	28,806
Wayne	19,072	38.06%	28,138	56.15%	2,906	5.79%	-9,066	-18.09%	50,116
Williams	6,640	38.81%	9,294	54.32%	1,177	6.87%	-2,654	-15.51%	17,111
Wood	31,633	50.59%	27,905	44.63%	2,985	4.78%	3,728	5.96%	62,523
Wyandot	3,728	35.75%	6,074	58.24%	627	6.01%	-2,346	-22.49%	10,429
Totals	2,762,766	50.70%	2,435,744	44.70%	250,618	4.60%	327,022	6.00%	5,449,128

Counties that flipped from Democratic to Republican

- Richland (largest city: Mansfield)
- Harrison (largest city: Cadiz)
- Hocking (largest city: Logan)
- Jackson (largest city: Jackson)
- Lawrence (largest city: Ironton)
- Noble (largest city: Caldwell)
- Vinton (largest city: McArthur)
- Seneca (largest city: Tiffin)
- Huron (largest city: Norwalk)
- Columbiana (largest city: Salem)
- Carroll (largest city: Carrollton)
- Meigs (largest city: Middleport)
- Tuscarawas (largest city: New Philadelphia)
- Guernsey (largest city: Cambridge)
- Coshocton (largest city: Coshocton)
- Geauga (largest city: Chardon)
- Medina (largest city: Medina)
- Marion (largest city: Marion)
- Morgan (largest city: McConnelsville)
- Washington (largest city: Marietta)
- Muskingum (largest city: Zanesville)
- Perry (largest city: New Lexington)

Counties that flipped from Republican to Democratic

- Hamilton (largest municipality: Cincinnati)

==== By congressional district ====
Brown won six of 16 congressional districts, including two that elected Republicans to the House.

District	Brown	Mandel	Representative
1st	47.20%	49.13%	Steve Chabot
2nd	44.52%	51.01%	Jean Schmidt (112th Congress)
2nd	44.52%	51.01%	Brad Wenstrup (113th Congress)
3rd	68.41%	27.73%	Mike Turner (112th Congress)
3rd	68.41%	27.73%	Joyce Beatty (113th Congress)
4th	40.48%	54.19%	Jim Jordan
5th	43.26%	51.76%	Bob Latta
6th	44.46%	49.92%	Bill Johnson
7th	44.18%	49.81%	Steve Austria (112th Congress)
7th	44.18%	49.81%	Bob Gibbs (113th Congress)
8th	36.53%	58.92%	John Boehner
9th	66.47%	28.93%	Marcy Kaptur
10th	48.52%	47.74%	Dennis Kucinich (112th Congress)
10th	48.52%	47.74%	Mike Turner (113th Congress)
11th	81.90%	15.71%	Marcia Fudge
12th	44.27%	51.09%	Pat Tiberi
13th	63.80%	30.99%	Betty Sutton (112th Congress)
13th	63.80%	30.99%	Tim Ryan (113th Congress)
14th	48.07%	47.14%	Steve LaTourette (112th Congress)
14th	48.07%	47.14%	Dave Joyce (113th Congress)
15th	46.15%	48.89%	Steve Stivers
16th	46.46%	48.47%	Jim Renacci

== See also ==
- 2012 United States Senate elections
- 2012 United States House of Representatives elections in Ohio
