= Sherrod Brown =

American politician (born 1952)

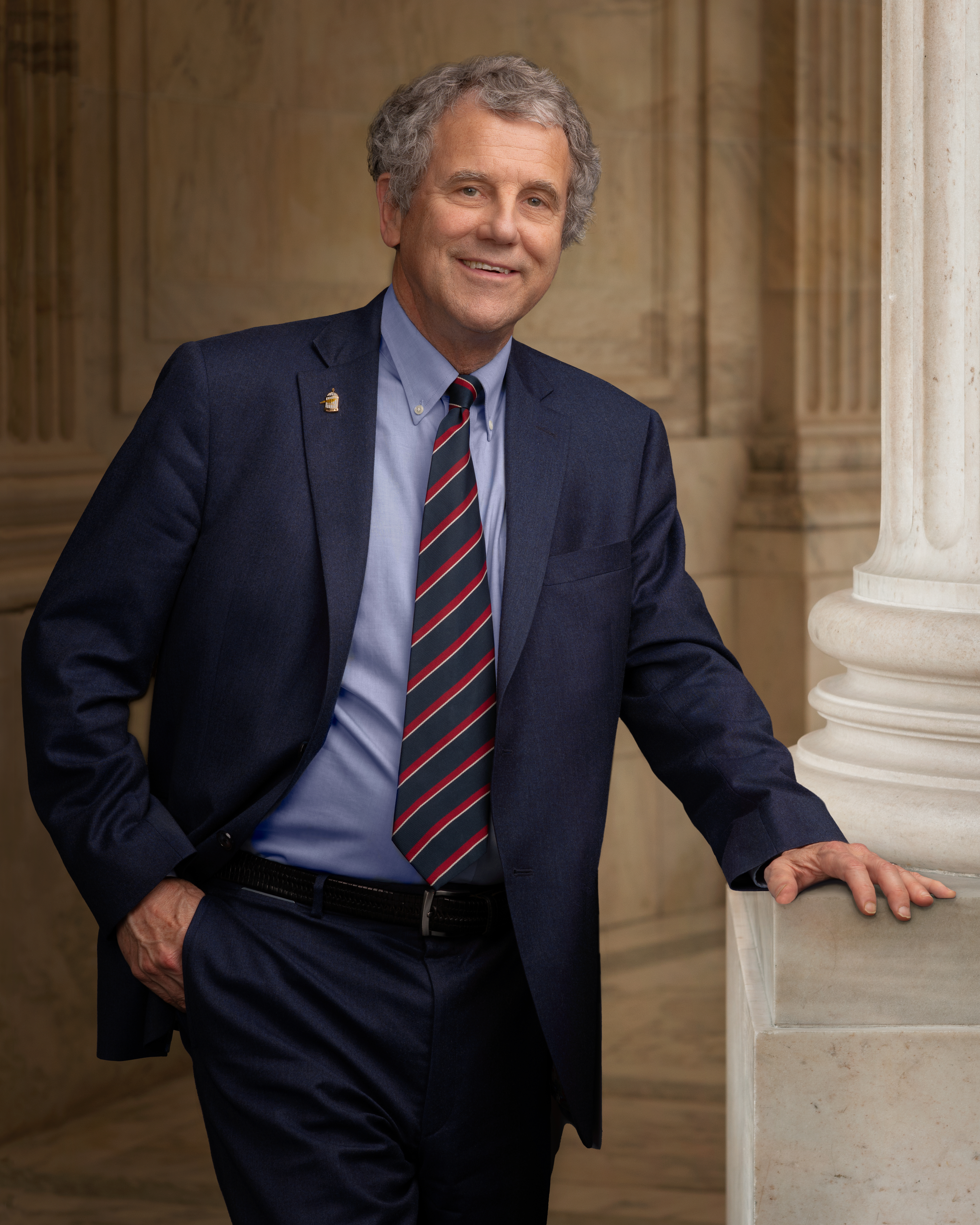
- Official portrait, 2021

United States Senator-elect from Ohio
- Assuming office December 15, 2026
- Succeeding: Jon Husted
- In office January 3, 2007 – January 3, 2025
- Preceded by: Mike DeWine
- Succeeded by: Bernie Moreno
Committee positions
Chair of the Senate Banking Committee
In office February 3, 2021 – January 3, 2025
Preceded by	Mike Crapo
Succeeded by	Tim Scott
Ranking Member of the Senate Banking Committee
In office January 3, 2015 – February 3, 2021
Preceded by	Mike Crapo
Succeeded by	Pat Toomey

Member of the U.S. House of Representatives from Ohio's 13th district
- In office January 3, 1993 – January 3, 2007
- Preceded by: Don Pease
- Succeeded by: Betty Sutton

46th Secretary of State of Ohio
- In office January 12, 1983 – January 14, 1991
- Governor: Dick Celeste
- Preceded by: Anthony J. Celebrezze Jr.
- Succeeded by: Bob Taft

Member of the Ohio House of Representatives from the 61st district
- In office January 3, 1975 – January 3, 1983
- Preceded by: Joan Douglass
- Succeeded by: Frank Sawyer

Personal details
- Born: Sherrod Campbell Brown; November 9, 1952 (age 74) Mansfield, Ohio, U.S.
- Party: Democratic
- Spouses: Larke Ummel (m. 1979; div. 1987); Connie Schultz (m. 2004)
- Children: 2
- Relatives: Charlie Brown (brother)
- Education: Yale University (BA); Ohio State University (MA, MPA)
- Website: Campaign website
- Brown's voice Brown supporting Lisa D. Cook for Federal Reserve Governor; Recorded May 10, 2022

Sherrod Campbell Brown (/ˈʃɛrəd/ SHERR-əd; born November 9, 1952) is an American politician who is a United States senator-elect from Ohio, a position he previously served in from 2007 to 2025. Prior to his tenure in the U.S. Senate, he served in the Ohio House of Representatives from 1975 to 1983, was Ohio secretary of state from 1983 to 1991, and was the U.S. representative for Ohio's 13th congressional district from 1993 to 2007. He is a member of the Democratic Party.

A native of Mansfield, Ohio, Brown graduated from Yale University and Ohio State University. Brown was first elected to the Senate in 2006, defeating two-term Republican incumbent Mike DeWine. He was reelected in 2012 and 2018. During his prior tenure, Brown chaired the Senate Committee on Banking, Housing, and Urban Affairs and served on the Committees on Finance, Veterans' Affairs, and Ethics.

Brown ran for reelection to a fourth term in 2024, but lost to Republican Bernie Moreno. He ran in the 2026 special election for Ohio's other Senate seat, defeating incumbent Jon Husted to re-enter the Senate, making the first person to return to the Senate since Jon Kyl in 2018. He will become the first person elected back to the Senate after previously losing re-election since Washington Republican Slade Gorton in 1988.

== Early life, education, and academic career ==
Sherrod Campbell Brown was born in Mansfield, Ohio, on November 9, 1952, the son of Emily (née Campbell) and Charles Gailey Brown, M.D. He has Scottish, Irish, German, and English ancestry, and was named after his maternal grandfather. He is one of three brothers. Brown's brother, Charlie, served as Attorney General of West Virginia from 1985 to 1989. Brown's other brother, Robert, was an attorney and graduate of Harvard Law School. Brown became an Eagle Scout in 1967; his badge was presented by John Glenn. In 1970, he graduated from Mansfield Senior High School.

In 1974, Brown received a Bachelor of Arts degree in Russian studies from Yale University. While at Yale, he lived in Davenport College, and he campaigned for George McGovern during the 1972 presidential election. He went on to receive a Master of Arts degree in education and a Master of Public Administration degree from the Ohio State University at Columbus in 1979 and 1981, respectively. He taught at Ohio State University's Mansfield branch campus from 1979 to 1981.

== Early political career ==
During his senior year in college, Brown was recruited by a local Democratic leader to run for Ohio's state house. Brown served as a state representative in Ohio from 1974 to 1982. At the time of his election to the Ohio House, he was the youngest person elected to that body. In 1982 Brown ran for Ohio secretary of state to succeed Anthony J. Celebrezze Jr. He won a four-way Democratic primary that included Dennis Kucinich, and then defeated Republican Virgil Brown in the general election. In 1986 Brown was reelected, defeating Vincent C. Campanella. As Secretary of State, Brown focused on voter registration outreach. In 1990 he lost reelection in a heated campaign against Republican Bob Taft, the future governor of Ohio and great-grandson of President William Howard Taft.

== U.S. House of Representatives ==
=== 1992 election ===
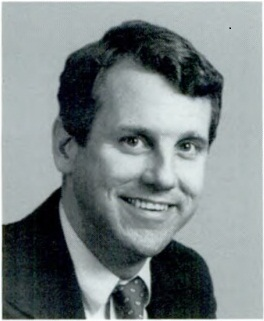
Brown in 1993

In 1992, Brown moved from Mansfield to Lorain, Ohio, and won a heavily contested Democratic primary for the open seat for Ohio's 13th district, in the western and southern suburbs of Cleveland, after eight-term incumbent Don Pease announced his retirement. The Democratic-leaning district gave him an easy win over the little-known Republican Margaret R. Mueller. He was reelected six times.

=== Tenure ===
The Democrats lost their long-held House majority in the 1994 elections, and stayed in the minority for the remainder of Brown's tenure. As ranking member of the Energy and Commerce Health subcommittee, Brown successfully advocated for increased funding to fight tuberculosis.

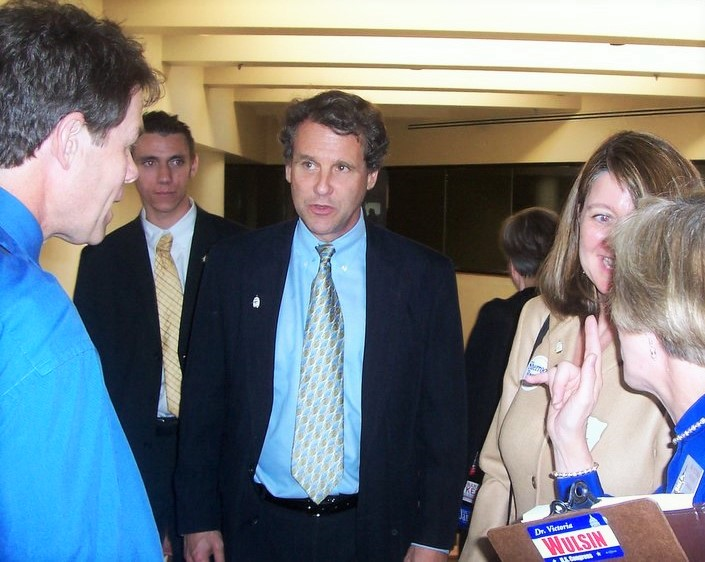
Brown in 2004

In 2005, Brown led the Democratic effort to block the Central American Free Trade Agreement (CAFTA). For many months, Brown worked as whip on the issue, securing Democratic "nay" votes and seeking Republican allies. After several delays, the House of Representatives finally voted on CAFTA after midnight on July 28, passing it by one vote.

Brown opposed an amendment to Ohio's constitution that banned same-sex marriage. He was also one of the few U.S. representatives to vote against the Defense of Marriage Act in 1996.

=== Committee assignments ===
Brown was the ranking minority member on the House Energy and Commerce Committee's Health Subcommittee. He also served on the Subcommittee on Telecommunications and the Internet and the Subcommittee on Commerce, Trade and Consumer Protection. While serving on the House International Relations Committee, he was also a member of the Subcommittee on Asia and the Pacific.

== U.S. Senate ==
=== Elections ===
==== 2006 ====
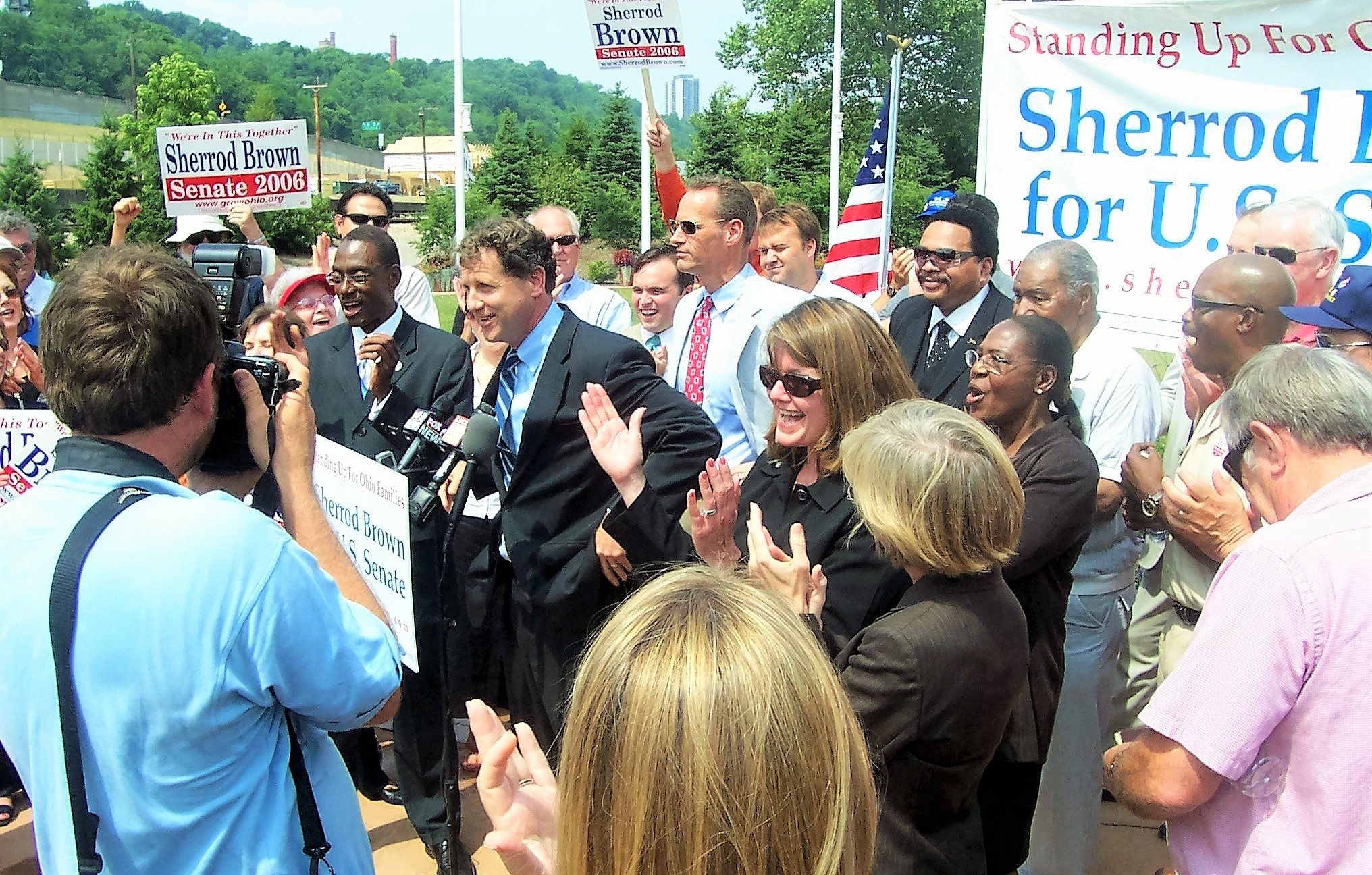
Brown at a campaign rally in 2006

In August 2005, Brown announced he would not run for the United States Senate seat held by two-term Republican incumbent Mike DeWine, but in October he reconsidered his decision. His announcement came shortly after Democrat Paul Hackett stated that he would soon announce his candidacy. In February 2006, Hackett withdrew from the race, all but ensuring that Brown would win the Democratic nomination. In the May primary Brown won 78.05% of the Democratic vote. His opponent, Merrill Samuel Keiser Jr., received 21.95%.

In April 2006, Brown, along with John Conyers, brought an action against George W. Bush

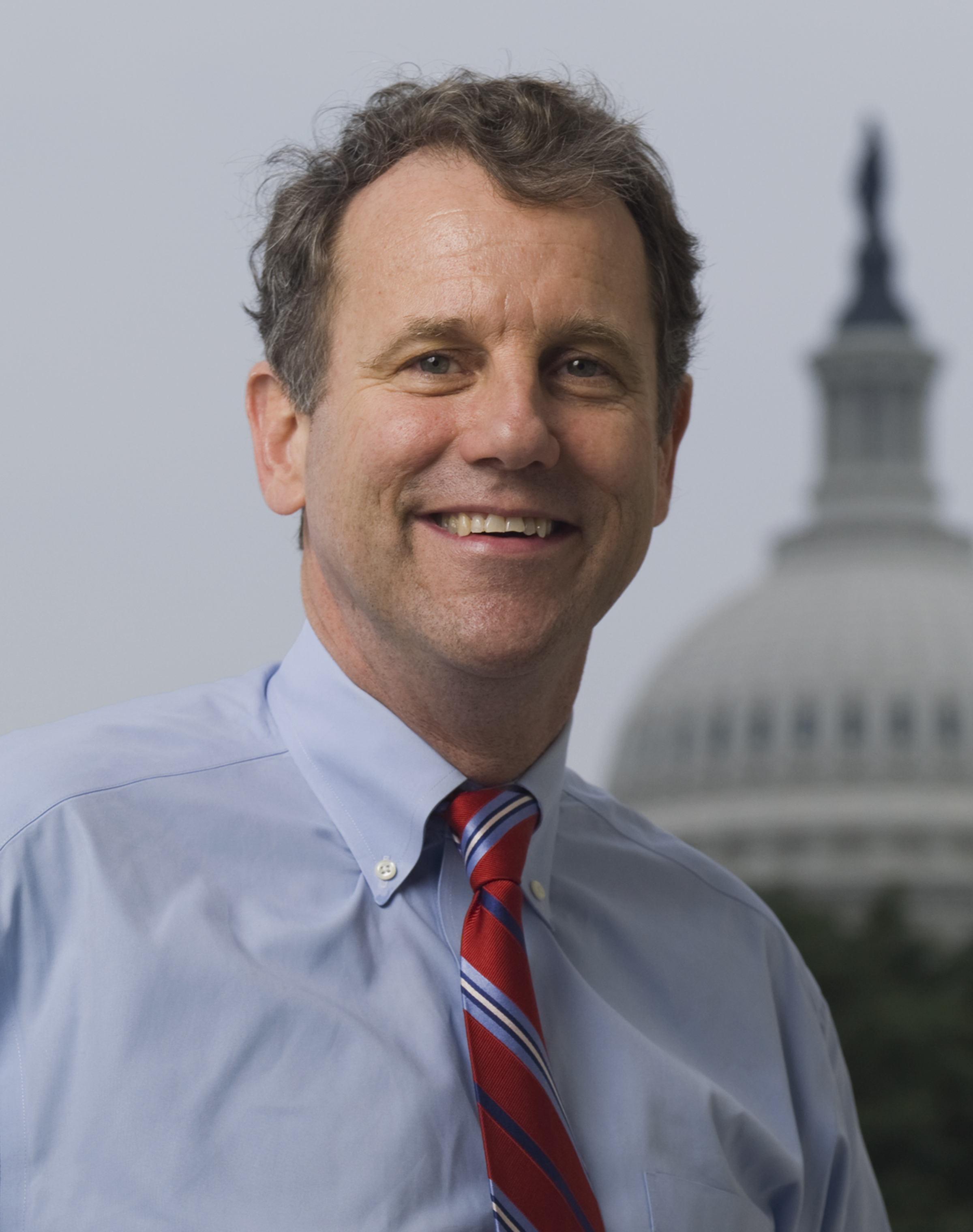
Official portrait, 2009

and others, alleging violations of the Constitution in the passage of the Deficit Reduction Act of 2005. The case, Conyers v. Bush, was ultimately dismissed for lack of standing.

On November 7, 2006, Brown defeated DeWine, 56.2% to 43.8%.

==== 2012 ====
2012 U.S. Senate election results in Ohio by county

Brown ran for reelection in 2012, facing opponent Josh Mandel, who in 2010 defeated the incumbent state treasurer by 14 points. Mandel raised $2.3 million in the second quarter of 2011 alone, to Brown's $1.5 million. Early on Brown enjoyed a steady lead in the polls. Mandel won the March Republican primary with 63% of the vote.

The Washington Post reported that no candidate running for reelection (save Barack Obama) faced more opposition from outside groups in 2012 than Brown did. By April 2012, $5.1 million had been spent on television ads opposing him, according to data provided by a Senate Democratic campaign operative. The United States Chamber of Commerce spent $2.7 million. 60 Plus Association, a conservative group that opposes health care reform, spent another $1.4 million. Karl Rove's Crossroads GPS and the Concerned Women for America Legislative Action Committee also spent heavily in the race. In May 2012, Brown campaigned with The West Wing actor Martin Sheen.

On November 6, 2012, Brown held his seat, winning 50.7% of the vote to Mandel's 44.7%. Independent candidate Scott Rupert received 4.6% of the vote.

==== 2018 ====
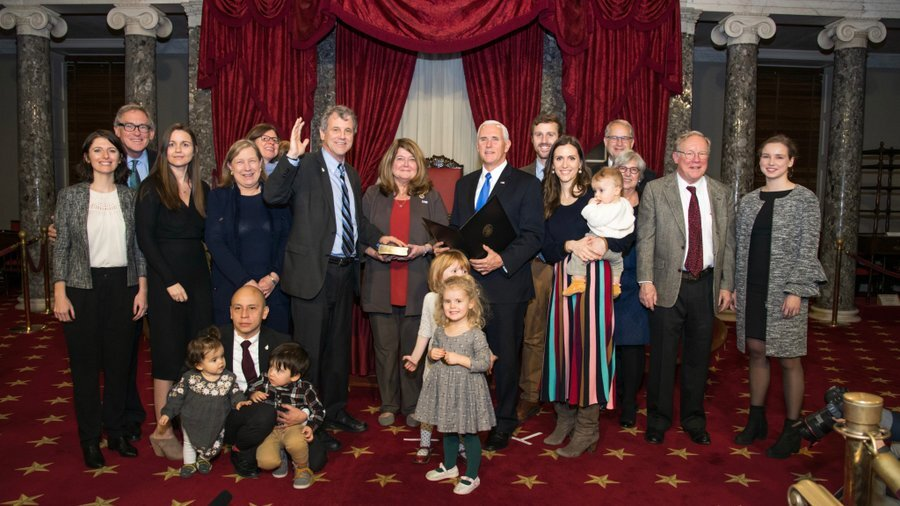
Brown being sworn into the Senate by Vice President Mike Pence in 2019 while surrounded by his family

In 2018, Brown was reelected to a third Senate term, defeating Republican U.S. representative Jim Renacci 53.4% to 46.6%.

==== 2024 ====
In 2024, Brown ran unopposed in the Democratic primary and in the general election faced the Republican nominee, businessman Bernie Moreno. Brown lost by 206,434 votes and earned 46.5% of the vote, to Moreno's 50.1%. Moreno's victory contributed to a Republican Senate majority in the 119th United States Congress.

==== 2026 ====
In August 2025, Brown announced his campaign for Ohio's Class III Senate seat in the 2026 special election to finish the term of Vice President JD Vance.

Brown won the May Democratic primary, and defeated the incumbent appointed Senator Jon Husted in the general election with 50% of the vote.

Brown has been the target of Russian interference in the 2026 U.S. Senate election in Ohio for his foreign policy.

=== Tenure ===
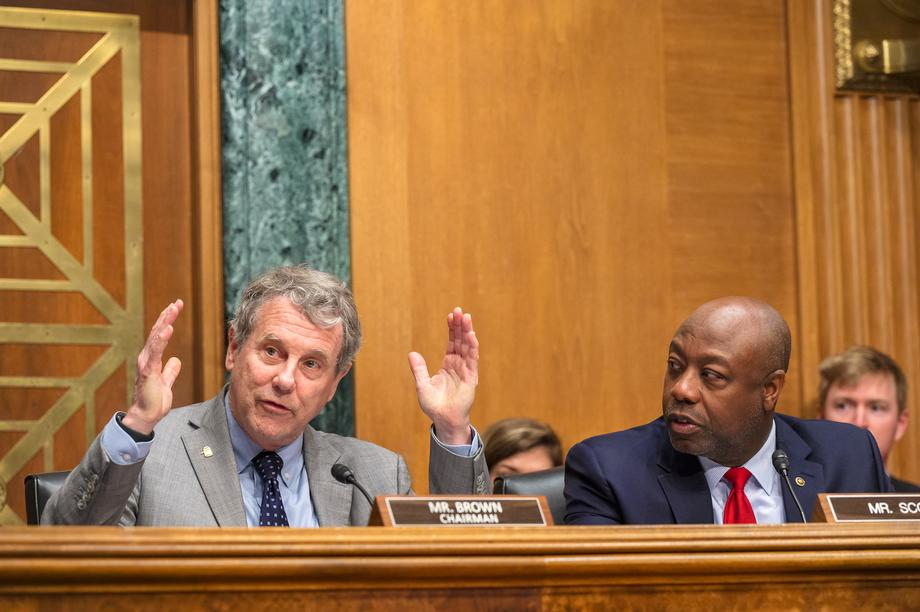
Brown chairing the Committee on Banking, Housing, and Urban Affairs in 2024

Brown is a staunch critic of free trade and has taken progressive stances on financial issues. He has pushed for the Democratic Party to adopt a more populist approach, focusing on issues affecting working-class Americans. He was appointed co-chair of the Joint Multiemployer Pension Solvency Committee in 2018.

At the start of the COVID-19 pandemic, Brown proposed a bill that would let workers immediately receive paid sick days, allowing them to stay home and self-quarantine if feeling sick or in the event of any public health emergency. Brown argued this would help slow the spread of the virus in workplaces. He criticized Republicans for blocking the proposal but thought that the House would pass similar measures.

After President Donald Trump was impeached in December 2019, Brown voted to remove him from office. During the January 2020 impeachment trial, he supported Republicans bringing witnesses to testify, so long as testimony from witnesses such as National Security Advisor John Bolton was also allowed.

Brown discusses the effect of his Buy America provision in the 2021 Infrastructure Bill.

Brown pushed for legislation in 2020 that would require the EPA to more strictly regulate perfluoroalkyl and polyfluoroalkyl substances. He and other Democrats voted also to block two pieces of anti-abortion legislation.

Brown pushed Defense Secretary Lloyd Austin in 2021 to establish the National Advanced Air Mobility Center of Excellence in Ohio.

He called in July 2024 for Joe Biden to withdraw from the 2024 United States presidential election.

=== Committee assignments (118th Congress) ===
- Committee on Agriculture, Nutrition, and Forestry
  - Subcommittee on Food and Nutrition, Specialty Crops, Organics, and Research
  - Subcommittee on Livestock, Dairy, Poultry, Local Food Systems, and Food Safety and Security
- Committee on Banking, Housing, and Urban Affairs (chair)
- Committee on Finance
  - Subcommittee on International Trade, Customs, and Global Competitiveness
  - Subcommittee on Social Security, Pensions, and Family Policy (chair)
- Committee on Veterans' Affairs

=== Caucus memberships ===
- Senate Taiwan Caucus

== Out of office (2025–2026) ==
After his defeat in the 2024 United States Senate election in Ohio and the end of his first tenure as Senator, Brown returned to private life. In his farewell speech, he promised to remain active in public life, and stated his departure was "not [...] the last time you will hear from me."

In January 2025, Harvard Kennedy School announced that Brown would be a Spring 2025 Visiting Fellow, and in March 2025, he launched the Dignity of Work Institute. Brown wrote an op-ed in The New Republic in March 2025, claiming that "Democrats Must Become the Workers' Party Again" and a guest essay in The New York Times entitled "What Worries Me Most About Trump’s Failing Economy" in April.

== Potential national campaigns ==
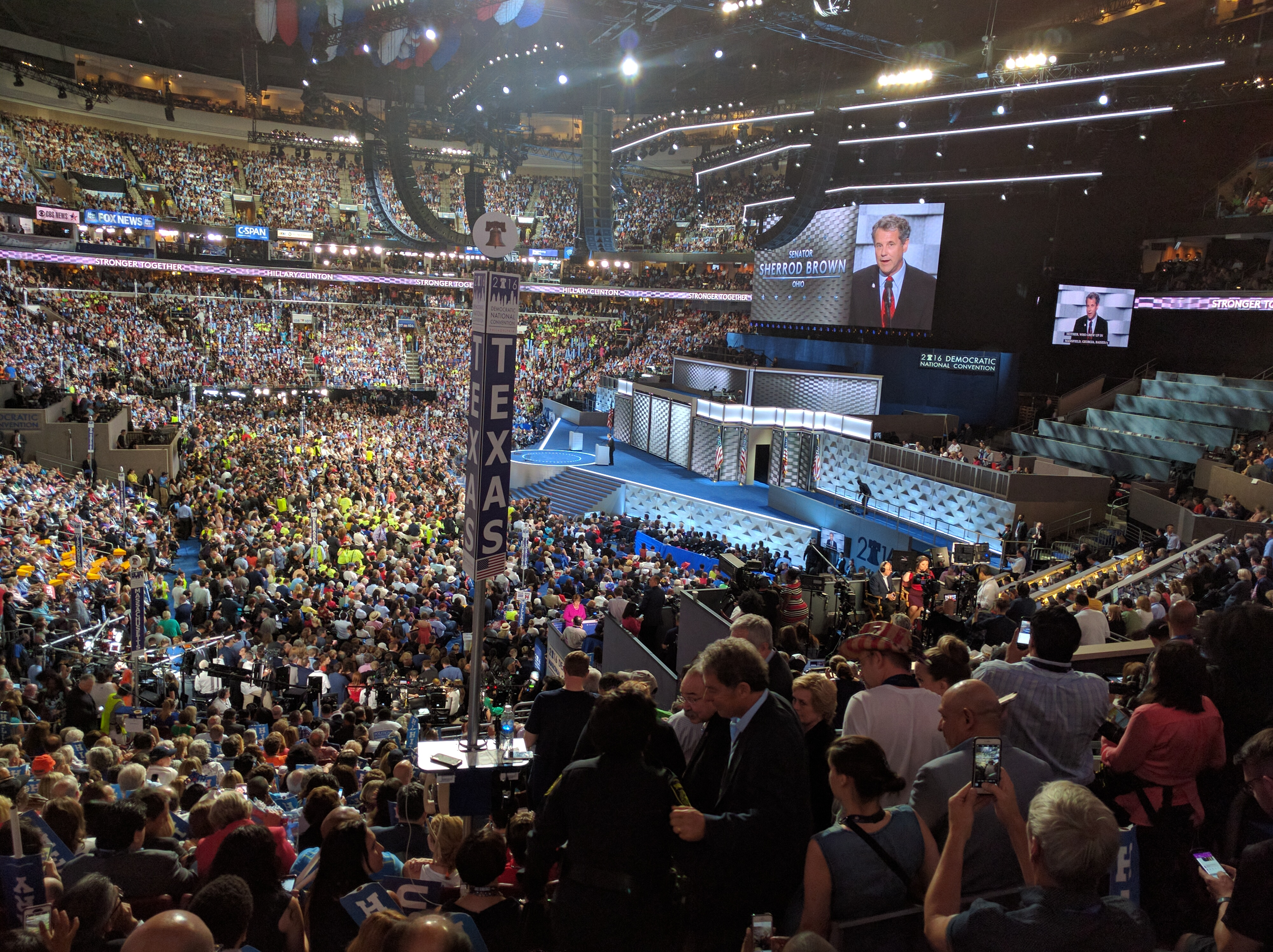
Brown speaks at the 2016 Democratic National Convention.

Despite being one of Vermont senator Bernie Sanders's closest allies in the U.S. Senate, Brown nevertheless endorsed former secretary of state Hillary Clinton and campaigned for her in the 2016 Democratic presidential primary in Ohio. During the 2016 campaign season, he said he had no interest in being vice president, but he was vetted as a potential vice-presidential running mate for Clinton. The choice came down to Brown and Virginia senator Tim Kaine, who was ultimately selected. Brown had the distinct disadvantage that had Clinton won, Ohio's Republican governor John Kasich would have chosen Brown's replacement in the Senate, whereas Kaine's replacement would be chosen by Democrat and Clinton ally Virginia governor Terry McAuliffe.

The Washington Monthly suggested in 2017 that Brown could unite the establishment and progressive wings of the Democratic Party as a presidential candidate in 2020. Cleveland.com reported in 2018 that he was "seriously" considering a presidential run. After winning his third Senate term in the 2018 election, he began exploring a run in January 2019 for the 2020 Democratic presidential nomination. He announced in March that he would not run for president and would instead remain a senator.

== Political positions ==
In the 2011 National Journal's annual rankings, Brown tied with eight other members for the title of the most liberal member of Congress. According to FiveThirtyEight, he voted with President Donald Trump's position on Congressional issues 25.8% of the time. During the 117th Congress, he voted with President Joe Biden's stated position 98% of the time.

In a 2017 issue of Dissent, Michael Kazin introduced an interview with Brown by praising him as "a politician ahead of his time" and "perhaps the most class-conscious Democrat in Washington." Brown told Kazin that many Ohioans think "people on the coasts look down on them" and blamed this notion on Fox News and The Wall Street Journal.

=== Artificial intelligence ===
Brown is a critic of data centers, saying "They eat up our land. They swallow up our water … then once they're built, our electricity prices go up" and "that the most powerful people in the United States do not have the interests of Ohioans at heart."

=== Education ===
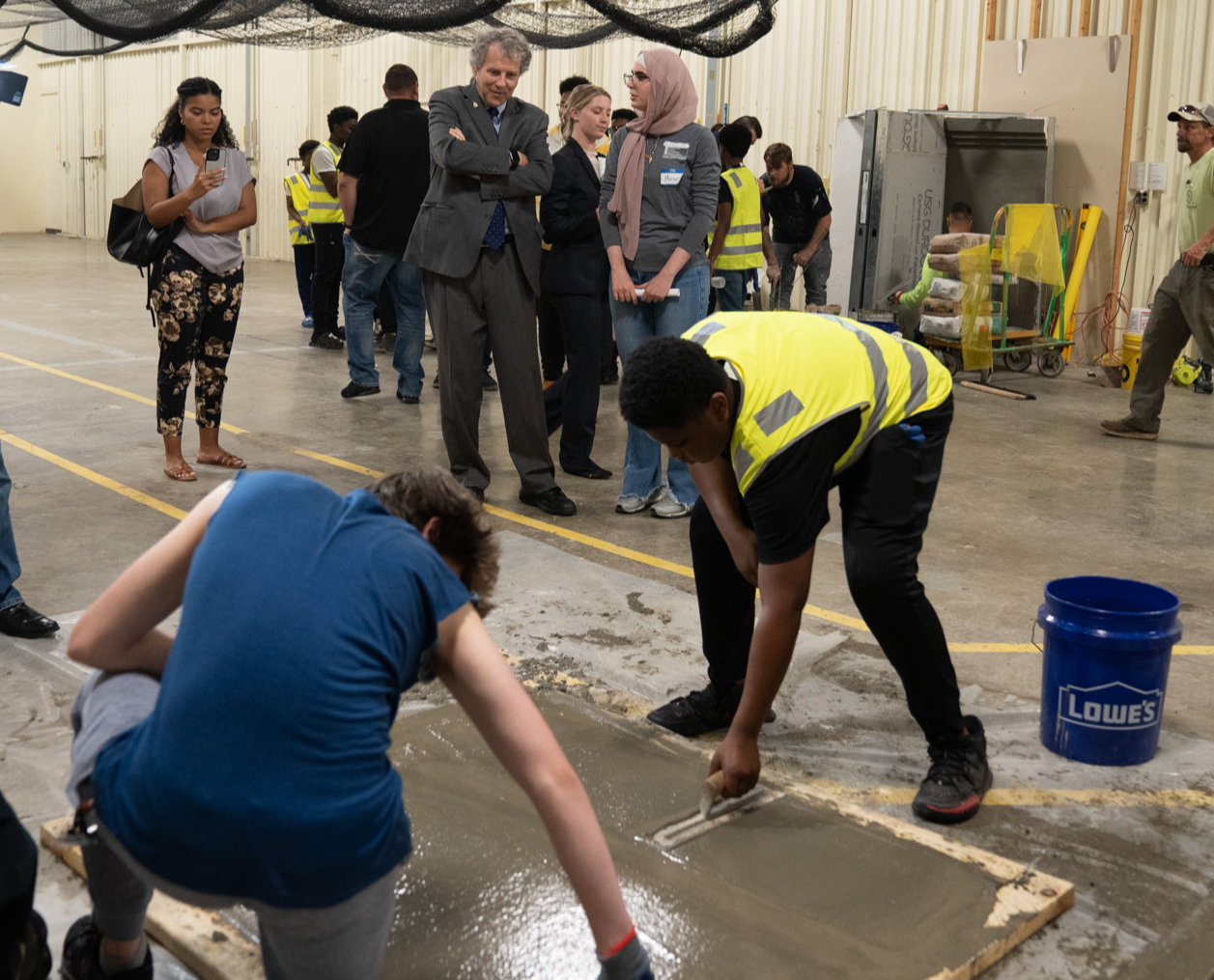
Brown's office works with local organizations to put on Summer Manufacturing Camps to connect young adults with real-world understanding of manufacturing.

Brown introduced the Charter School Accountability Act of 2015. The bill did not make it out of committee.

He praised West Virginia teachers who held a nine-day strike in early 2018.

=== Energy and environment ===
Brown co-sponsored the Responsible Electronics Recycling Act in 2012, a bill that would prohibit the export of some electronics for environmental reasons.

In the wake of the Flint water crisis, Brown announced plans to introduce legislation to force the federal government to step in when cities and states fail to warn residents about lead-contaminated drinking water. He called for the federal government to give Ohio's school districts money to test for lead in drinking water.

=== Health care ===
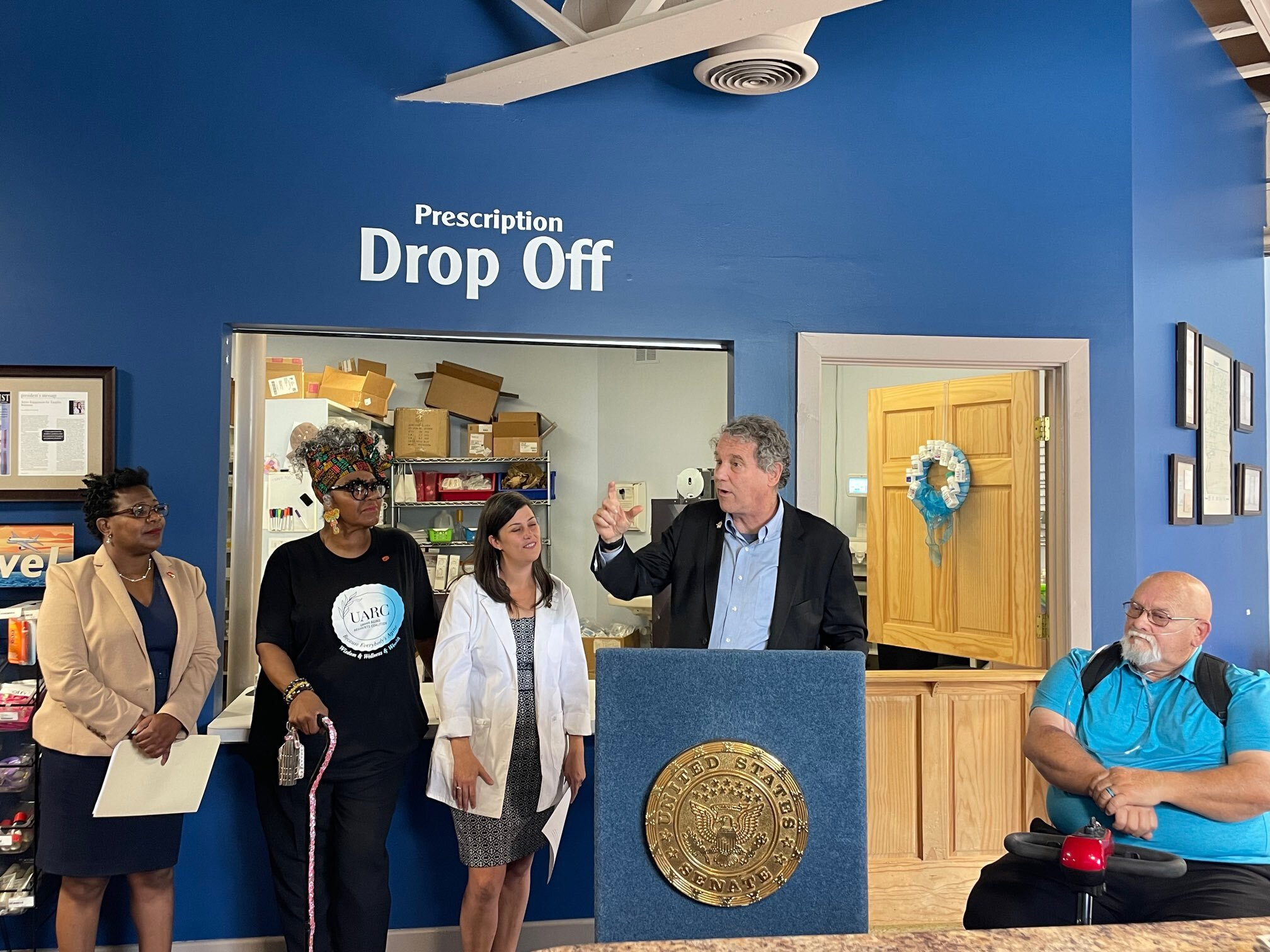
Brown discusses lowering prescription drug prices for people on Medicare.

Brown supported the Affordable Care Act, voting for it in 2009. He also voted for the Health Care and Education Reconciliation Act of 2010.

Brown co-sponsored the single-payer Expanded and Improved Medicare for All Act in 2006. In 2016, he did not co-sponsor Senator Bernie Sanders's single-payer health plan, despite saying he has "always been supportive" of such a system; Brown said he was supporting his own plan, which would allow people 55 and older to buy into Medicare.

Brown was one of six Democratic senators to introduce the American Miners Act of 2019, a bill to amend the Surface Mining Control and Reclamation Act of 1977 to swap funds in excess of the amount needed to meet existing obligations under the Abandoned Mine Land fund to the 1974 Pension Plan as part of an effort to prevent its insolvency as a result of coal company bankruptcies and the 2008 financial crisis. It also increased the Black Lung Disability Trust Fund tax and ensured that miners affected by the 2018 coal company bankruptcies would not lose their health insurance.

=== Housing ===
In July 2023, Brown was among a group of Democratic senators to introduce the Stop Predatory Investing Act to ban corporate investors that buy up more than 50 single-family homes from deducting interest or depreciation on those properties. In March 2024, Brown introduced the Yes in God's Backyard Act, a bill that would provide assistance to religious institutions aiming to build housing on their land.

=== LGBTQ rights ===
Brown voted against prohibiting same-sex couples from adopting children in Washington, D.C. in 1999. He received a 100% score from the Human Rights Campaign in 2005–2006, indicating a pro-gay rights stance. He voted in favor of the Don't Ask, Don't Tell Repeal Act of 2010.

In 2018 Brown was one of 20 senators to sign a letter to Secretary of State Mike Pompeo urging him to reverse the rolling back of a policy that granted visas to same-sex partners of LGBTQ diplomats who had unions that were not recognized by their home countries, writing that too many places around the world have seen LGBTQ individuals "subjected to discrimination and unspeakable violence, and receive little or no protection from the law or local authorities" and that refusing to let LGBTQ diplomats bring their partners to the US would be equivalent of upholding "the discriminatory policies of many countries around the world."

In 2022, Brown voted for the Respect for Marriage Act, a piece of which codified same-sex marriage rights into federal law.

=== Veterans ===
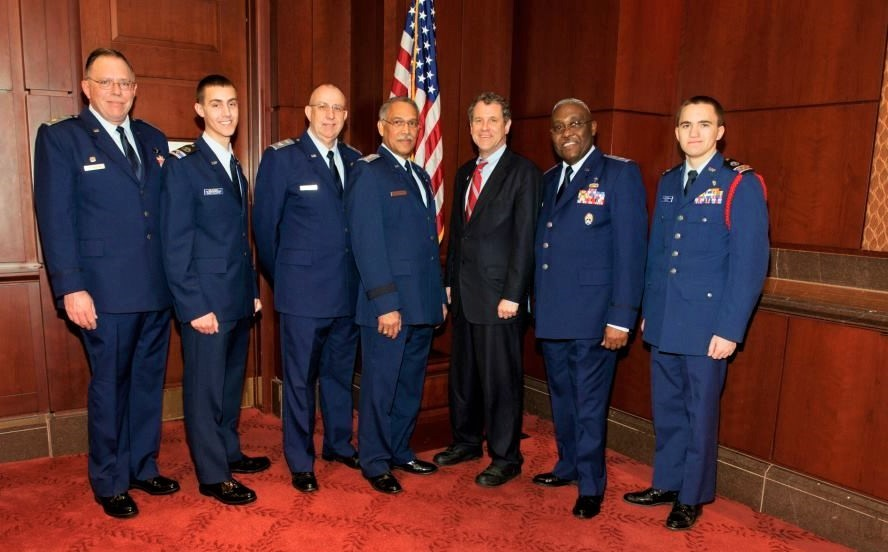
Ohio Wing Civil Air Patrol delegation with Brown in 2012

Brown sponsored the Gold Star Fathers Act of 2014, a bill that would expand preferred eligibility for federal jobs to the fathers of certain permanently disabled or deceased veterans.

Brown and Representative Tim Ryan introduced legislation in 2015 that would give military veterans priority in scheduling classes in colleges, universities, and other post-secondary education programs.

=== Banking and finance industry ===
After the leak of the Panama Papers in 2016, Brown and Elizabeth Warren urged the Treasury Department to investigate whether U.S. citizens were involved in possible tax avoidance and misconduct associated with the Panama-based law firm Mossack Fonseca.

Brown became the chair of the Senate Banking Committee in 2021, after having been its ranking Democratic member since 2015. In April of that year, he initiated an inquiry into "the implosion of Archegos Capital", an investment firm that lost billions of dollars amid accusations of fraud and insider trading.

=== Campaign finance ===
Brown has sponsored legislation to require corporate political action committees (PACs) to disclose their donors. When he was considering running for president in 2020, he pledged not to take donations from corporate PACs. He received $10.4 million in PAC money from 1997 to 2018. After not running for president, his Senate campaign committee and leadership PAC raised $1 million in corporate PAC donations. Some of the corporate PAC money Brown received came from health insurance and pharmaceutical companies which were being sued by the state of Ohio for illegally driving up drug prices.

=== Taxation and stimulus spending ===
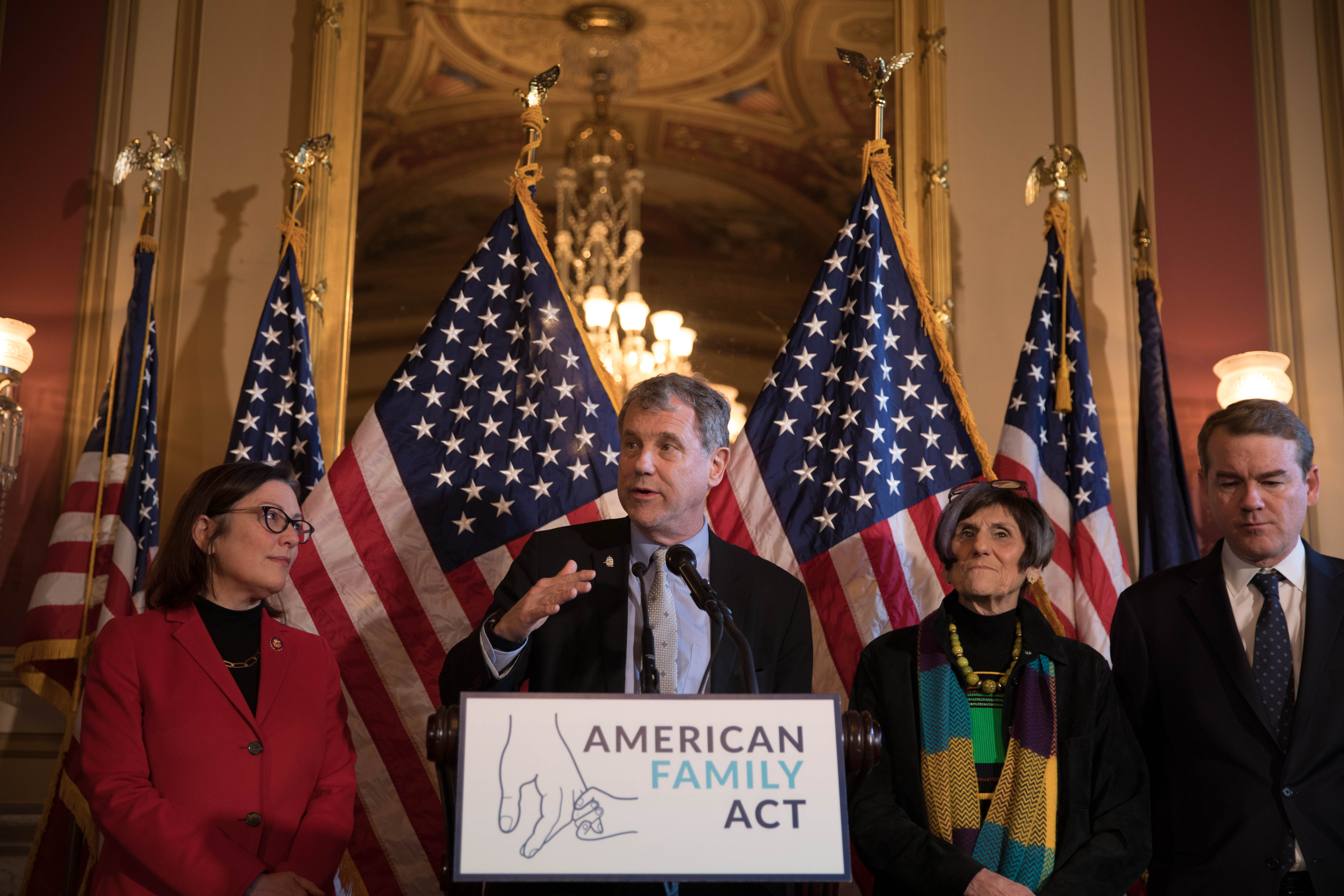
Brown speaks in support of the refundable child tax credit in 2019

Brown's opposition to the 2017 tax bill led to what was described as a "shouting match" with Senator Orrin Hatch, who accused Brown of "spouting off" to the effect that the tax bill benefited the rich.

Vice President Mike Pence criticized Brown for his 2018 vote against the Republican tax bill (the TCJA). Brown argued the bill overwhelmingly benefited wealthy individuals and corporations, with a much smaller impact on the middle class.

Brown voted for the American Recovery and Reinvestment Act of 2009.

=== Trade ===
Brown has criticized free trade with China and other countries. In a 2006 Washington Post article, he argued against free trade on the grounds that labor activism was responsible for the growth of the U.S. middle class, and that the U.S. economy is harmed by trade relations with countries that lack the kind of labor regulations that have resulted from that activism.

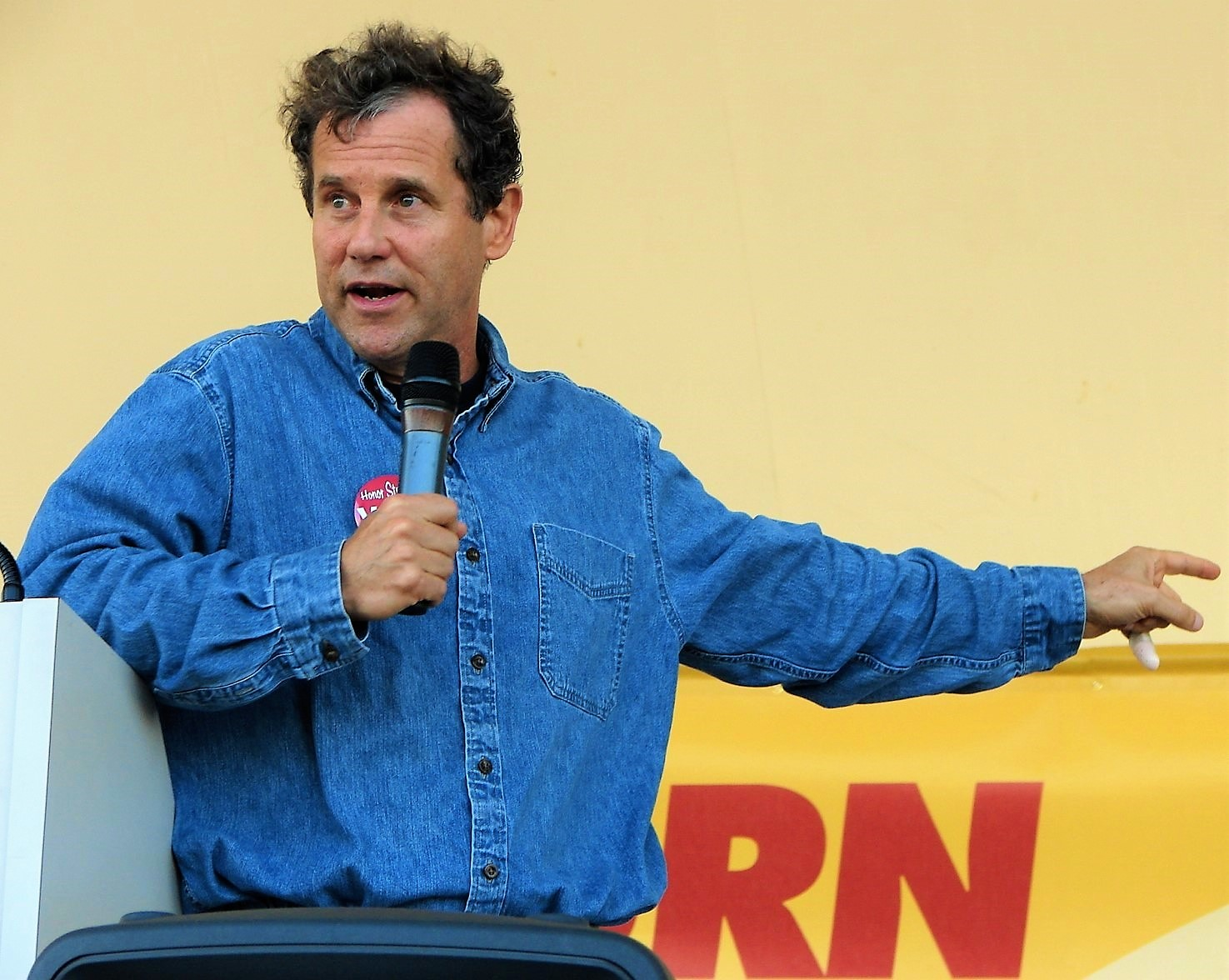
Brown speaks at 2008 Labor Day Festival.

The Columbus Dispatch wrote in 2011 that Brown "loves to rail against international trade agreements". In his book Myths of Free Trade, Brown writes, "an unregulated global economy is a threat to all of us" and recommends measures that would allow for emergency tariffs, protect Buy America laws, including those that give preference to minority and women-owned businesses, and hold foreign producers to American labor and environmental standards. Brown co-authored and sponsored a bill that would officially declare China a currency manipulator and require the Department of Commerce to impose countervailing duties on Chinese imports.

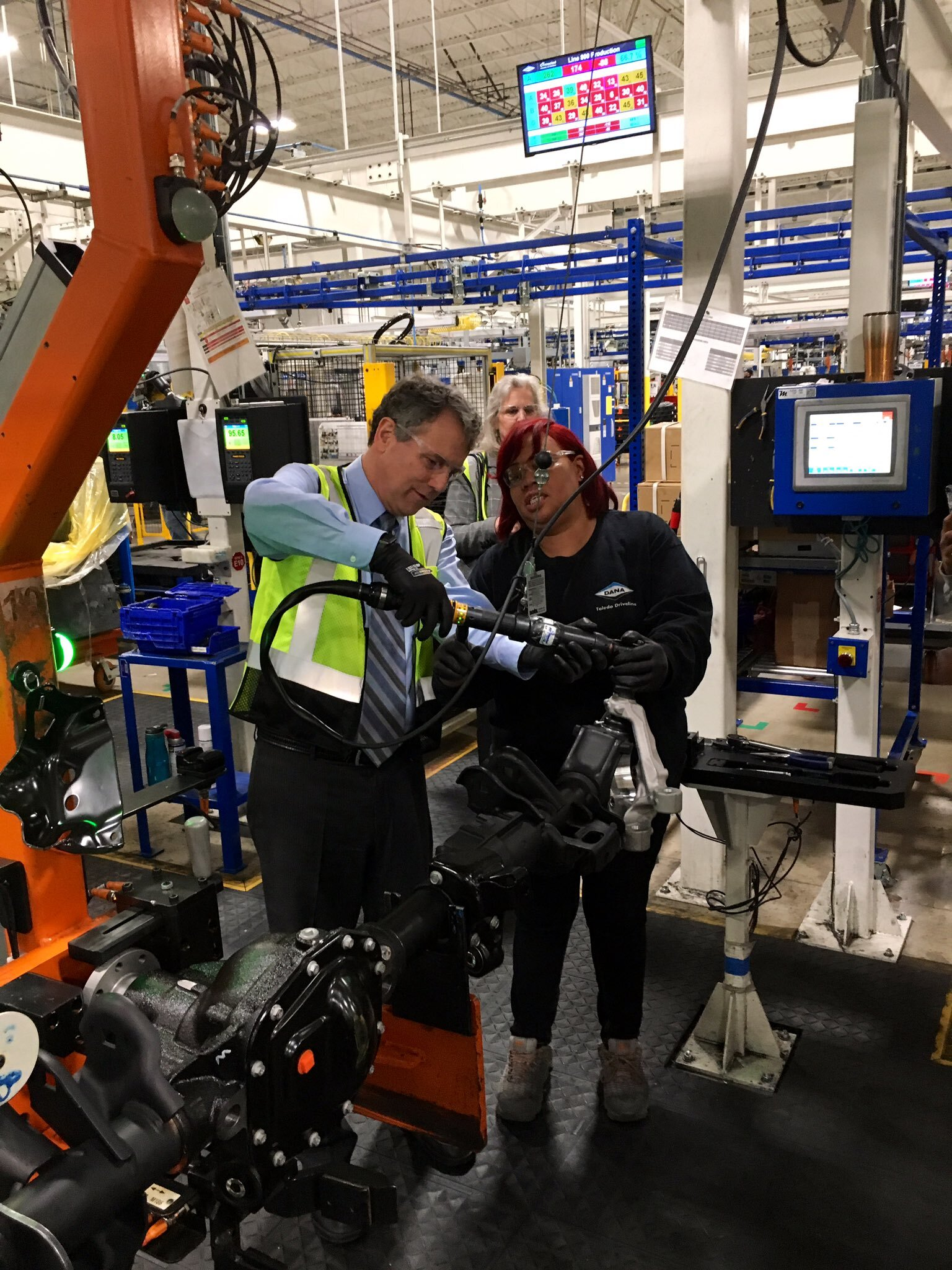
Brown visits the Dana driveline facility in Toledo.

Brown called for tariffs to be imposed on imports from China in 2016 and praised Hillary Clinton's plan to enforce rules and trade laws and triple the enforcement budgets at the United States Department of Commerce and the International Trade Commission.

Brown opposes NAFTA, which he argues should be renegotiated to aid Ohio workers. During its negotiation period, he introduced a resolution opposing the weakening of truck safety standards after NAFTA implementation. He supported President Trump's decision in 2018 to impose tariffs on washing machine imports. He supported his first trade agreement in 2019, having never previously supported one in Congress. He voted against the North American Free Trade Agreement because he said it would send Ohioan jobs to Mexico, but supported a new trade agreement for the U.S., Mexico, and Canada after a "step toward a pro-worker trade policy, but it's not a perfect agreement".

Pressure from Brown and other congressional Democrats in 2023 led the Biden administration to abandon plans for the Indo-Pacific Economic Framework's trade component.

=== Foreign policy ===
In his first sponsored congressional bill, Brown opposed the United States military presence in Somalia during the Somali Civil War.

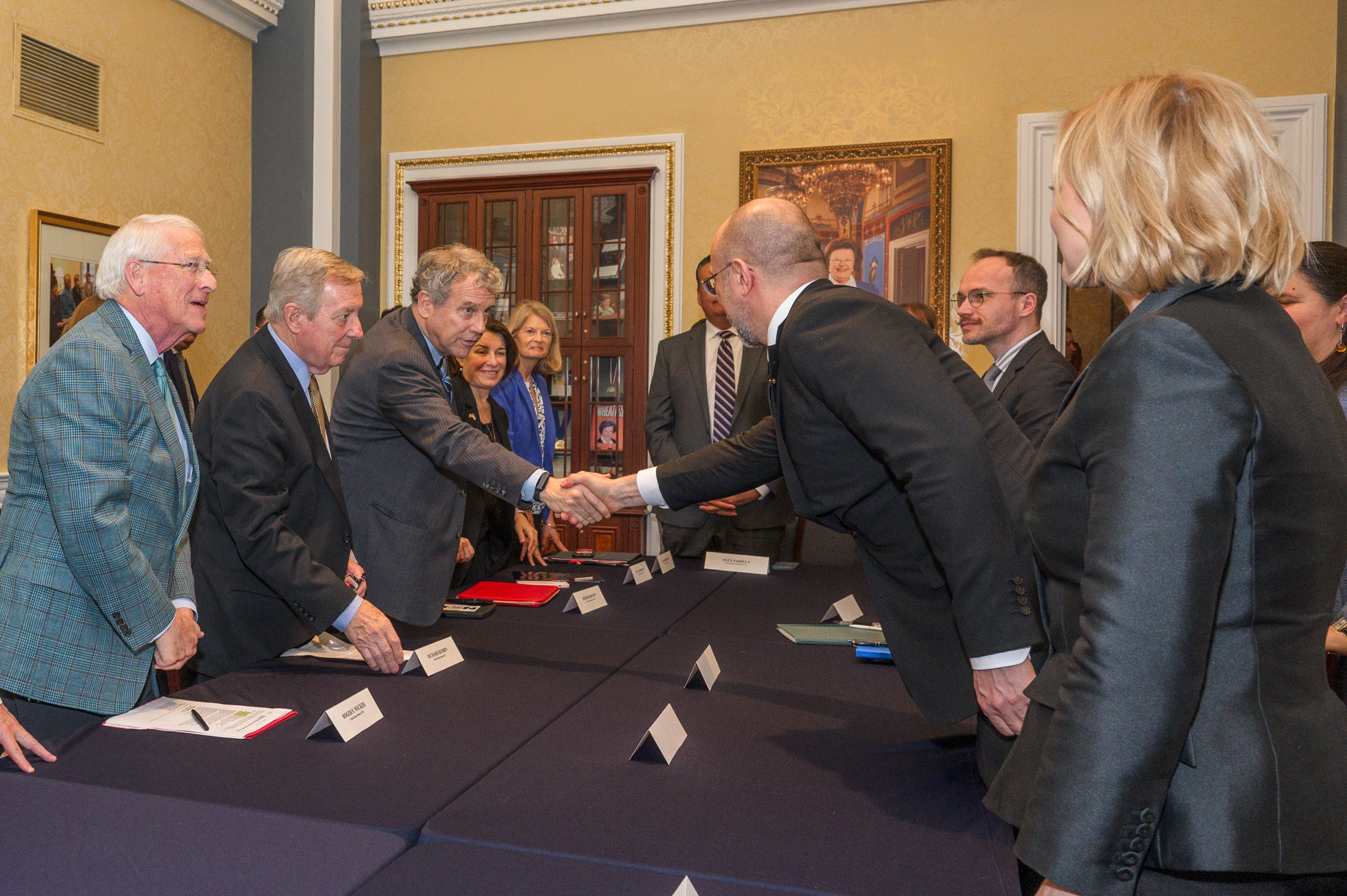
Brown meets with Ukrainian Prime Minister Denys Shmyhal in 2024.

Brown opposed the Iraq War and voted against the Iraq Resolution as a House Representative. He voted against the $87-billion war budgetary supplement and for redeploying U.S. troops out of Iraq by March 2008. Brown voted for the Supplemental Appropriations Act, 2008, which appropriated $250 billion for ongoing military operations and domestic programs.

Brown voted in 2010 for the ratification of New START, a nuclear arms reduction treaty between the U.S. and the Russian Federation obliging both countries to have no more than 1,550 strategic warheads and 700 launchers deployed during the next seven years, and providing for a continuation of on-site inspections that halted when START I expired the previous year. It was the first arms treaty with Russia in eight years.

Brown co-sponsored reaffirmations of the Taiwan Relations Act and the Six Assurances in regard to United States-Taiwan relations. Weeks after the 2014 Hong Kong class boycott campaign and Umbrella Movement broke out, demanding genuine universal suffrage among other goals, Brown (the chair of the Congressional-Executive Commission on China); co-chair Chris Smith; U.S. Senators Ben Cardin; Marco Rubio; Roger Wicker; Dianne Feinstein; and Jeff Merkley; and U.S. Representatives Nancy Pelosi, Dan Lipinski, and Frank Wolf introduced the Hong Kong Human Rights and Democracy Act, which would update the United States–Hong Kong Policy Act of 1992 and U.S. commitment to democratic development in Hong Kong.

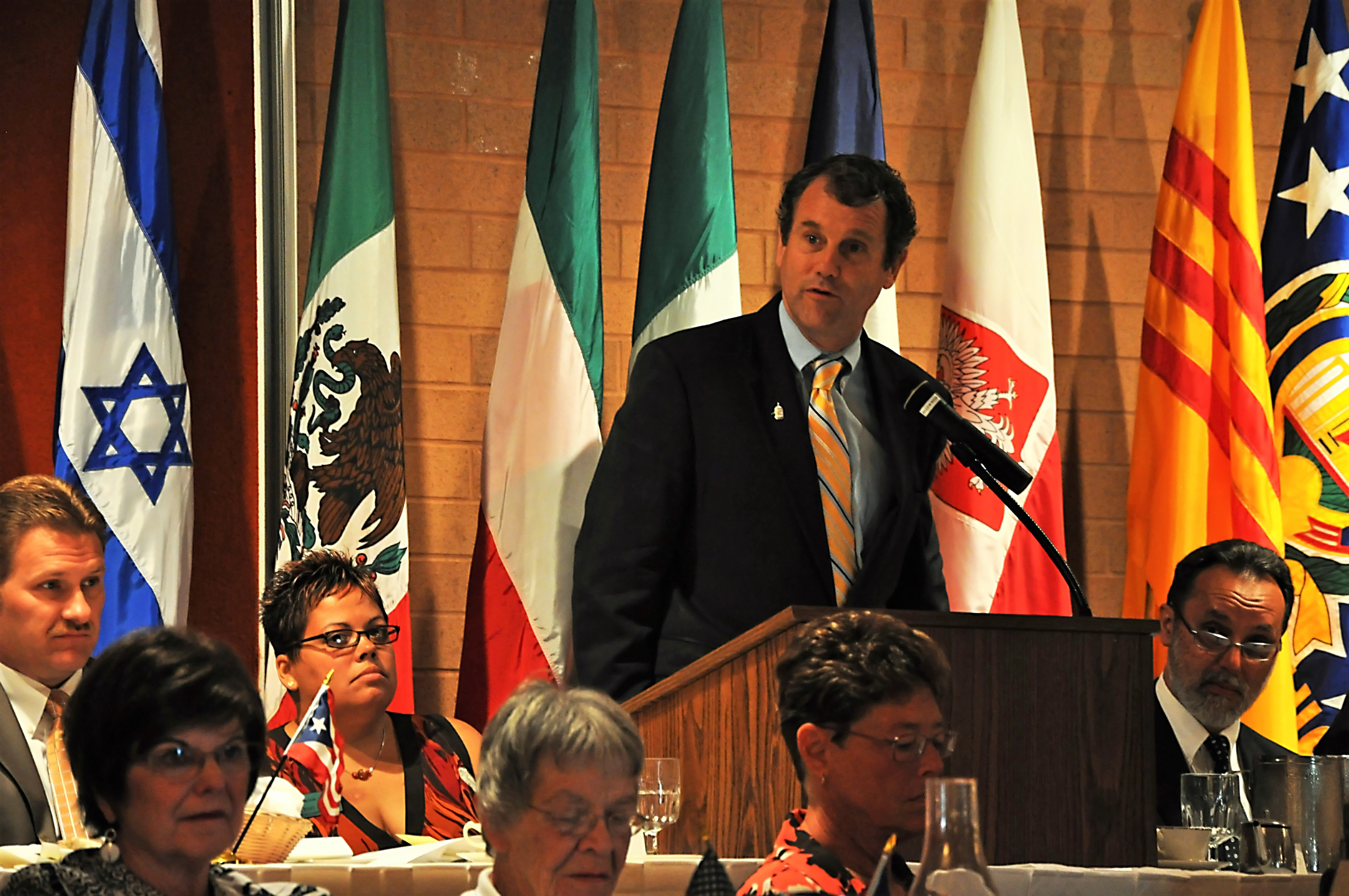
Brown speaks at the kickoff breakfast for Lorain International Festival.

Brown co-sponsored an amendment to the budget in 2015 that was unanimously approved by the Senate and that would reimpose sanctions on Iran if Iran violated the terms of the interim or final agreement by advancing its nuclear program.

In advance of the UN Security Council resolution 2334 of 2016 condemning Israeli settlements in the occupied Palestinian territories, Brown signed an AIPAC-sponsored letter urging President Obama to veto "one-sided" resolutions against Israel. He voted against a controversial Israel Anti-Boycott Act initiated by Republicans in 2019 that would allow states to prohibit government agencies from contracting with organizations involved in the Boycott, Divestment and Sanctions movement.

Brown criticized U.S. support for Saudi Arabia's military campaign in Yemen in 2017, saying, "It's becoming increasingly clear that Saudi Arabia has been deliberately targeting civilian targets. And that's absolutely unacceptable". He voted that same year for the Countering America's Adversaries Through Sanctions Act, which placed sanctions on Iran, Russia, and North Korea. Brown, Bob Menendez, and Mark Warner wrote to the inspectors general of the State Department, Treasury Department, and intelligence community in 2018 that the Trump administration failed to fully comply with the provisions of the CAATSA and requested an investigation. He condemned that year the genocide of the Rohingya Muslim minority in Myanmar and called for a stronger response to the crisis.

Brown was one of 12 senators to sign a letter to Trump in 2018 urging him not to withdraw from the Iran nuclear deal on the grounds that "Iran could either remain in the agreement and seek to isolate the United States from our closest partners, or resume its nuclear activities" if the U.S. pulled out and that both possibilities "would be detrimental to our national security interests." He and 16 other members of Congress urged that year the U.S. to impose sanctions under the Global Magnitsky Act against Chinese officials responsible for human rights abuses against the Uyghur Muslim minority in western China's Xinjiang region.

After Juan Guaidó was declared interim president of Venezuela by the National Assembly in 2019, Brown said the U.S. should "work with our allies and use economic, political and diplomatic leverage to help bring about free and fair elections, limit escalating tension, and ensure the safety of Americans on the ground", and called the Trump administration's suggestions of military intervention "reckless and irresponsible".

In 2024, Brown urged the Biden administration to recognize a "nonmilitarized" Palestinian state after the end of the Gaza war.

Brown is critical of the 2026 Iran war, and says it caused gas prices to rise.

=== Gun policy ===
Brown has criticized the political influence of gun manufacturers.

He called the Republican legislature in Ohio "lunatics" for introducing a concealed carry bill that would allow people to carry guns into airplane terminals (before security), police buildings, private airplanes, and day-care facilities.

In the wake of the Orlando nightclub shooting, Brown participated in the Chris Murphy gun control filibuster. A few weeks later, he voted for the Feinstein Amendment, which would have barred anyone on the terrorist watch list from buying a gun.

In response to the 2017 Las Vegas shooting, he supported Dianne Feinstein's effort to ban bump stocks.

=== Railroad safety ===
Brown was one of ten senators to cosponsor the Safe Freight Act in 2019, a bill requiring freight trains to have on board one or more certified conductors and a certified engineer who can collaborate on protecting the train and people living near the tracks. The legislation was meant to correct a Federal Railroad Administration rollback of a proposed rule intended to establish safety standards.

=== PATRIOT Act ===
Brown was one of 67 members of Congress who voted against the 2001 USA PATRIOT Act. In 2015, he co-sponsored a bill that would restrict ISIS's financing by authorizing new sanctions on foreign financial institutions that knowingly facilitate financial transactions with ISIS. The bill called for tightening international passport regulations and additional screening of people attempting to enter the U.S. on certain types of visas. The bill also provided grants to local law enforcement agencies to train for active shooter situations and terrorist attacks and to conduct cyber-training to identify and track extremists such as the couple behind the 2015 San Bernardino attack.

== Personal life ==
Brown was married to Larke Recchie from 1979 to 1987, and they had two children. During their divorce proceedings, Recchie obtained a restraining order against Brown to keep him from harassing or annoying her and from "doing bodily harm". In a supporting affidavit, she said she was "in fear for the safety and well-being of myself and our children due to [Brown's] physical violence and abusive nature" and that Brown had "intimidated, pushed, shoved and bullied" her on several occasions. Years later, Recchie walked back her claims of physical violence against Brown. Recchie hosted a fund-raising event for Brown's 2012 reelection campaign against Republican Josh Mandel and issued a statement saying, "I understand that in campaigns you often have to go after your opponent, but Josh Mandel should know better than to go after our family. I ask that he immediately put a stop to this kind of politics. I was proud to support Sherrod in 2006 and I'm proud to support him again this time around against Josh Mandel. Josh Mandel should immediately stop this kind of dirty campaigning."

Recchie and Cleveland Plain Dealer columnist Connie Schultz later became friends and filmed an ad together for Brown's 2006 Senate campaign. In 2004, Brown married Schultz. She resigned from her job in 2011, because being a politician's spouse presented a conflict of interest. She won a Pulitzer Prize in 2005. She is also the author of Life Happens (2007) and ...and His Lovely Wife (2008), in which she describes her experiences as the spouse of a U.S. Senate candidate. He has two stepchildren from this marriage.

Brown's daughter Elizabeth was president pro tempore of the Columbus City Council and served on the council for seven years. He has five grandchildren. He is ELCA Lutheran. Brown's brother, Charlie, is a former West Virginia attorney general.

In 2007, Brown was awarded an honorary doctorate from Capital University. He was awarded an honorary doctor of public service degree from Otterbein University in 2014. Along with his wife, Brown delivered a keynote address at the undergraduate commencement.

In June 2023, NBC News reported that Brown had been late paying his Cleveland property tax bill seven times, most recently in February, and that for years he claimed owner-occupant tax credits on properties in two different Ohio counties. Brown subsequently paid the delinquent tax bill and repaid Franklin County for the tax credit. His campaign said he would not claim it in future years. In August 2023, Brown corrected several years of Senate financial disclosure forms that had previously omitted his wife's pension money.

== Bibliography ==
Brown is the author of three books:

- Congress from the Inside: Observations from the Majority and the Minority, Kent State University Press, 2004, ISBN 978-0873387927
- Myths of Free Trade: Why American Trade Policy Has Failed, The New Press, 2006, ISBN 978-1595581242
- Desk 88: Eight Progressive Senators Who Changed America, Farrar, Straus & Giroux, 2019, ISBN 978-0374138219

== Electoral history ==
Democratic primary results, Ohio's 13th congressional district election, 2004
Party	Candidate	Votes	%
Democratic	Sherrod Brown (incumbent)	69,455	100.00
Total votes		69,455	100.00

Ohio's 13th congressional district election, 2004
Party	Candidate	Votes	%
Democratic	Sherrod Brown (incumbent)	201,004	67.43
Republican	Robert Lucas	97,090	32.57
Total votes		298,094	100
Democratic hold			

Democratic primary results, Ohio 2006
Party	Candidate	Votes	%
Democratic	Sherrod Brown	583,776	78.11%
Democratic	Merrill Kesier Jr.	163,628	21.89%
Total votes		747,404	100.00

2006 United States Senate election in Ohio
Party	Candidate	Votes	%	±%
Democratic	Sherrod Brown	2,257,369	56.16%	+20.0
Republican	Mike DeWine (incumbent)	1,761,037	43.82%	−15.8
Independent	Richard Duncan	830	0.02%	n/a
Majority		452,690	12.34%	
Turnout		4,019,236	53.25%	
Democratic gain from Republican		Swing	-17.9	

Democratic primary results, Ohio 2012
Party	Candidate	Votes	%
Democratic	Sherrod Brown (incumbent)	802,678	100.00
Total votes		802,678	100.00

2012 United States Senate election in Ohio
Party	Candidate	Votes	%	±%
Democratic	Sherrod Brown (incumbent)	2,762,766	50.70%	−5.46%
Republican	Josh Mandel	2,435,744	44.70%	+0.88%
Independent	Scott Rupert	250,618	4.60%	N/A
Total votes		5,449,128	100.0%	N/A
Democratic hold				

Democratic primary results, Ohio 2018
Party	Candidate	Votes	%
Democratic	Sherrod Brown (incumbent)	613,373	100%
Total votes		613,373	100%

2018 United States Senate election in Ohio
Party	Candidate	Votes	%	±%
Democratic	Sherrod Brown (incumbent)	2,358,508	53.40%	+2.70%
Republican	Jim Renacci	2,057,559	46.58%	+1.88%
Write-in		1,012	0.02%	N/A
Total votes		4,410,898	100.00%	N/A
Democratic hold				

2024 United States Senate election in Ohio
Party	Candidate	Votes	%	±%
Republican	Bernie Moreno	2,857,383	50.09%	+3.51%
Democratic	Sherrod Brown (incumbent)	2,650,949	46.47%	−6.93%
Libertarian	Don Kissick	195,648	3.43%	N/A
Write-in		640	0.01%	-0.01%
Total votes		5,704,620	100.00%	
Republican gain from Democratic				

== See also ==
- List of United States senators from Ohio
- Ohio United States Senate elections

Party political offices
Preceded by Anthony J. Celebrezze Jr.	Democratic nominee for Secretary of State of Ohio; 1982, 1986, 1990	Succeeded by Dan Brady
Preceded by Ted Celeste	Democratic nominee for U.S. Senator from Ohio (Class 1); 2006, 2012, 2018, 2024	Most recent
Preceded by Tim Ryan	Democratic nominee for U.S. Senator from Ohio (Class 3); 2026	Most recent
Political offices
Preceded by Tony Celebrezze	Secretary of State of Ohio; 1983–1991	Succeeded by Bob Taft
U.S. House of Representatives
Preceded by Don Pease	Member of the U.S. House of Representatives from Ohio's 13th congressional district 1993–2007	Succeeded by Betty Sutton
U.S. Senate
Preceded by Mike DeWine	U.S. Senator (Class 1) from Ohio; 2007–2025; Served alongside: George Voinovich, Rob Portman, JD Vance	Succeeded by Bernie Moreno
Preceded by Jon Husted	U.S. Senator (Class 3) from Ohio; Taking office 2026; Served alongside: Bernie Moreno	Elect
Preceded by Chris Smith	Chair of the Joint China Commission; 2013–2015	Succeeded by Chris Smith
Preceded by Mike Crapo	Ranking Member of the Senate Banking Committee; 2015–2021	Succeeded by Mike Crapo
New office	Vice Chair of the Joint Pensions Committee; 2018–2019	Position abolished
Preceded by Mike Crapo	Chair of the Senate Banking Committee; 2021–2025	Succeeded by Tim Scott
U.S. order of precedence (ceremonial)
Preceded by Richard Burr as former U.S. Senator	Order of precedence of the United States as former U.S. Senator	Succeeded by John Breaux as former U.S. Senator
