= 2006 United States Senate election in Ohio =

- November 7, 2006
- Turnout: 53.25% (registered voters) ▼10.40pp
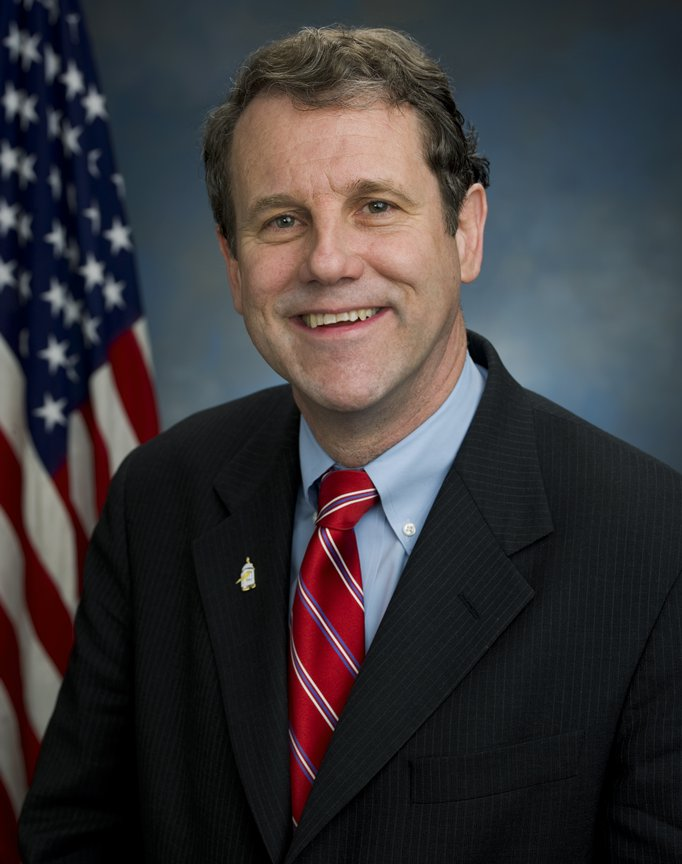

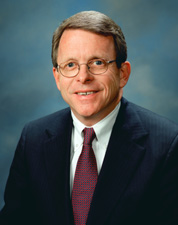
Nominee	Sherrod Brown	Mike DeWine
Party	Democratic	Republican
Popular vote	2,257,485	1,761,092
Percentage	56.16%	43.82%
- Brown: 50–60% 60–70% 70–80% 80–90% >90% DeWine: 50–60% 60–70% 70–80% 80–90% >90% Tie: 50%
U.S. senator before election
Mike DeWine
Republican
Elected U.S. Senator
Sherrod Brown
Democratic

The 2006 United States Senate election in Ohio was held on November 7, 2006. Incumbent Republican Mike DeWine ran for re-election, but was defeated by Democratic Congressman Sherrod Brown. As of 2026, this is the most recent time a Democratic Senate candidate in Ohio won a race by double digits. This was also the last time an incumbent senator lost reelection in Ohio, until Brown was defeated in 2024 by Bernie Moreno.

To date, this is Mike DeWine's second general election loss of his political career, following his 1992 loss to John Glenn. Following his defeat, DeWine served as Ohio's state attorney general from 2011 to 2019, and has been the state's governor since 2019.

== Background ==
The incumbent Republican Senator R. Michael DeWine had approval ratings at 38%, making him the second most unpopular U.S. senator behind Pennsylvania Republican Rick Santorum, who was also up for reelection in 2006. Pre-election stories in the U.S. media suggested that the national Republican Party might have given up on saving Senator DeWine's Senate seat before election day. Sherrod Brown, former Ohio secretary of state and U.S. representative from Ohio's 13th district, easily won the Democratic nomination over Merrill Keiser Jr.

== Republican primary ==
=== Candidates ===
- Mike DeWine, incumbent U.S. senator since 1995
- William G. Pierce, engineer
- David Smith, candidate for U.S. representative from Ohio's 2nd congressional district in 2005

=== Campaign ===
Both candidates campaigned as conservative alternatives to DeWine, citing DeWine's support for gun control measures and his role as a member of the Gang of 14, a group of Republicans who compromised with Democrats in a dispute about judicial appointments.

=== Results ===
Republican primary results
Party	Candidate	Votes	%
Republican	Mike DeWine (incumbent)	565,580	71.71%
Republican	David Smith	114,186	14.48%
Republican	William Pierce	108,978	13.82%
Total votes		788,744	100.00%

== Democratic primary ==
=== Candidates ===
==== Declared ====
- Sherrod Brown, U.S. representative from Lorain
- Merrill Keiser Jr., trucking business owner/operator and Vietnam War veteran

==== Withdrew ====
- Paul Hackett, Iraq War veteran

=== Results ===
Democratic primary results
Party	Candidate	Votes	%
Democratic	Sherrod Brown	583,776	78.11%
Democratic	Merrill Keiser Jr.	163,628	21.89%
Total votes		747,404	100.00%

== General election ==
=== Candidates ===
- Sherrod Brown, U.S. representative from Lorain (Democratic)
- Mike DeWine, incumbent senator since 1995 (Republican)
- Richard Duncan (Independent) (write-in)

=== Campaign ===
The Republican Party, which was facing multiple challenges to their Senate majority, was initially determined to assist DeWine in his competitive race, while the National Democratic party supported Brown in hopes of taking control of the Senate. John McClelland, a spokesman for the Ohio Republican Party, said, "It's vitally important to the Republican Party as a whole, so I think that's why you see the president coming to Ohio to support Mike DeWine." Phil Singer, a spokesman for the Democratic Senatorial Campaign Committee, said, "Mike DeWine Senior is in for the fight of his life, make no mistake about it."

On July 14, 2006, DeWine's campaign began airing TV commercials depicting a smoking World Trade Center. "The senator was notified... by a reporter at U.S. News & World Report that the image of the burning Twin Towers could not have depicted the actual event because the smoke was blowing the wrong way." DeWine's campaign admitted that the video was actually a still photo of the World Trade Center with smoke digitally added. He was also criticized for using an emotionally charged image to attack his challenger.

Another of DeWine's ads suggested that opponent Sherrod Brown did not pay his taxes for thirteen years. This claim led to the Associated Press reporting on October 19 that "Several Ohio television stations have stopped airing a Republican ad because state documents contradict the ad's accusation that Democratic U.S. Senate candidate Sherrod Brown didn't pay an unemployment tax bill for 13 years." Brown produced a commercial citing these facts. DeWine's ads were changed to state only that he had failed to pay his unemployment taxes until legal action was taken against him.

On October 16, 2006, The New York Times reported that top national Republicans were moving resources away from the Ohio Senate race, as they had determined that DeWine was likely to lose, and wanted to spend money on races where Republican candidates were seen as having a better chance of winning.

=== Debates ===
- Complete video of debate, October 1, 2006
- Complete video of debate, October 13, 2006
- Complete video of debate, October 19, 2006
- Complete video of debate, October 27, 2006

=== Fundraising ===
During the election cycle, DeWine raised $14.9 million and spent $15.5 million. Brown raised $8.9 million and spent $10.8 million.

=== Predictions ===
Source	Ranking	As of
The Cook Political Report	Lean D (flip)	November 6, 2006
Sabato's Crystal Ball	Likely D (flip)	November 6, 2006
Rothenberg Political Report	Likely D (flip)	November 6, 2006
Real Clear Politics	Lean D (flip)	November 6, 2006

=== Polling ===
Source	Date	Sherrod Brown (D)	Mike DeWine (R)
Zogby	October 31, 2005	40%	37%
Rasmussen	December 2, 2005	41%	43%
Rasmussen	January 7, 2006	40%	45%
Rasmussen	February 18, 2006	37%	46%
Rasmussen	March 31, 2006	42%	45%
Zogby/WSJ	March 31, 2006	46%	37%
Rasmussen	April 24, 2006	41%	43%
Mason-Dixon	April 26, 2006	36%	47%
Rasmussen	May 15, 2006	44%	41%
University of Cincinnati	May 25, 2006	42%	52%
Survey USA	June 13, 2006	48%	39%
Zogby/WSJ	June 21, 2006	47%	34%
Rasmussen	June 27, 2006	39%	46%
Columbus Dispatch	July 23, 2006	45%	37%
Zogby/WSJ	July 24, 2006	45%	37%
Rasmussen	August 1, 2006	44%	42%
SurveyUSA	August 5, 2006	49%	41%
Rasmussen	August 26, 2006	45%	42%
Zogby/WSJ	August 28, 2006	47%	39%
Gallup	September 5, 2006	46%	40%
Zogby/WSJ	September 11, 2006	45%	41%
Rasmussen	September 13, 2006	47%	41%
Quinnipiac	September 20, 2006	45%	44%
University of Cincinnati	September 20, 2006	51%	47%
SurveyUSA	September 21, 2006	52%	42%
Columbus Dispatch	September 24, 2006	47%	42%
Zogby/WSJ	September 28, 2006	45%	41%
University of Akron	September 29, 2006	42%	42%
Mason-Dixon	October 1, 2006	45%	43%
Reuters/Zogby	October 5, 2006	41%	41%
Rasmussen	October 5, 2006	49%	41%
SurveyUSA	October 12, 2006	54%	40%
Rasmussen	October 13, 2006	48%	42%
Quinnipiac	October 17, 2006	53%	41%
University of Cincinnati	October 17, 2006	52%	45%
CBS News/New York Times	October 17, 2006	49%	35%
Mason-Dixon/MSNBC	October 24, 2006	48%	40%
Los Angeles Times/Bloomberg	October 24, 2006	47%	39%
Rasmussen	October 26, 2006	53%	41%
SurveyUSA	October 26, 2006	57%	37%
Opinion Consultants	October 22–30, 2006	51%	44%
CNN/Opinion Research Corporation	October 31, 2006	54%	43%
Reuters/Zogby International	November 2, 2006	56%	42%
Rasmussen	November 4, 2006	54%	43%
Mason-Dixon/MSNBC-McClatchy	November 5, 2006	50%	44%
Columbus Dispatch	November 5, 2006	62%	38%
University of Cincinnati Ohio Poll	November 6, 2006	56%	44%
SurveyUSA	November 6, 2006	54%	42%

=== Results ===
Brown was declared the winner right when the polls closed in Ohio at 7:30. DeWine had the second worst performance of a Republican incumbent in 2006; only Pennsylvania Senator Rick Santorum had a worse performance. While DeWine was able to win rural counties in western Ohio, Brown managed to win most eastern Ohio counties, especially in heavily populated areas. DeWine's narrow 2,000 vote victory in Hamilton County, which is home to Cincinnati, did not come close to making a dent in Brown's lead.

Brown would be reelected to a second term in 2012, and a third term in 2018. Also in 2018, both Brown and DeWine were on the ballot, but this time for different races; DeWine would be elected governor of Ohio. In 2024, Brown would be defeated for reelection.

2006 United States Senate election in Ohio
Party	Candidate	Votes	%	±%
Democratic	Sherrod Brown	2,257,485	56.16%	+20.29
Republican	Mike DeWine (incumbent)	1,761,092	43.82%	−16.08
Independent	Richard Duncan (write-in)	830	0.02%	N/A
Total votes		4,019,407	100.00%	N/A
Democratic gain from Republican				

==== By county ====
County	Sherrod Brown Democratic		Mike DeWine Republican		Richard Duncan Independent		Margin		Total votes cast
County	#	%	#	%	#	%	#	%	Total votes cast
Adams	3,903	45.54%	4,667	54.46%	0	0.00%	-764	-8.92%	8,570
Allen	16,597	45.95%	19,521	54.04%	5	0.01%	-2,924	-8.09%	36,123
Ashland	8,890	46.31%	10,299	53.65%	9	0.04%	-1,409	-7.34%	19,198
Ashtabula	21,151	61.79%	13,078	38.21%	1	0.00%	8,073	23.58%	34,230
Athens	13,988	70.55%	5,839	29.45%	0	0.00%	8,149	41.10%	19,827
Auglaize	6,845	40.28%	10,142	59.68%	8	0.04%	-3,297	-19.40%	16,995
Belmont	15,490	65.76%	8,056	34.20%	10	0.04%	7,434	31.56%	23,556
Brown	6,850	48.57%	7,247	51.38%	7	0.05%	-397	-2.81%	14,104
Butler	49,443	42.88%	65,854	57.11%	5	0.01%	-16,411	-14.23%	115,302
Carroll	6,182	55.58%	4,938	44.40%	2	0.02%	1,244	11.18%	11,122
Champaign	6,809	47.26%	7,598	52.73%	2	0.01%	-789	-5.47%	14,409
Clark	26,400	52.73%	23,656	47.25%	6	0.02%	2,744	5.48%	50,062
Clermont	25,333	39.00%	39,588	60.95%	34	0.05%	-14,255	-21.95%	64,955
Clinton	5,005	39.43%	7,687	60.56%	1	0.01%	-2,682	-21.13%	12,693
Columbiana	21,802	59.20%	15,025	40.80%	2	0.00%	6,777	18.40%	36,829
Coshocton	7,024	52.55%	6,340	47.43%	2	0.02%	684	5.12%	13,366
Crawford	8,227	49.31%	8,455	50.68%	1	0.01%	-228	-1.37%	16,683
Cuyahoga	319,645	70.57%	133,260	29.42%	29	0.01%	186,385	41.15%	452,934
Darke	8,267	40.95%	11,911	59.00%	9	0.05%	-3,644	-18.05%	20,187
Defiance	6,624	48.68%	6,977	51.28%	6	0.04%	-353	-2.60%	13,607
Delaware	27,109	41.87%	37,624	58.11%	17	0.02%	-10,515	-16.24%	64,750
Erie	19,372	63.74%	11,018	36.25%	1	0.01%	8,354	27.49%	30,391
Fairfield	25,283	46.99%	28,506	52.98%	12	0.03%	-3,223	-5.99%	53,801
Fayette	3,793	44.91%	4,651	55.07%	2	0.02%	-858	-10.16%	8,446
Franklin	217,961	58.57%	154,098	41.41%	51	0.02%	63,863	17.16%	372,110
Fulton	7,936	49.53%	8,079	50.43%	6	0.04%	-143	-0.90%	16,021
Gallia	4,803	47.75%	5,255	52.25%	0	0.00%	-452	-4.50%	10,058
Geauga	19,903	50.29%	19,653	49.66%	17	0.05%	250	0.63%	39,573
Greene	24,415	41.18%	34,797	58.69%	76	0.13%	-10,382	-17.51%	59,288
Guernsey	7,334	55.40%	5,905	44.60%	0	0.00%	1,429	10.80%	13,239
Hamilton	142,134	49.63%	144,167	50.34%	96	0.03%	-2,033	-0.71%	286,397
Hancock	10,498	40.97%	15,121	59.02%	3	0.01%	-4,623	-18.05%	25,622
Hardin	4,779	49.86%	4,803	50.11%	2	0.03%	-24	-0.25%	9,584
Harrison	3,530	59.02%	2,450	40.96%	1	0.02%	1,080	18.06%	5,981
Henry	5,354	47.12%	6,007	52.86%	2	0.02%	-653	-5.74%	11,363
Highland	5,674	43.71%	7,297	56.21%	10	0.08%	-1,623	-12.50%	12,981
Hocking	5,664	58.22%	4,062	41.75%	3	0.03%	1,602	16.47%	9,729
Holmes	2,810	34.89%	5,241	65.07%	4	0.04%	-2,431	-30.18%	8,055
Huron	10,234	54.06%	8,694	45.93%	2	0.01%	1,540	8.13%	18,930
Jackson	5,453	53.00%	4,833	46.98%	2	0.02%	620	6.02%	10,288
Jefferson	15,673	61.08%	9,988	38.92%	0	0.00%	5,685	22.16%	25,661
Knox	9,641	46.62%	11,036	53.37%	1	0.01%	-1,395	-6.75%	20,678
Lake	50,649	57.13%	37,988	42.85%	15	0.02%	12,661	14.28%	88,652
Lawrence	10,561	54.22%	8,916	45.78%	0	0.00%	1,645	8.44%	19,477
Licking	28,599	48.54%	30,312	51.44%	12	0.02%	-1,713	-2.90%	58,923
Logan	6,909	42.62%	9,297	57.35%	4	0.03%	-2,388	-14.73%	16,210
Lorain	67,429	66.39%	34,129	33.60%	5	0.01%	33,300	32.79%	101,563
Lucas	94,630	66.50%	47,659	33.49%	15	0.01%	46,971	33.01%	142,304
Madison	6,414	47.41%	7,110	52.55%	5	0.04%	-696	-5.14%	13,529
Mahoning	69,664	73.47%	25,151	26.53%	0	0.00%	44,513	46.94%	94,815
Marion	11,078	51.28%	10,526	48.72%	0	0.00%	552	2.56%	21,604
Medina	36,386	55.48%	29,186	44.50%	11	0.02%	7,200	10.98%	65,583
Meigs	3,990	51.42%	3,769	48.58%	0	0.00%	221	2.84%	7,759
Mercer	5,413	34.85%	10,118	65.14%	1	0.01%	-4,705	-30.29%	15,532
Miami	15,734	42.48%	21,299	57.50%	6	0.02%	-5,565	-15.02%	37,039
Monroe	4,131	68.09%	1,935	31.89%	1	0.02%	2,196	36.20%	6,067
Montgomery	100,491	53.22%	88,322	46.77%	23	0.01%	12,169	6.45%	188,836
Morgan	2,955	53.88%	2,523	46.01%	6	0.11%	432	7.87%	5,484
Morrow	5,976	47.88%	6,499	52.07%	6	0.05%	-523	-4.19%	12,481
Muskingum	15,664	55.55%	12,534	44.45%	2	0.00%	3,130	11.10%	28,200
Noble	2,611	50.50%	2,559	49.50%	0	0.00%	52	1.00%	5,170
Ottawa	10,548	60.20%	6,972	39.79%	1	0.01%	3,576	20.41%	17,521
Paulding	3,556	47.21%	3,976	52.78%	1	0.01%	-420	-5.57%	7,533
Perry	6,627	59.23%	4,555	40.71%	7	0.06%	2,072	18.52%	11,189
Pickaway	8,858	49.44%	9,059	50.56%	0	0.00%	-201	-1.12%	17,917
Pike	5,845	60.60%	3,798	39.38%	2	0.02%	2,047	21.22%	9,645
Portage	34,576	63.23%	20,075	36.71%	34	0.06%	14,501	26.52%	54,685
Preble	7,221	45.98%	8,436	53.72%	46	0.30%	-1,215	-7.74%	15,703
Putnam	5,600	39.60%	8,539	60.38%	2	0.02%	-2,939	-20.78%	14,141
Richland	24,431	53.24%	21,451	46.75%	7	0.01%	2,980	6.49%	45,889
Ross	13,061	55.42%	10,501	44.56%	4	0.02%	2,560	10.86%	23,566
Sandusky	12,899	56.37%	9,983	43.63%	0	0.00%	2,916	12.74%	22,882
Scioto	15,866	60.62%	10,308	39.38%	0	0.00%	5,558	21.24%	26,174
Seneca	10,742	53.48%	9,343	46.51%	1	0.01%	1,399	6.97%	20,086
Shelby	7,122	41.34%	10,101	58.64%	3	0.02%	-2,979	-17.30%	17,226
Stark	79,900	57.37%	59,353	42.62%	11	0.01%	20,547	14.75%	139,264
Summit	126,776	63.57%	72,559	36.39%	81	0.04%	54,217	27.18%	199,416
Trumbull	58,586	73.12%	21,520	26.86%	18	0.02%	37,066	46.26%	80,124
Tuscarawas	17,360	55.31%	14,024	44.68%	1	0.01%	3,336	10.63%	31,385
Union	6,881	40.85%	9,950	59.07%	12	0.08%	-3,069	-18.22%	16,843
Van Wert	4,177	40.09%	6,239	59.88%	4	0.03%	-2,062	-19.79%	10,420
Vinton	2,484	55.38%	2,001	44.62%	0	0.00%	483	10.76%	4,485
Warren	25,102	36.54%	43,588	63.45%	8	0.01%	-18,486	-26.91%	68,698
Washington	11,631	51.08%	11,140	48.92%	0	0.00%	491	2.16%	22,771
Wayne	18,299	47.79%	19,985	52.19%	9	0.02%	-1,686	-4.40%	38,293
Williams	6,438	49.57%	6,543	50.38%	7	0.05%	-105	-0.81%	12,988
Wood	25,875	56.85%	19,637	43.14%	3	0.01%	6,238	13.71%	45,515
Wyandot	3,912	48.17%	4,201	51.72%	9	0.11%	-289	-3.55%	8,122
Totals	2,257,485	56.16%	1,761,092	43.82%	830	0.02%	496,393	12.34%	4,019,407

Counties that flipped from Republican to Democratic

- Harrison (largest city: Cadiz)
- Hocking (largest city: Logan)
- Jackson (largest city: Jackson)
- Lawrence (largest city: Ironton)
- Noble (largest city: Caldwell)
- Vinton (largest city: McArthur)
- Seneca (largest city: Tiffin)
- Huron (largest city: Norwalk)
- Columbiana (largest city: Salem)
- Carroll (largest city: Carrollton)
- Tuscarawas (largest city: New Philadelphia)
- Guernsey (largest city: Cambridge)
- Coshocton (largest city: Coshocton)
- Geauga (largest city: Chardon)
- Medina (largest city: Medina)
- Morgan (largest city: McConnelsville)
- Washington (largest city: Marietta)
- Muskingum (largest city: Zanesville)
- Perry (largest city: New Lexington)
- Hocking (largest city: Logan)
- Jackson (largest city: Jackson)
- Lawrence (largest city: Ironton)
- Noble (largest city: Caldwell)
- Vinton (largest city: McArthur)
- Seneca (largest city: Tiffin)
- Huron (largest city: Norwalk)
- Columbiana (largest city: Salem)
- Carroll (largest city: Carrollton)
- Tuscarawas (largest city: New Philadelphia)
- Guernsey (largest city: Cambridge)
- Coshocton (largest city: Coshocton)
- Geauga (largest city: Chardon)
- Medina (largest city: Medina)
- Morgan (largest city: McConnelsville)
- Washington (largest city: Marietta)
- Muskingum (largest city: Zanesville)
- Perry (largest city: New Lexington)
- Pike (largest city: Waverly)
- Ross (largest city: Chillicothe)
- Scioto (largest city: Portsmouth)
- Jefferson (largest city: Steubenville)
- Sandusky (largest city: Fremont)
- Clark (largest municipality: Springfield)
- Stark (largest city: Canton)
- Athens (largest city: Athens)
- Montgomery (largest city: Dayton)
- Franklin (largest city: Columbus)
- Portage (largest city: Kent)
- Ashtabula (largest city: Ashtabula)
- Summit (largest city: Akron)
- Lake (largest city: Mentor)
- Lorain (largest municipality: Lorain)
- Erie (largest city: Sandusky)
- Cuyahoga (largest city: Cleveland)
- Lucas (largest city: Toledo)
- Ottawa (largest city: Port Clinton)
- Wood (largest city: Bowling Green)

Counties that flipped from Democratic to Republican

- Madison (largest city: London)

==== By congressional district ====
Sherrod Brown won 14 of 18 congressional districts, including seven which elected Republicans to the House.

District	Brown	DeWine	Representative
1st	51.8%	48.2%	Steve Chabot
2nd	43.2%	56.8%	
2nd	43.2%	56.8%	Jean Schmidt
3rd	49.5%	50.5%	Mike Turner
4th	46.8%	53.2%	Mike Oxley (109th Congress)
4th	46.8%	53.2%	Jim Jordan (110th Congress)
5th	50.9%	49.1%	Paul Gillmor
6th	60.0%	40.0%	Ted Strickland (109th Congress)
6th	60.0%	40.0%	Charlie Wilson (110th Congress)
7th	51.4%	48.6%	Dave Hobson
8th	42.0%	56.0%	John Boehner
9th	65.7%	34.3%	Marcy Kaptur
10th	65.5%	34.5%	Dennis Kucinich
11th	82.2%	17.8%	Stephanie Tubbs Jones
12th	52.5%	47.5%	Pat Tiberi
13th	63.9%	36.1%	Sherrod Brown (109th Congress)
13th	63.9%	36.1%	Betty Sutton (110th Congress)
14th	56.2%	43.8%	Steve LaTourette
15th	55.0%	45.0%	Deborah Pryce
16th	54.3%	45.7%	Ralph Regula
17th	72.4%	27.6%	Tim Ryan
18th	53.9%	46.1%	Bob Ney (109th Congress)
18th	53.9%	46.1%	Zack Space (110th Congress)

== See also ==
- 2006 United States Senate elections
- 2006 Ohio gubernatorial election
