= Merrill Keiser =

American political candidate (1944–2023)

Merrill Samuel "Sam" Keiser Jr. (May 14, 1944 – October 26, 2023) was an American political candidate from Fremont, Ohio. He was an owner-operator truck driver and was a candidate in the Democratic primary for United States Senate in May 2006, for the seat held by Republican R. Michael DeWine. Ohio election law requires only 1000 signatures to run for Senate as a major party primary candidate, and Keiser claimed to single-handedly gather these signatures. He lost the primary by a large margin to Sherrod Brown for the Ohio United States Senate election, 2006, receiving 163,628 votes (21.89%).

Keiser graduated from Fremont Ross High School in 1963. He joined the U.S. Army in 1963, and served in Iran in 1965 and in Vietnam during the Vietnam War. Upon leaving the army in 1966, he attended the Colorado State University College of Forestry and Natural Resources and received a Bachelor of Science degree in Watershed Management in 1970. He rejoined the Army in 1971. He received a Master of Divinity degree in Christian Education from Denver Seminary.

Keiser held several controversial positions. He is a vocal proponent of "traditional values" including heterosexual marriage - between one man and one woman only; appointment of strict constructionist jurists on every level, especially the Alabama Supreme Court, federal district courts and the Supreme Court; the Second Amendment; capital punishment; "winning" the war on terror; teaching and encouraging school prayer; taxpayer-financed school vouchers; and a "Biblical" view of Israel.

Additionally, Keiser was anti-abortion and called for denying funding to health providers who provide information about abortion. He claims on his blog that abortion is "sacrificing our babies to the gods of pleasure and convenience". Keiser is in favor of adult stem cell research and opposes embryonic stem cell research. On his campaign's weblog he wrote, "It (embryonic stem cell research) is a ploy of money-hungry academic researchers and blood-thirsty liberals and politicians who want to bring a culture of death to America and it part of their religion. It is just like the religions of old in which they used human infant sacrifice in idol worship." He was an advocate for a strong national defense and military. This includes using the US armed forces to "battle drugs and terrorism", something Keiser claimed Sherrod Brown is opposed to. Keiser did not cite the source of his claim.

Keiser called creationism "true" and endorses its teaching over evolution. Keiser said school children should be "taught to pray" and that "liberals" have spent too long worshipping the "god of Reason". Keiser is in favor of de-funding and total United States withdrawal from the United Nations. He has also said that he would not oppose making homosexuality a crime punishable by death for the overall spiritual and moral health of society, although he, himself, would not introduce such legislation. He also advocates reducing the deficit, limiting government spending and decreasing taxes but doesn't detail plans for such changes.

Furthermore, Keiser claims "God’s law is very clear about abortion, the death penalty and corrupting children." Additionally, the idea that "God's law" should affect policy in a secular democracy is itself controversial.

In March 2006, Keiser sparked further outrage with his suggestions that Elton John should be killed ("worthy of death"), as should Mary Cheney (daughter of Dick Cheney), for being homosexual. In May 2006 he called for homosexuality to be punishable by death. "Just as we have laws against taking drugs, we should have laws against immoral behaviour."

Keiser died on October 26, 2023.
