= MSG Sphere London =

Proposed music and entertainment venue in London, England

- Interactive map of MSG Sphere London
- Address: London, England
- Location: Stratford
- Coordinates: 51.543973°N 0.0018678°W
- Owner: Madison Square Garden Entertainment
- Capacity: 21,500
- Public transit: Stratford station Stratford International station Maryland station Stratford City bus station Stratford bus station

Construction
- Architect: Populous

Website
- london.msg.com

The MSG Sphere London was a proposed music and entertainment venue to be built in the Stratford area of East London, England. Initially proposed by the United States–based Madison Square Garden Company (MSG) in 2018 and subjected to a protracted planning process, MSG officially withdrew the plans in January 2024.

== Proposals ==
The MSG Sphere London was a building project of United States–based The Madison Square Garden Company, and financed by former Cablevision owner Charles Dolan and his son, James L. Dolan. Had it been approved, it would have been identical to the MSG Sphere in Las Vegas, which is also backed by James Dolan and was completed in 2023. Both buildings have been designed by the architectural firm Populous.

The MSG Sphere would have been equipped with a 19,000 x 13,500 pixel resolution LED screen spread across the venue's interior. All 17,500 seats would have high-speed internet access, and the sound system uses beam-forming technology to provide targeted, spatialized sound that is consistent in volume and quality across all seats. Haptic technology capabilities would be delivered through the floorboards. The exterior of the venue would feature 54,000 square metres of programmable lighting. A 3,000 person club venue was also under consideration.

== Planning process ==
The venue's proposed location was in Stratford near Westfield Stratford City, the East Village housing development, and the Queen Elizabeth Olympic Park, on a site used as a coach park during the 2012 Summer Olympics. The sphere-shaped venue was designed to have the world's largest LED screen and a seating capacity of 17,500. It was not designed as a sporting arena, but primarily for music, award ceremonies, corporate events, and product launches.

According to the official MSG website, public comments were reviewed at the end of 2018, and Deltapoll conducted a poll of local residents in July 2019.

On 5 June 2019, the London Legacy Development Corporation (LLDC), the planning authority for the site, consulted with the public, during which residents emphasised their need for greater transparency regarding the project. MSG's most recent document submission to the LLDC was filed in August 2020 about the Regulation 25 rules of the Town and Country Planning (Environmental Impact Assessment) Regulations 2017; all documents were available for review by the public.

The project gained planning approval on 22 March 2022 from the LLDC. The next steps comprised a review by the Mayor of London and a legal planning agreement. If those steps had been approved, construction could have begun.

=== Opposition ===
Anschutz Entertainment Group (AEG), which operates the O2 Arena in south-east London, inquired about the Sphere's proximity to existing entertainment venues such as the London Stadium, the Copper Box Arena, and its own O2 Arena, emphasising that "it is imperative MSG's proposals do not add to congestion in the area." AEG was found to be astroturfing a campaign against the sphere, creating a lobby group called "Newham Action Group", and was criticised for "subverting democracy" by MSG.

Others highlighted a shortage of affordable housing in the surrounding London Borough of Newham, with more than 25,000 households on its waiting list. They claimed that up to 1,400 homes could be built in place of the planned venue, and noted that plans for a "snow dome" ski centre in the exact location, backed by former London mayor Boris Johnson, were scrapped in 2016. In January 2019, a group of local residents set up a website describing reasons for their opposition to the Sphere project. On 14 June 2019, Hackney Council opposed plans by MSG to display giant illuminated advertisements on the dome of the sphere, but on 27 January 2023, the LLDC approved the use of advertising on the dome.

=== Planning permission rejection ===
In February 2023, the scheme was put on temporary hold by Michael Gove, Secretary of State at the Department for Levelling Up, Housing and Communities (DLUHC), using powers that potentially allow for a public planning inquiry into the project. Then, in November 2023, the sphere's planning permission was rejected by Mayor of London Sadiq Khan, primarily over concerns about potential light pollution.

MSG said they would seek other cities that might bring the technology to their communities. Tees Valley Mayor Ben Houchen wrote to James Dolan, offering Teesside as an alternative venue for the Sphere.

In December 2023, Gove used his powers to "call in" Khan's rejection of the project, overturning the Mayor's rejection and turning the final decision to DLUHC ministers. However, in January 2024, MSG wrote to the Planning Inspectorate officially withdrawing its plans for the project. In July 2026, it was reported that the Stratford site would be redeveloped for 2,100 homes, hotel accommodation, entertainment spaces and public squares.

It was later announced that a second Sphere would be built in Abu Dhabi instead.

== See also ==
- Avicii Arena
- Cinematic virtual reality
- Sphere (venue) in Las Vegas, Nevada
