= Sphere Entertainment =

American holding company in New York City

Sphere Entertainment Co.
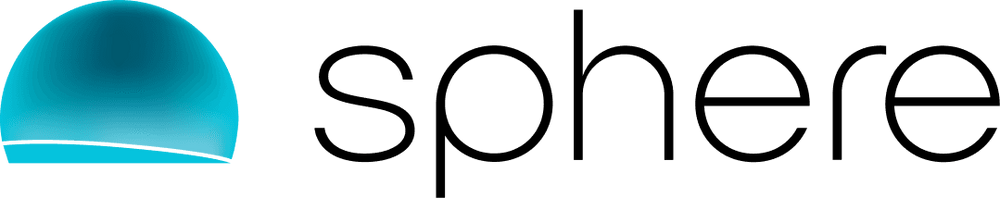
- Formerly: Madison Square Garden Entertainment
- Type: Public
- Traded as: NYSE: SPHR (Class A); S&P 600 component
- Industry: Entertainment; Real estate
- Founded: April 20, 2020; 6 years ago (as Madison Square Garden Entertainment); April 20, 2023; 3 years ago (as Sphere Entertainment)
- Founder: James L. Dolan
- Headquarters: New York City, New York, U.S.,
- Key people: James L. Dolan (executive chairman and CEO); Jennifer Koester (president and COO)
- Owner: Dolan family
- Subsidiaries: Sphere; Sphere Studios; MSG Networks

Sphere Entertainment Co. is an American entertainment holding company based in New York City, and controlled by the family of Charles Dolan. It owns the Sphere event venue in Paradise, Nevada, in the Las Vegas Valley and New York-based regional sports network chain MSG Networks.

The company was originally formed in 2020 as Madison Square Garden Entertainment, a spin-off of the non-sports assets of the Madison Square Garden Company. In 2023, Madison Square Garden Entertainment spun off its live events business as a new company under the same name, and the original MSG Entertainment was renamed Sphere Entertainment.

== History ==
Madison Square Garden Entertainment was first formed in 2020 as a spin-off of the non-sports assets of the Madison Square Garden Company (which was renamed Madison Square Garden Sports as a result). In 2021, it would acquire sibling company MSG Networks (which had been spun off from the Madison Square Garden Company in 2015).

In March 2023, MSG Entertainment's board approved a plan to spin off its "traditional" live entertainment business, leaving its regional sports networks and forthcoming Sphere venue in Las Vegas. Executive chairman and CEO James L. Dolan stated that the spin-off would result in two companies "well positioned to generate long-term value for our shareholders."

The spin-off was structured as a tax-free stock split, in which MSG Entertainment shareholders would receive one share in the events company for each share they own, and hold a 33% stake. The spin-off was completed on April 20, 2023, with the live events business being spun off under the Madison Square Garden Entertainment name, and the existing MSG Entertainment being renamed Sphere Entertainment.

Sphere briefly included MSGE's nearly 67% stake in Tao Group Hospitality, which was sold on April 18, 2023, to Mark Scheinberg's Mohari for $550 million.

In November 2023, CFO Gautam Ranji resigned. In June 2024, Sphere executive Jennifer Koester was promoted to president and chief operating officer.

In December 2023, Sphere was looking to build a new venue to be used for K-pop concerts in Hanam, South Korea but discussions stalled for South Korea and also Saudi Arabia. Sphere then held talks with developers in United Arab Emirates to develop a second Sphere on Yas Island in Abu Dhabi. In October 2024, Sphere Entertainment confirmed that it would build a second Sphere in Abu Dhabi which would be similar to their property in Las Vegas. In July 2025, Sphere Entertainment finalized a deal with the Abu Dhabi Department of Culture and Tourism to develop the venue in Abu Dhabi. In May 2026, the Abu Dhabi Sphere received a $1.7 billion investment with the project set to complete in 2029.

In March 2025, Dolan stated that that the company was exploring the possibility of building smaller-scale iterations of Sphere, with a capacity of around 5,000 spectators. In January 2026, the company proposed the construction of a 6,000-seat Sphere in National Harbor, Maryland outside of the MGM National Harbor casino hotel.
