= 2024 United States Senate election in Ohio =

- November 5, 2024
- Turnout: 71.71% (registered voters) ▲15.92 pp
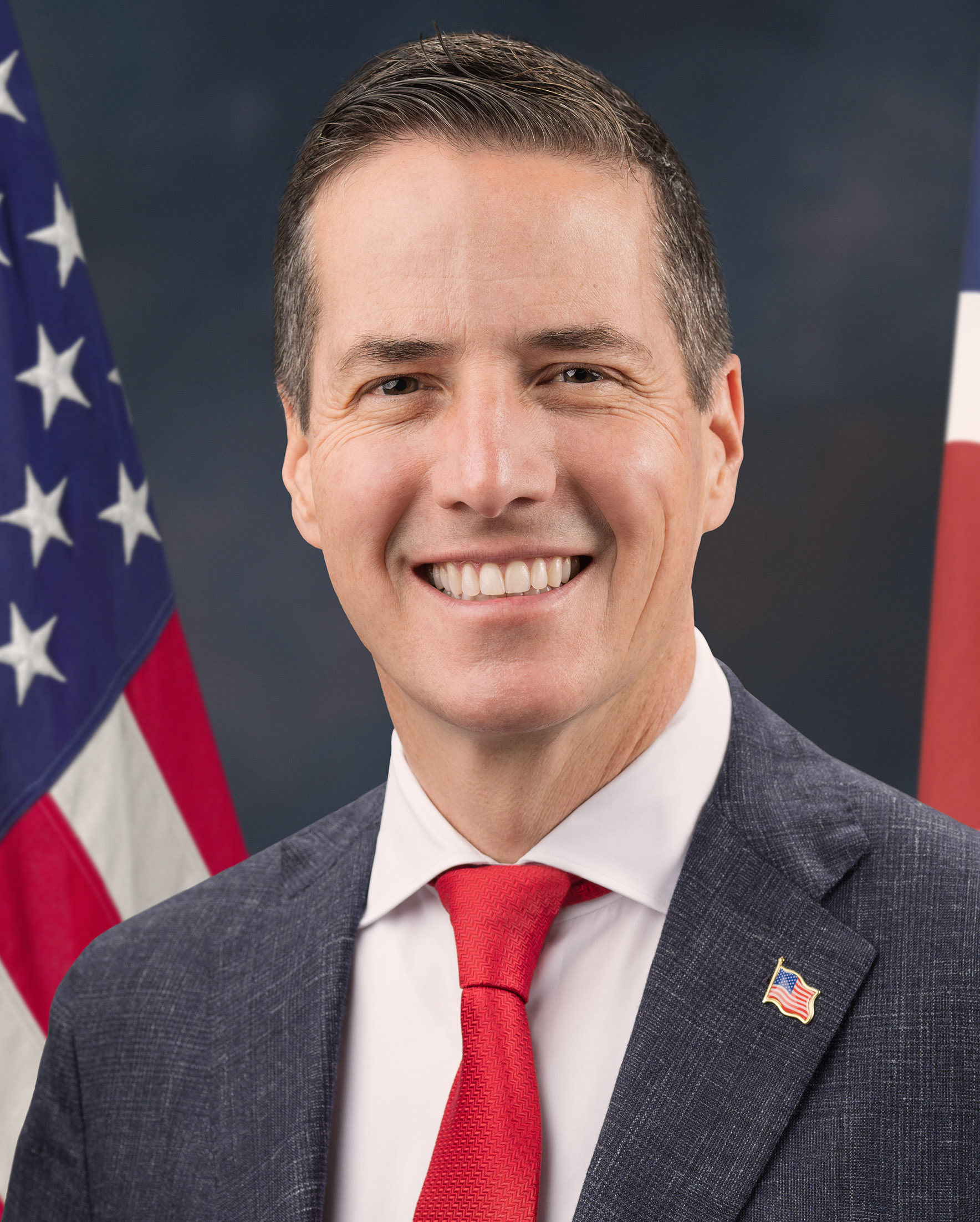

Nominee	Bernie Moreno	Sherrod Brown
Party	Republican	Democratic
Popular vote	2,857,383	2,650,949
Percentage	50.09%	46.47%
- Moreno: 40–50% 50–60% 60–70% 70–80% 80–90% >90% Brown: 40–50% 50–60% 60–70% 70–80% 80–90% >90% Tie: 40–50% No data
U.S. senator before election
Sherrod Brown
Democratic
Elected U.S. senator
Bernie Moreno
Republican

The 2024 United States Senate election in Ohio was held on November 5, 2024, to elect a member of the United States Senate to represent the state of Ohio. Republican businessman Bernie Moreno defeated Democratic three-term incumbent Sherrod Brown. Primary elections took place on March 19, 2024. This was the first U.S. Senate race in Ohio where the incumbent was defeated since 2006, when Brown defeated Mike DeWine.

This race was one of two 2024 U.S. Senate races in which Democratic senators sought re-election in states where Republican Donald Trump won in both the 2016 and 2020 presidential elections (the other being Montana). This was the most expensive U.S. Senate election of 2024, with a record-breaking $483.4 million spent in total. Brown's reelection was considered essential for Democrats' chances to retain the Senate majority in 2024.

Moreno won 8 counties that Brown won in 2018, all of them located in northern Ohio: Ashtabula, Erie, Lake, Mahoning, Ottawa, Portage, Trumbull, and Wood. His campaign was aided by Republican nominee Donald Trump's 11.21% margin of victory in Ohio, helping secure an outright majority for Senate Republicans for the first time since 2021, with a net gain of four seats in the 2024 elections. Although Brown outperformed Kamala Harris in the concurrent presidential election by 7.59 percentage points, it was not enough to win. Brown received about 120,000 more votes than Harris, while Moreno received about 320,000 fewer votes than Trump. Libertarian candidate Don Kissick received around 195,000 votes, approximately 3% of the vote. This was the first time since 1954 that a Republican defeated an incumbent Democrat senator in Ohio. Along with Bob Casey Jr. in Pennsylvania and Jon Tester in Montana, Brown was one of three incumbent senators to lose re-election in 2024. Notably, all three were first elected in 2006, defeating Republican incumbents, and won re-election in 2012 and 2018. To date, this is Brown's second general election loss of his political career, having previously lost re-election in 1990 as Ohio's Secretary of State to Robert Taft. Brown would later win Ohio's other Senate seat in 2026, successfully ousting incumbent Jon Husted.

Moreno's swearing in on January 3, 2025 gave Republicans control of both of Ohio's U.S. Senate seats for the first time since 2007. As Ohio's other U.S. senator, JD Vance, was elected vice president of the United States, Moreno became Ohio's senior senator upon Vance's resignation on January 10, 2025.

== Background ==
After voting for Barack Obama in both the 2008 and 2012 presidential elections, Ohio has trended increasingly Republican in subsequent years and is now considered a red state. Republicans hold all statewide offices in addition to the majority in both chambers of the state legislature. Republicans also have majority of the state's US House delegation.

Donald Trump won Ohio in 2016 and again in 2020 by 8 points both times.

Republican JD Vance defeated Democrat Tim Ryan in 2022 for Ohio’s other U.S. Senate seat by slightly over 6 points.

Brown was first elected in 2006, defeating Senator Mike DeWine (who was subsequently elected governor), and won re-election in 2012 and 2018. If he had been reelected he would have been only the second Ohioan to be elected to the United States Senate by popular vote four times, the other being John Glenn. Abortion was a key issue of the election. Brown held a pro-choice stance, while Moreno held a pro life stance and won the support of Ohio Right to Life. Brown raised the issue frequently. Because of this, the topic of abortion made the news. Initially, the seat was viewed by many to be a likely Democratic win, with some early polls showing Brown ahead, but Moreno attained a lead in the summer which grew through the duration of the campaign.

== Democratic primary ==
=== Candidates ===
==== Nominee ====
- Sherrod Brown, incumbent U.S. senator (2007–2025)

=== Endorsements ===
Sherrod Brown

U.S. senators

- Mark Kelly, Arizona (2020–present)

Political parties

- Ohio Democratic Party

Organizations

- Bend the Arc
- Council for a Livable World
- End Citizens United
- Feminist Majority PAC
- Human Rights Campaign
- J Street PAC
- Jewish Democratic Council of America
- Joint Action Committee for Political Affairs
- League of Conservation Voters
- Natural Resources Defense Council
- Planned Parenthood Action Fund
- Population Connection Action Fund
- Reproductive Freedom for All
- Sierra Club
- Swing Left

Labor unions

- National Education Association
- North Shore AFL-CIO

=== Fundraising ===
Campaign finance reports as of December 31, 2023
Candidate	Raised	Spent	Cash on hand
Sherrod Brown (D)	$27,838,244	$14,594,991	$14,614,497
Source: Federal Election Commission

=== Polling ===
Hypothetical polling

Sherrod Brown vs. Tim Ryan vs. Shontel Brown

Poll source	Date(s) administered	Sample size (Note: Key: A – all adults RV – registered voters LV – likely voters V – unclear)	Margin of error	Sherrod Brown	Shontel Brown	Tim Ryan	Undecided
Ohio Northern University	October 16–19, 2023	256 (LV) (Note: A subset of poll respondents who said they planned to vote in the Democratic primary)	± 8.3%	58%	6%	15%	21%
Ohio Northern University	July 17–26, 2023	675 (RV)	± 3.7%	59%	7%	17%	17%

=== Results ===
Democratic primary results
Party	Candidate	Votes	%
Democratic	Sherrod Brown (incumbent)	535,305	100.0%
Total votes		535,305	100.0%

== Republican primary ==
=== Candidates ===
==== Nominee ====
- Bernie Moreno, former car dealership owner, father-in-law of U.S. representative Max Miller, and candidate for the U.S. Senate in 2022

==== Eliminated in primary ====
- Matt Dolan, state senator from the 24th district (2017–2024) and candidate for the U.S. Senate in 2022
- Frank LaRose, Ohio Secretary of State (2019–present)

==== Failed to qualify ====
- Doug Stuart, retired businessman

==== Declined ====
- Warren Davidson, U.S. representative for Ohio's 8th congressional district (2016–present) (ran for re-election, endorsed Moreno)
- Mark Kvamme, venture capitalist and sports car racing driver (endorsed Moreno)
- Josh Mandel, former Ohio State Treasurer (2011–2019), nominee for the U.S. Senate in 2012 and candidate in 2018 and 2022 (endorsed Moreno)
- Vivek Ramaswamy, pharmaceutical executive (ran unsuccessfully for president, endorsed Moreno)

=== Debates ===
No.	Date	Host	Moderator	Link	Candidates		
Key: P Participant A Absent N Non-invitee I Invitee W Withdrawn
Key: P Participant A Absent N Non-invitee I Invitee W Withdrawn					Matt Dolan	Frank LaRose	Bernie Moreno
1	January 22, 2024	FOX 8	Colleen Marshall; Joe Toohey	FOX 8	P	P	P
2	February 19, 2024	Spectrum News	Mike Kallmeyer	Spectrum News	P	P	P
3	March 6, 2024	WLWT	Sheree Paolello	YouTube	P	P	P

=== Endorsements ===
Matt Dolan

U.S. senators

- Rob Portman, Ohio (2011–2023)

Governors

- Mike DeWine, governor of Ohio (2019–present)

State representatives

- Gayle Manning, HD-52 (2019–present)

Local officials

- Greg Lashutka, former mayor of Columbus (1992–2000)

Individuals

- Dee Haslam, co-owner of the Cleveland Browns
- Jimmy Haslam, co-owner of the Cleveland Browns

Newspapers

- The Plain Dealer (Republican primary only)
Frank LaRose

U.S. representatives

- Mike Turner, OH-10 (2003–present)

State representatives

- Mike Loychik, HD-65 (2021–present)
- Melanie Miller, HD-67 (2023–present)
- Josh Williams, HD-41 (2023–present)

Political parties

- Scioto County Republican Party

Organizations

- Ohio Right to Life (co-endorsement with Moreno)
Bernie Moreno

U.S. presidents

- Donald Trump, 45th president of the United States (2017–2021)

U.S. ambassadors

- Richard Grenell, former U.S. Ambassador to Germany (2018–2020)

U.S. senators

- John Barrasso, Wyoming (2007–present)
- Marsha Blackburn, Tennessee (2019–present)
- Norm Coleman, Minnesota (2003–2009)
- Ted Cruz, Texas (2013–present)
- Mike Lee, Utah (2011–present)
- Cynthia Lummis, Wyoming (2021–present)
- Roger Marshall, Kansas (2021–present)
- Rand Paul, Kentucky (2011–present)
- Marco Rubio, Florida (2011–2025)
- Eric Schmitt, Missouri (2023–present)
- Tommy Tuberville, Alabama (2021–present)
- JD Vance, Ohio (2023–2025)

U.S. representatives

- Warren Davidson, OH-08 (2016–present)
- Newt Gingrich, former Speaker of the House (1995−1999) from GA-06 (1979−1999)
- Jim Jordan, OH-04 (2007–present)
- Max Miller, OH-07 (2023–present) (candidate's son-in-law)
- Lee Zeldin, NY-01 (2015–2023)

Governors

- Kristi Noem, South Dakota (2019–2025)

Statewide officials

- Ken Blackwell, former Ohio Secretary of State (1999–2007)
- Dave Yost, Ohio Attorney General (2019–2026)

Individuals

- David Bossie, president of Citizens United
- Mark Kvamme, venture capitalist
- Kari Lake, former KSAZ-TV news anchor
- Vivek Ramaswamy, pharmaceutical executive and candidate for president in 2024
- Donald Trump Jr., businessman and executive vice president of the Trump Organization

Political parties

- Brown County Republican Party
- Clermont County Republican Party
- Cuyahoga County Republican Party
- Greene County Republican Party
- Preble County Republican Party
- Summit County Republican Party
- Warren County Republican Party

Organizations

- Citizens United Political Victory Fund
- Club for Growth
- Fairshake
- Ohio Right to Life (co-endorsement with LaRose)
- Republican Jewish Coalition
- Senate Conservatives Fund
- Turning Point Action PAC
Declined to endorse

Statewide officials

- Jon Husted, lieutenant governor of Ohio (2019–2025)

Organizations

- National Republican Senatorial Committee
- Ohio Republican Party

=== Fundraising ===
Campaign finance reports as of February 28, 2024
Candidate	Raised	Spent	Cash on hand
Matt Dolan (R)	$11,425,814 (Note: $9,000,000 of this total was self-funded by Dolan.)	$9,089,493	$2,383,077
Bernie Moreno (R)	$9,735,460 (Note: $4,200,000 of this total was self-funded by Moreno.)	$7,338,751	$2,396,709
Frank LaRose (R)	$2,217,016 (Note: $250,000 of this total was self-funded by LaRose.)	$1,625,972	$591,043
Source: Federal Election Commission

=== Polling ===
Poll source	Date(s) administered	Sample size	Margin of error	Matt Dolan	Frank LaRose	Bernie Moreno	Other	Undecided
Emerson College	March 17–18, 2024	450 (LV)	± 4.6%	40%	16%	44%	–	
Mainstreet Research/ Florida Atlantic University	March 13–15, 2024	818 (RV)	± 3.4%	31%	19%	29%	–	21%
East Carolina University	March 8–11, 2024	<1,298 (LV)	± 4.6%	39%	27%	34%	–	
SurveyUSA (Note: Poll sponsored by the Ohio Northern University Institute for Civics and Public Policy)	March 6–11, 2024	533 (LV)	± 3.3%	18%	16%	22%	–	44%
Emerson College	March 7–10, 2024	443 (LV)	± 2.6%	26%	16%	23%	3%	32%
SurveyUSA (Note: Poll sponsored by The Center for Election Science)	February 27 – March 3, 2024	568 (LV)	± 4.6%	27%	21%	29%	–	23%
Fabrizio, Lee & Associates (R) (Note: Poll sponsored by Moreno's campaign)	February 25–26, 2024	500 (LV)	± 4.4%	19%	21%	31%	–	27%
Emerson College	January 23–25, 2024	1844 (RV)	± 2.3%	15%	21%	22%	–	42%
McLaughlin & Associates (R) (Note: Poll sponsored by Buckeye Values PAC, which supports Moreno)	December 12–14, 2023	600 (LV)	± 4.0%	16%	18%	22%	–	44%
SurveyUSA	December 8–12, 2023	573 (LV)	± 4.6%	18%	33%	12%	1% (Note: Joel Mutchler with 1%)	35%
Fabrizio, Lee & Associates (R)	December 3–5, 2023	600 (LV)	± 4.0%	18%	19%	23%	–	40%
co/efficient (R)	November 18–20, 2023	950 (LV)	± 3.18%	13%	14%	15%	–	58%
Emerson College/WJW-TV	November 10–13, 2023	468 (LV)	± 4.5%	15%	18%	10%	32% (Note: "Someone else" with 29%; Joel Mutchler with 3%)	25%
Data for Progress (D)	October 31 – November 2, 2023	294 (LV)	± 6.0%	20%	30%	7%	0% (Note: Joel Mutchler with 0%)	43%
Ohio Northern University	October 16–19, 2023	269 (LV) (Note: A subset of poll respondents who said they planned to vote in the Republican primary)	± 8.2%	13%	30%	7%	2%	49%
Ohio Northern University	July 17–26, 2023	675 (RV)	± 3.7%	18%	32%	7%	1%	43%
Suffolk/USA Today	July 9–12, 2023	190 (RV)	–	14%	19%	9%	–	57%
East Carolina University	June 21–24, 2023	405 (RV)	± 4.0%	14%	17%	7%	4%	58%
Causeway Solutions (R) (Note: Poll sponsored by Leadership for Ohio Fund, which supports LaRose)	May 19–27, 2023	526 (RV)	± 2.5%	11%	24%	6%	17%	42%

=== Results ===
Results by county: Moreno: 40–50%; 50–60%; 60–70%

Vote share of Bernie Moreno (left), Matt Dolan (center), Frank LaRose (right) by counties

Republican primary results
Party	Candidate	Votes	%
Republican	Bernie Moreno	557,626	50.48%
Republican	Matt Dolan	363,013	32.86%
Republican	Frank LaRose	184,111	16.67%
Total votes		1,104,750	100.0%

== Libertarian Party ==
=== Nominee ===
- Don Kissick, auto worker and nominee for Ohio's 5th congressional district in 2018

== Write-in candidates ==
=== Declared ===
- Stephen Faris, electrical engineer
- David Allen Pastorius
- Nathan Russell
- Tariq Shabazz (Green Party), U.S. Navy veteran and perennial candidate

== General election ==
=== Predictions ===
Source	Ranking	As of
The Cook Political Report	Tossup	September 25, 2024
Inside Elections	Tossup	September 26, 2024
Sabato's Crystal Ball	Lean R (flip)	November 4, 2024
Decision Desk HQ/The Hill	Tossup	September 27, 2024
Elections Daily	Lean D	November 4, 2024
CNalysis	Tilt D	November 4, 2024
RealClearPolitics	Tossup	September 28, 2024
Split Ticket	Tossup	October 23, 2024
538	Tossup	October 23, 2024

=== Post-primary endorsements ===
Sherrod Brown (D)

Statewide officials

- Andy Beshear, governor of Kentucky (2019–present)
- Bob Taft, former governor of Ohio (1999–2007) (Republican)
- Gretchen Whitmer, governor of Michigan (2019–present)

Individuals

- Harry Dunn, former U.S. Capitol Police officer

Organizations

- Giffords
- People for the American Way

Labor unions

- Actors' Equity Association
- Communications Workers of America
- Ohio Federation of Teachers
- United Auto Workers of America
- United Mine Workers of America
Bernie Moreno (R)

Executive branch officials

- John Bolton, former U.S. national security advisor (2018–2019)

U.S. senators

- John Thune, Senate minority whip (2021–2025) from South Dakota (2005–present)

Statewide officials

- Mike DeWine, governor of Ohio (2019–present)
- Keith Faber, Ohio state auditor (2019–present)
- Jon Husted, lieutenant governor of Ohio (2019–2025)
- Frank LaRose, Ohio secretary of state (2019–present)
- Robert Sprague, Ohio state treasurer (2019–present)

Individuals

- Ben Shapiro, conservative political commentator

Organizations

- College Republicans of America
- Susan B. Anthony Pro-Life America

=== Fundraising ===
Campaign finance reports as of October 16, 2024
Candidate	Raised	Spent	Cash on hand
Sherrod Brown (D)	$91,399,138	$88,358,633	$4,411,749
Bernie Moreno (R)	$24,237,971 (Note: $4,500,838 of this total was self-funded by Moreno.)	$21,447,672	$2,636,429
Source: Federal Election Commission

=== Polling ===
Aggregate polls

Source of poll aggregation	Dates administered	Dates updated	Sherrod Brown (D)	Bernie Moreno (R)	Undecided (Note: Calculated by taking the difference of 100% and all other candidates combined.)	Margin
FiveThirtyEight	through November 4, 2024	November 4, 2024	47.1%	47.8%	5.1%	Moreno +0.7%
RealClearPolitics	October 23 – November 4, 2024	November 4, 2024	46.3%	48.0%	5.7%	Moreno +1.7%
270toWin	October 10 – November 4, 2024	November 4, 2024	47.3%	47.0%	5.7%	Brown +0.3%
TheHill/DDHQ	through November 4, 2024	November 4, 2024	46.8%	48.9%	4.3%	Moreno +2.1%
Average			46.9%	47.9%	5.2%	Moreno +1.0%

Poll source	Date(s) administered	Sample size	Margin of error	Sherrod Brown (D)	Bernie Moreno (R)	Other	Undecided
AtlasIntel	November 3–4, 2024	1,022 (LV)	± 3.0%	46%	49%	3% (Note: "Blank/Null/Won't vote" with 2%; "Other" with 1%)	3%
The Trafalgar Group (R)	November 2–4, 2024	1,095 (LV)	± 2.9%	48%	48%	2%	2%
Emerson College (Note: Poll sponsored by The Hill)	October 30 – November 2, 2024	900 (LV)	± 3.2%	45%	48%	–	6%
Emerson College	October 30 – November 2, 2024	900 (LV)	± 3.2%	48% (Note: With voters who lean towards a given candidate)	52%	–	–
Morning Consult	October 23 – November 1, 2024	1,254 (LV)	± 3.0%	46%	47%	–	7%
Miami University	October 28–30, 2024	857 (RV)	± 5.0%	48%	46%	3% (Note: Kissick (L) with 3%;"Other" with <1%)	2%
The Trafalgar Group (R)	October 25–28, 2024	1,127 (LV)	± 2.9%	48%	47%	2%	3%
ActiVote	October 14–28, 2024	400 (LV)	± 4.9%	49%	51%	–	–
J.L. Partners (R)	October 22–24, 2024	997 (LV)	± 3.1%	46%	52%	3%	–
University of Akron	September 12 – October 24, 2024	1,241 (RV)	± 2.8%	46%	44%	–	10%
OnMessage Inc. (R) (Note: Poll sponsored by Senate Opportunity Fund, a super PAC that primarily supports Republican candidates in U.S. Senate races)	October 19–22, 2024	600 (LV)	± 4.0%	47%	49%	3% (Note: Kissick (L) with 2%; "Other" with 1%)	3%
Bowling Green State University/YouGov	October 10–21, 2024	1,000 (LV)	± 3.6%	47%	45%	1% (Note: "Did not vote for Senator" with 1%)	7%
ActiVote	September 23 – October 20, 2024	400 (LV)	± 4.9%	48%	52%	–	–
Morning Consult	October 6–15, 2024	490 (LV)	± 3.0%	46%	47%	1%	6%
The Washington Post	October 3–7, 2024	1,002 (LV)	± 3.5%	48%	47%	1% (Note: "Wouldn't Vote" with 1%)	3%
The Washington Post	October 3–7, 2024	1,002 (RV)	± 3.5%	48%	47%	1% (Note: "Wouldn't Vote" with 1%)	4%
Marist College	October 3–7, 2024	1,327 (LV)	± 3.2%	50%	48%	–	2%
Marist College	October 3–7, 2024	1,511 (RV)	± 3.0%	49%	48%	1% (Note: "Another party's candidate" with 1%)	2%
Bowling Green State University/YouGov	September 18–27, 2024	1,000 (LV)	± 3.6%	49%	45%	–	6%
New York Times/Siena College	September 21–26, 2024	687 (LV)	± 4.2%	47%	43%	–	10%
New York Times/Siena College	September 21–26, 2024	687 (RV)	± 4.1%	46%	41%	–	13%
ActiVote	August 16 – September 22, 2024	400 (LV)	± 4.9%	49%	51%	–	–
RMG Research (Note: Poll sponsored by the Napolitan Institute)	September 18–20, 2024	781 (LV)	± 3.5%	46%	48%	5% (Note: "Won't Vote" with 5%)	–
Morning Consult	September 9–18, 2024	1,488 (LV)	± 3.0%	46%	44%	–	10%
Morning Consult	August 30 – September 8, 2024	1,558 (LV)	± 3.0%	46%	43%	–	11%
Rasmussen Reports (R) (Note: Poll sponsored by NumbersUSA, a conservative group)	August 13–17, 2024	1,267 (LV)	–	47%	42%	–	11%
ActiVote	July 20 – August 12, 2024	400 (LV)	± 4.9%	52.5%	47.5%	–	–
Fabrizio Ward (R)/ Impact Research (D) (Note: Poll sponsored by AARP)	July 23–28, 2024	600 (LV)	± 4.0%	46%	42%	1%	11%
Remington Research Group (R) (Note: Poll sponsored by American Fuel and Petrochemical Manufacturers, a group that supports Republicans.)	June 29 – July 1, 2024	611 (LV)	± 4.0%	50%	44%	–	7%
Marist College	June 3–6, 2024	1,137 (RV)	± 3.6%	50%	45%	1%	4%
National Public Affairs	May 28–29, 2024	801 (LV)	± 3.5%	54%	46%	–	–
	March 19, 2024	Primary elections held					
Mainstreet Research/FAU	March 13–15, 2024	818 (RV)	± 3.4%	47%	36%	–	17%
East Carolina University	March 8–11, 2024	1,298 (LV)	± 3.2%	45%	41%	3%	12%
SurveyUSA	March 6–11, 2024	533 (LV)	± 3.3%	43%	37%	–	20%
Emerson College	March 7–10, 2024	1,300 (RV)	± 2.6%	39%	34%	6%	21%
Emerson College	January 23–25, 2024	1844 (RV)	± 2.3%	39%	37%	5%	18%
Emerson College (Note: Poll sponsored by WGW-TV)	November 10–13, 2023	1,000 (RV)	± 3.0%	42%	32%	–	26%
Data for Progress (D)	October 31 – November 2, 2023	597 (LV)	± 4.0%	47%	44%	–	9%
Ohio Northern University	October 16–19, 2023	668 (RV)	± 3.8%	48%	26%	1%	25%
Emerson College	October 1–3, 2023	438 (RV)	± 4.5%	35%	33%	–	32%
Ohio Northern University	July 17–26, 2023	675 (RV)	± 3.7%	45%	28%	0%	27%
Suffolk University	July 9–12, 2023	500 (LV)	± 4.4%	48%	41%	–	10%
East Carolina University	June 21–24, 2023	805 (RV)	± 4.0%	46%	42%	2%	11%

Hypothetical polling

Sherrod Brown vs. Matt Dolan

Poll source	Date(s) administered	Sample size	Margin of error	Sherrod Brown (D)	Matt Dolan (R)	Other	Undecided
Mainstreet Research/FAU	March 13–15, 2024	818 (RV)	± 3.4%	45%	41%	–	14%
East Carolina University	March 8–11, 2024	1,298 (LV)	± 3.2%	41%	43%	4%	12%
SurveyUSA	March 6–11, 2024	533 (LV)	± 3.3%	42%	39%	–	18%
Emerson College	March 7–10, 2024	1,300 (RV)	± 2.6%	37%	34%	7%	22%
Emerson College	January 23–25, 2024	1844 (RV)	± 2.3%	38%	37%	5%	20%
Emerson/WJW-TV	November 10–13, 2023	1,000 (RV)	± 3.0%	41%	38%	–	22%
Data for Progress (D)	October 31 – November 2, 2023	597 (LV)	± 4.0%	47%	46%	–	7%
Ohio Northern University	October 16–19, 2023	668 (RV)	± 3.8%	45%	30%	0%	25%
Emerson College	October 1–3, 2023	438 (RV)	± 4.5%	36%	38%	–	26%
Ohio Northern University	July 17–26, 2023	675 (RV)	± 3.7%	45%	33%	0%	22%
Suffolk University	July 9–12, 2023	500 (LV)	± 4.4%	46%	43%	–	11%
East Carolina University	June 21–24, 2023	805 (RV)	± 4.0%	45%	44%	4%	7%

Sherrod Brown vs. Frank LaRose

Poll source	Date(s) administered	Sample size	Margin of error	Sherrod Brown (D)	Frank LaRose (R)	Other	Undecided
Mainstreet Research/ Florida Atlantic University	March 13–15, 2024	818 (RV)	± 3.4%	48%	37%	–	15%
East Carolina University	March 8–11, 2024	1,298 (LV)	± 3.2%	45%	40%	4%	12%
SurveyUSA	March 6–11, 2024	533 (LV)	± 3.3%	44%	36%	–	19%
Emerson College	March 7–10, 2024	1,300 (RV)	± 2.6%	39%	33%	7%	21%
Emerson College	January 23–25, 2024	1844 (RV)	± 2.3%	39%	37%	6%	18%
Emerson/WJW-TV	November 10–13, 2023	1,000 (RV)	± 3.0%	41%	36%	–	24%
Data for Progress (D)	October 31 – November 2, 2023	597 (LV)	± 4.0%	46%	46%	–	8%
Ohio Northern University	October 16–19, 2023	668 (RV)	± 3.8%	44%	31%	0%	25%
Emerson College	October 1–3, 2023	438 (RV)	± 4.5%	38%	39%	–	23%
Ohio Northern University	July 17–26, 2023	675 (RV)	± 3.7%	45%	32%	0%	23%
Suffolk University	July 9–12, 2023	500 (LV)	± 4.4%	45%	45%	–	10%
East Carolina University	June 21–24, 2023	805 (RV)	± 4.0%	44%	42%	4%	11%

Sherrod Brown vs. Joel Mutchler

Poll source	Date(s) administered	Sample size	Margin of error	Sherrod Brown (D)	Joel Mutchler (R)	Other	Undecided
Data for Progress (D)	October 31 – November 2, 2023	597 (LV)	± 4.0%	48%	43%	-	9%

Sherrod Brown vs. generic Republican

Poll source	Date(s) administered	Sample size	Margin of error	Sherrod Brown (D)	Generic Republican	Undecided
Causeway Solutions (R)	May 19–27, 2023	1639 (RV)	± 2.5%	39%	37%	24%

=== Results ===
Moreno was declared the winner at around 11:30 PM on Election Day. Brown had the second worst performance of a Democratic incumbent in 2024. Only Montana Senator Jon Tester had a worse performance.

While Brown was able to win urban counties, Moreno won nearly all rural and suburban counties except Athens and Lorain. He also managed to win most counties in Brown’s home region of northern Ohio, flipping 8 counties in this area that Brown had previously won.

2024 United States Senate election in Ohio
Party	Candidate	Votes	%	±%
Republican	Bernie Moreno	2,857,383	50.09%	+3.51%
Democratic	Sherrod Brown (incumbent)	2,650,949	46.47%	−6.93%
Libertarian	Don Kissick	195,648	3.43%	+3.43%
Write-in		640	0.01%	-0.01%
Total votes		5,704,620	100.00%	
Turnout			69.91%	+15.26
Republican gain from Democratic				

==== By county ====
County	Bernie Moreno Republican		Sherrod Brown Democratic		Various candidates Other parties		Margin		Total
County	#	%	#	%	#	%	#	%	Total
Adams	9,325	76.60%	2,447	20.10%	401	3.29%	6,878	56.50%	12,173
Allen	30,208	65.69%	14,120	30.70%	1,660	3.61%	16,088	34.99%	45,988
Ashland	17,894	68.32%	7,280	27.79%	1,019	3.89%	10,614	40.53%	26,193
Ashtabula	24,117	56.50%	16,785	39.33%	1,780	4.17%	7,332	17.17%	42,682
Athens	10,013	39.06%	14,696	57.32%	928	3.62%	−4,683	−18.26%	25,637
Auglaize	19,363	76.02%	5,248	20.60%	861	3.38%	14,115	55.42%	25,472
Belmont	20,146	65.51%	9,476	30.82%	1,129	3.67%	10,670	34.69%	30,751
Brown	15,622	74.46%	4,610	21.97%	748	3.57%	11,012	52.49%	20,980
Butler	104,952	57.91%	69,734	38.48%	6,557	3.62%	35,218	19.43%	181,243
Carroll	9,543	69.87%	3,545	25.95%	571	4.18%	5,998	43.92%	13,659
Champaign	13,917	68.68%	5,547	27.37%	801	3.95%	8,370	41.31%	20,265
Clark	36,611	58.45%	23,630	37.73%	2,393	3.82%	12,981	20.72%	62,634
Clermont	70,592	62.43%	37,825	33.45%	4,649	4.11%	32,767	28.98%	113,066
Clinton	14,513	70.61%	5,154	25.08%	887	4.32%	9,359	45.53%	20,554
Columbiana	31,757	66.72%	13,902	29.21%	1,935	4.07%	17,855	37.51%	47,594
Coshocton	11,011	68.03%	4,457	27.54%	717	4.43%	6,554	40.49%	16,185
Crawford	13,938	69.24%	5,400	26.82%	793	3.94%	8,538	42.42%	20,131
Cuyahoga	170,671	30.00%	384,042	67.49%	14,352	2.52%	−213,371	−37.49%	569,065
Darke	20,615	76.75%	5,359	19.95%	886	3.30%	15,256	56.80%	26,860
Defiance	12,028	64.22%	5,880	31.39%	822	4.39%	6,148	32.83%	18,730
Delaware	65,715	49.41%	63,697	47.89%	3,582	2.69%	2,018	1.52%	132,994
Erie	19,654	50.00%	18,117	46.09%	1,536	3.91%	1,537	3.91%	39,307
Fairfield	47,342	56.45%	33,697	40.18%	2,819	3.36%	13,645	16.27%	83,858
Fayette	8,712	70.30%	3,207	25.88%	474	3.82%	5,505	44.42%	12,393
Franklin	186,441	31.65%	385,850	65.50%	16,790	2.85%	−199,409	−33.85%	589,081
Fulton	14,450	65.44%	6,764	30.63%	868	3.93%	7,686	34.81%	22,082
Gallia	9,316	73.22%	2,912	22.89%	496	3.90%	6,404	50.33%	12,724
Geauga	30,987	56.72%	22,315	40.85%	1,330	2.43%	8,672	15.87%	54,632
Greene	49,477	55.06%	37,327	41.54%	3,052	3.40%	12,150	13.52%	89,856
Guernsey	11,836	68.07%	4,839	27.83%	712	4.10%	6,997	40.24%	17,387
Hamilton	158,523	38.88%	235,825	57.84%	13,394	3.28%	−77,302	−18.96%	407,742
Hancock	23,803	63.44%	12,170	32.44%	1,547	4.12%	11,633	31.00%	37,520
Hardin	8,839	69.10%	3,367	26.32%	585	4.57%	5,472	42.78%	12,791
Harrison	4,891	69.20%	1,857	26.27%	320	4.53%	3,034	42.93%	7,068
Henry	9,685	66.32%	4,356	29.83%	562	3.85%	5,329	36.49%	14,603
Highland	14,884	75.45%	4,152	21.05%	692	3.51%	10,732	54.40%	19,728
Hocking	8,599	64.67%	4,125	31.02%	572	4.30%	4,474	33.65%	13,296
Holmes	9,699	79.52%	2,117	17.36%	381	3.12%	7,582	62.16%	12,197
Huron	17,090	63.69%	8,452	31.50%	1,289	4.80%	8,638	32.19%	26,831
Jackson	10,299	72.95%	3,346	23.70%	472	3.34%	6,953	49.25%	14,117
Jefferson	19,795	64.25%	9,819	31.87%	1,196	3.88%	9,976	32.38%	30,810
Knox	21,363	66.84%	9,537	29.84%	1,061	3.32%	11,826	37.00%	31,961
Lake	64,089	50.76%	58,125	46.04%	4,045	3.20%	5,964	4.72%	126,259
Lawrence	18,077	68.66%	7,192	27.32%	1,060	4.03%	10,885	41.34%	26,329
Licking	55,320	58.66%	35,373	37.51%	3,616	3.83%	19,947	21.15%	94,309
Logan	16,763	71.77%	5,614	24.03%	981	4.20%	11,149	47.74%	23,358
Lorain	71,759	45.95%	79,307	50.78%	5,115	3.28%	−7,548	−4.83%	156,181
Lucas	72,544	38.38%	107,783	57.02%	8,703	4.60%	−35,239	−18.64%	189,030
Madison	13,347	65.24%	6,322	30.90%	789	3.86%	7,025	34.34%	20,458
Mahoning	54,067	48.49%	53,847	48.29%	3,585	3.22%	220	0.20%	111,499
Marion	16,763	62.59%	8,824	32.95%	1,195	4.46%	7,939	29.64%	26,782
Medina	58,915	55.92%	43,173	40.98%	3,262	3.10%	15,742	14.94%	105,350
Meigs	7,385	72.30%	2,456	24.04%	374	3.66%	4,929	48.26%	10,215
Mercer	18,432	78.54%	4,337	18.48%	1,057	4.50%	14,095	60.06%	23,826
Miami	39,225	66.72%	17,525	29.81%	2,039	3.47%	21,700	36.91%	58,789
Monroe	4,715	70.89%	1,725	25.94%	211	3.17%	2,990	44.95%	6,651
Montgomery	112,324	44.58%	130,464	51.78%	9,146	3.63%	−18,140	−7.20%	251,934
Morgan	4,587	69.07%	1,802	27.13%	252	3.79%	2,785	41.94%	6,641
Morrow	13,197	71.20%	4,610	24.87%	727	3.92%	8,587	46.33%	18,534
Muskingum	25,408	65.25%	11,852	30.44%	1,680	4.31%	13,556	34.81%	38,940
Noble	4,555	75.00%	1,316	21.67%	202	3.33%	3,239	53.33%	6,073
Ottawa	13,317	56.19%	9,460	39.92%	921	3.89%	3,857	16.27%	23,698
Paulding	6,678	72.67%	2,056	22.37%	456	4.96%	4,622	50.30%	9,190
Perry	11,626	69.32%	4,492	26.78%	654	3.90%	7,134	42.54%	16,772
Pickaway	19,613	67.51%	8,452	29.09%	986	3.39%	11,161	38.42%	29,051
Pike	8,264	68.62%	3,364	27.93%	415	3.45%	4,900	40.69%	12,043
Portage	42,163	51.27%	37,082	45.09%	3,000	3.65%	5,081	6.18%	82,245
Preble	15,806	73.41%	4,940	22.94%	785	3.65%	10,866	50.47%	21,531
Putnam	15,582	79.08%	3,573	18.13%	549	2.79%	12,009	60.95%	19,704
Richland	37,368	64.71%	18,488	32.02%	1,891	3.27%	18,880	32.69%	57,747
Ross	20,402	62.42%	11,125	34.03%	1,160	3.55%	9,277	28.39%	32,687
Sandusky	16,951	57.94%	10,782	36.86%	1,522	5.20%	6,169	21.08%	29,255
Scioto	20,509	67.20%	8,935	29.28%	1,075	3.52%	11,574	37.92%	30,519
Seneca	15,420	61.45%	8,509	33.91%	1,163	4.63%	6,911	27.54%	25,092
Shelby	19,275	76.88%	4,927	19.65%	868	3.46%	14,348	57.23%	25,070
Stark	99,365	54.67%	75,434	41.51%	6,941	3.82%	23,931	13.16%	181,740
Summit	111,573	41.13%	150,517	55.49%	9,174	3.38%	−38,944	−14.36%	271,264
Trumbull	48,755	50.97%	43,178	45.14%	3,722	3.89%	5,577	5.83%	95,655
Tuscarawas	27,395	64.25%	13,501	31.67%	1,740	4.08%	13,894	32.58%	42,636
Union	21,926	59.32%	13,719	37.12%	1,315	3.56%	8,207	22.20%	36,960
Van Wert	10,826	74.12%	3,204	21.93%	577	3.95%	7,622	52.19%	14,607
Vinton	4,018	71.76%	1,360	24.29%	221	3.95%	2,658	47.47%	5,599
Warren	84,796	61.06%	49,350	35.54%	4,726	3.40%	35,446	25.52%	138,872
Washington	19,865	65.78%	9,275	30.71%	1,061	3.51%	10,590	35.07%	30,201
Wayne	33,532	63.57%	17,313	32.82%	1,900	3.60%	16,219	30.75%	52,745
Williams	12,036	66.80%	5,043	27.99%	940	5.22%	6,993	38.81%	18,019
Wood	32,801	49.10%	31,242	46.77%	2,758	4.13%	1,559	2.33%	66,801
Wyandot	7,813	69.29%	2,996	26.57%	467	4.14%	4,817	42.72%	11,276
Totals	2,857,383	50.09%	2,650,949	46.47%	196,288	3.44%	206,434	3.62%	5,704,620

Counties that flipped from Democratic to Republican

- Ashtabula (largest city: Ashtabula)
- Erie (largest city: Sandusky)
- Lake (largest city: Mentor)
- Mahoning (largest city: Youngstown)
- Ottawa (largest city: Port Clinton)
- Portage (largest city: Kent)
- Trumbull (largest city: Warren)
- Wood (largest city: Bowling Green)

==== By congressional district ====
Moreno won nine of 15 congressional districts, with the remaining six going to Brown, including one that elected a Republican.

District	Brown	Moreno	Representative
1st	53.7%	43.1%	Greg Landsman
2nd	28.8%	67.4%	Brad Wenstrup (118th Congress)
2nd	28.8%	67.4%	David Taylor (119th Congress)
3rd	71.1%	26.4%	Joyce Beatty
4th	34.0%	62.5%	Jim Jordan
5th	38.2%	58.1%	Bob Latta
6th	36.6%	59.7%	Michael Rulli
7th	47.7%	49.4%	Max Miller
8th	39.7%	56.8%	Warren Davidson
9th	48.1%	47.4%	Marcy Kaptur
10th	48.7%	47.7%	Mike Turner
11th	78.4%	19.2%	Shontel Brown
12th	36.1%	60.3%	Troy Balderson
13th	52.1%	44.5%	Emilia Sykes
14th	44.2%	52.3%	David Joyce
15th	47.5%	49.1%	Mike Carey

== Exit poll ==
2024 Ohio U.S. Senate election voter demographics (CNN)
Demographic subgroup	Brown	Moreno	% of total vote
Ideology
Liberals	92	7	22
Moderates	58	38	41
Conservatives	8	88	37
Party
Democrats	95	4	31
Republicans	7	90	41
Independents	52	43	28
Biden job approval
Approve	96	3	40
Disapprove	15	82	59
Gender
Men	41	55	47
Women	51	45	53
Race/ethnicity
White	42	55	85
Black	89	10	8
Other	N/A	N/A	7
Gender by race
White men	38	59	41
White women	45	51	44
Black men	79	18	3
Black women	95	5	5
Age
18–29 years old	51	43	11
30–44 years old	53	43	27
45-64 years old	39	58	36
65 and older	48	49	26
Area type
Urban	64	33	31
Suburban	44	52	44
Rural	30	67	25
Education
College graduate	55	42	42
No college degree	41	55	58
Education by race
White college graduates	52	45	36
Non-white college graduates	70	28	6
Whites without college	35	61	49
Non-whites without college	73	23	10
Education by gender and race
White women with college degrees	56	41	19
White women without college degrees	38	58	26
White men with college degrees	49	49	17
White men without college degrees	31	65	23
Voters of color	72	25	15
Educational attainment
Advanced degree	61	38	18
Bachelor's degree	51	46	24
Associate's degree	38	57	15
Some college	49	48	25
Never attended college	33	63	19

== Notes ==
Partisan clients
