= MSG Sphere =

MSG Sphere may refer to:

- Sphere (venue), an indoor entertainment venue in the Las Vegas Valley
- MSG Sphere London, a proposed venue in London
