= AMC Global Media =

American entertainment company

AMC Global Media Inc.
- Formerly: AMC Networks Inc. (2011–2026)
- Type: Public
- Traded as: Nasdaq: AMCX (Class A)
- ISIN: US00164V1035
- Industry: Media; Entertainment
- Predecessor: Rainbow Media Holdings, LLC (1980–2011)
- Founded: July 1, 2011; 15 years ago
- Headquarters: New York City, United States
- Area served: Worldwide
- Key people: James L. Dolan (non-executive chairman); Kristin Dolan (CEO)
- Products: Streaming services; Cable channels; Production studio; Independent film distribution
- Brands: Acorn DVD (JV); Acorn TV; AMC; AMC+; All Reality; BBC America; Hidive; IFC; Independent Film Company; Philo (JV); RLJE Films (83%); Shudder; Sundance Now; Sundance TV; We TV; We TV+
- Revenue: ▼US$2.3 billion (2025)
- Operating income: ▲US$133 million (2025)
- Net income: ▼US$−227 million (2024)
- Total assets: ▼US$4.36 billion (2024)
- Total equity: ▼US$856 million (2024)
- Number of employees: 1,800 (2024)
- Divisions: AMC Global Media UK; AMC Global Media Central Europe; AMC Global Media Iberia & Latin America
- Subsidiaries: Independent Film Company; RLJE Films (83%); Sentai Filmworks
- Website: amcglobalmedia.com

AMC Global Media Inc. is an American independent mass media and entertainment corporation headquartered in 11 Penn Plaza, New York City. The company owns and operates the AMC cable channel, BBC America, IFC, Sundance TV, and We TV. It also owns the art house movie theater IFC Center in New York City; the independent film companies Independent Film Company and RLJE Films, the anime licensor Sentai Filmworks, the premium subscription streaming services AMC+, IFC Films Unlimited, Acorn TV, Shudder, All Reality, Sundance Now, Philo, and Hidive, and a minority interest in the Canadian production studio Shaftesbury Films.

The company formerly operated in Europe and Latin America through its international division, AMC Networks International. The current incarnation of the company, founded as a publicly traded company in July 2011 initially as AMC Networks, was the successor to the now defunct Rainbow Media Holdings, LLC (or alternately Rainbow Programming Holdings), which was originally founded in late 1980 as a subsidiary of Cablevision (which itself is also defunct), and is majority-owned and controlled by the Dolan family.

== History ==
=== Rainbow Media Holdings (1980–2011) ===
Origins of the company go back to late 1980 when its predecessor, Rainbow Media, was first founded and was initially a joint venture between the cable television companies Cablevision, Comcast, Cox Communications, and Daniels & Associates, yet its first service, a hybrid service, was launched from the partnership later around the same time on December 8, 1980, which broadcast nightly on satellite time subleased from the National Christian Network, and consisted of featured culture events from what is now Bravo on Sunday and Monday nights, and adult-oriented B movie network Escapade for the rest of the week. Due to the involvement of the four cable companies, the new service quickly gained subscribers. By July 1981, both channels expanded their offerings to seven nights a week. In August 1981, Playboy Enterprises became half-owner of Escapade which introduced a new programming block to the channel in early 1982. By the end of that year the network would relaunch as The Playboy Channel.

In the years that followed, the three other cable companies would exit the partnership, leaving Cablevision as the sole owner of Rainbow by 1983. Cablevision transferred control of its previously launched regional sports network SportsChannel New York to Rainbow. In 1983, three other regional sports networks were acquired: PRISM New England (soon to be relaunched as SportsChannel New England), Philadelphia-based PRISM, and Chicago-based SportsVision. Playboy also bought out Rainbow's share in The Playboy Channel, although it would continue to market the channel for the next few years.

Rainbow launched what would later be known as American Movie Classics (now known as AMC) in late 1984. Upon AMC's launch the network initially featured "classic" pre-1970 movies. Rainbow and Turner Broadcasting System entered into a dispute after the network launched, and Turner launched a competitor to AMC known as Turner Classic Movies. Cablevision began packaging AMC and Bravo together as the Rainbow Service. Near the end of 1984, CBS and Cablevision announced a deal to have CBS take 50% ownership in the Rainbow Service and Rainbow's marketing. The agreement also gave CBS partial ownership in the regional sports properties which had already become a joint venture with The Washington Post (the Post did not have ownership in Bravo or AMC). In 1986, Tele-Communications Inc. purchased a stake in AMC. Through this deal, the network which had 300,000 subscribers was able to greatly expand carriage to most of TCI's 3.9 million subscribers. Long Island cable news service News 12 was also launched in 1986.

CBS and Cablevision parted ways in 1987. In 1988, Rainbow's SportsChannel would make its largest programing deal, gaining national television rights for the National Hockey League. Cablevision gained a new partner that year, National Broadcasting Company, Inc. (then a subsidiary of General Electric), which obtained 50% ownership in Rainbow. Through this partnership, five additional regional sports networks were created in the Bay Area, Cincinnati, Cleveland, Philadelphia, and Los Angeles. The partnership also produced the Olympics Triplecast, a pay-per-view service providing additional coverage of the 1992 Summer Olympics.

1994 saw the launch of an American feed of the Canadian music channel MuchMusic USA, in partnership with CHUM Limited (who would launch a Canadian version of Bravo the year after), and the Independent Film Channel. Years later would CHUM sell their stake to Rainbow in 2000 and revoked their license for the MuchMusic name, which culminated into a rebrand as Fuse in 2003. Fuse became a part of MSG Media in 2010, and has since been spun off as Fuse Media.

In 1997, Romance Classics, which is now We TV, a channel that had been in planning for over five years and had its launch date pushed back multiple times, was finally launched. But Rainbow's largest venture that year was the merger of SportsChannel into Fox Sports Net. Rainbow retained varying ownership interests in all of the former SportsChannel networks except PRISM and SportsChannel Philadelphia, which were both shut down to make way for the first Comcast SportsNet. Over the next decade, all of these networks except SportsChannel NY (then Fox Sports New York) were gradually sold off. Fox Sports New York was then transferred to the MSG Media division and rebranded MSG+.

Rainbow ran the local-minded MSG Metro Channels which launched in 1998, before folding them in late 2005.

Through a series of transactions, beginning in 1997, NBC's stake was eventually reduced. In 2002, Cablevision sold its share of Bravo to NBC and as part of the deal, NBC gave up its then 20% share in Rainbow.

2003 saw Rainbow DBS Company launch a DBS satellite service, the HDTV-oriented Voom. The service ceased operations on April 30, 2005, and instead several of Voom's HD channels were launched on Dish Network and Cablevision, now bannered as Voom HD Networks. The networks were discontinued in 2009.

In 2005, Cablevision considered spinning off Rainbow Media as a publicly traded company, and making their core cable business private, but withdrew the plan. In 2006, a new plan emerged to privatize all of Cablevision, including Rainbow Media. In January 2007, with no word on if the privatization would go through, Liberty Media expressed interest in acquiring Rainbow Media from Cablevision. In June 2008, Rainbow acquired the Sundance Channel from NBCUniversal, CBS, and Robert Redford. Rainbow Media also owned Wedding Central which was shut down the same day AMC Global Media (then known as AMC Networks) went public.

=== AMC Networks (2011–2026) ===
Initial logo used from its founding until January 2021.

==== 2011–2020 ====
On March 10, 2011, Rainbow Media's parent company, Cablevision, as approved by its board on December 16, 2010, announced that it would be spinning off all of Rainbow Media's assets into a new publicly traded company now known as AMC Networks, which would replace and become the successor to Rainbow Media later in 2011, and, as said in 2005, making their core cable business private. Rainbow Media's former President Josh Sapan initially served the president and chief executive of the newly established AMC Networks which went public on July 1, 2011.

On May 4, 2012, Dish Network announced that it would no longer carry the AMC Networks family of cable channels upon the expiration of the satellite provider's distribution agreement with the company at the end of June 2012, citing that AMC Networks charged an excessive amount in retransmission consent payments from the service for their carriage and low audience viewership for the channels.

AMC Networks responded to Dish Network's announcement of its pending removal of the channels as being related to a 2008 breach of contract lawsuit against Dish Network by the company's former Voom HD Networks subsidiary (under the company's previous Rainbow Media Holdings brand) (which awaited trial in the New York State Supreme Court), in which it sought more than $2.5 billion in damages against Dish Network for improperly terminating its carriage contract; Voom's high-definition channels were carried on the provider from May 1, 2005, until May 12, 2008, when Dish removed ten of Voom's fifteen channels from its lineup and the five remaining channels the following day. Dish Network stated that the lawsuit was unrelated to the decision to remove the AMC Networks channels and that it ended the carriage agreement on its own terms.

On May 20, 2012, Dish Network removed Sundance Channel from its channel lineup. Two weeks later on June 4, 2012, Dish relocated AMC, WEtv, and IFC to higher channel positions with AMC being split into two separate standard definition and high definition channel feeds (AMC moved from channel 130 to channel 9609 for the SD feed and 9610 for the HD feed, WEtv moved from channel 128 to channel 9608 and IFC was moved from channel 393 to channel 9607); the former channel lineup spaces occupied by the three channels were respectively replaced with HDNet, Style and MoviePlex multiplex channel Indieplex. The move is believed to be in response to an ad run during a June 3 airing of an episode of Mad Men urging Dish Network customers to inform the company to keep the three AMC Networks channels on the satellite provider, with Dish Network stating that the relocated channel positions better reflect the channels' ratings.

On July 1, 2012, Dish Network dropped AMC, We TV, and IFC from the channel line-up altogether.

On July 12, 2012, AMC said in an e-mailed statement that it would stream over the Internet the season premiere of Breaking Bad to Dish customers. "Dish subscribers can register online starting July 13 for the show, which airs on July 15. We want to give Dish customers an extra week to switch providers so they can enjoy the rest of the season."

On October 21, 2012, AMC Networks announced a settlement was reached between them, Cablevision and Dish in which Dish was forced to pay up to $700 million in damages to Cablevision for damages from removing Voom owned channels off the Dish lineup back in 2008, and in return Dish signed a new agreement to bring the AMC Networks owned channels back on the Dish lineup with AMC returning October 21 and the rest on November 1.

From 2013 to 2015, the company acquired or joined a joint venture each year. On October 28, 2013, AMC Networks announced it would acquire most of Chellomedia, sans Chello Benelux, an international operator of cable networks, from Liberty Global for around $1.04 billion. On October 23, 2014, AMC confirmed it had purchased a 49.9% stake in BBC America, with BBC Studios retaining the remaining share of the network. In 2015, AMC Networks, along with Upfront Ventures, Daher Capital, Northgate Ventures, invested a round of funding in the Latin YouTube network MiTú.

In 2016, AMC Networks finalized a partnership agreement with former BET founder Robert L. Johnson's RLJ Company. According to the agreement, AMC will use its programming and distribution clout to benefit Acorn and UMC. Additionally, the RLJ-AMC partnership will allow for greater investment in content from African-American creatives, Johnson emphasized. The agreement called for AMC to provide RLJ with a $60 million loan on a seven-year term and $5 million on a one-year term. AMC has received warrants to purchase at least 20 million shares or the equivalent of 50.1% of the company. The time frame for exercising those warrants is open-ended, AMC said.

On November 15, 2016, AMC acquired a minority stake in comedy video website and film and television production company Funny or Die, with plans to integrate it with IFC.

On April 27, 2018, the company, as the owner of IFC, acquired a majority stake in comedy venue operator Levity Live.

On July 30, 2018, AMC Networks reached a definitive agreement to acquire RLJ Entertainment where AMC would pay $59 million for the remaining RLJE shares not owned by AMC or Robert L. Johnson. The transaction was approved by RLJ Entertainment's stockholders on October 31, and AMC Networks completed the acquisition on November 1. RLJ Entertainment became a privately owned subsidiary of AMC Networks, with Johnson and his affiliates owning a 17% stake.

In 2019, AMC Networks and the New Zealand public broadcaster TVNZ entered into an agreement to jointly produce The Dead Lands, a Māori–theme supernatural series set in pre-contact New Zealand. The series was distributed by AMC's streaming service Shudder in the US, Canada, UK, and Ireland and by TVNZ On Demand in New Zealand.

Second logo used from January 2021 to April 2026.

==== 2020–2025 ====
In early 2020, the AMC Networks involved Switzer Group to lead the redesign of its tenth-floor headquarters at 11 Penn Plaza, New York.

On May 13, 2020, AMC Networks announced it was acquiring the rights to Anne Rice's major literary works, including The Vampire Chronicles and Lives of the Mayfair Witches.

In September 2020, executive chairman Charles Dolan retired from his position, moving to a chairman emeritus role. His son, James L. Dolan, was then named chairman of AMC Networks.

On February 2, 2021, AMC Networks entered into a strategic partnership with Canadian production company Shaftesbury Films. AMC made an investment in the company, thus giving them access to the latter's slate and expanding their content and development capabilities in Canada.

In December 2021, AMC Networks acquired American anime company Sentai Holdings, which includes the distributor Sentai Filmworks, the Anime Network, and the HIDIVE streaming service, which was then announced a month later on January 5, 2022. This came months after Sony's Funimation (then a joint venture between its US-based Sony Pictures Television and Sony Music Entertainment Japan's Aniplex units) acquired Crunchyroll from AT&T's WarnerMedia in August 2021. The acquisition between the companies would cause some of Sentai's titles to leave Crunchyroll on a couple months later on March 31.

On March 1, 2022, AMC Networks announced the launch of its book publishing division, AMC Networks Publishing, and then announced that it would launch several more FAST channels a month later. Throughout late 2022, the company had rapid changes in its leadership until Kristin Dolan was appointed CEO in early 2023. AMC bought the entirety of BBC America in 2024, although the BBC continues to maintain commercial ties with the channel.

In February 2025, the company reported a $269 million impairment charge on its U.S. cable networks in its fourth-quarter 2024 earnings report, citing a broader decline in their market value. The write-down affected channels including AMC, BBC America, IFC, SundanceTV, We TV, and IFC Films. Domestic streaming revenue increased by 8%, raising the company's total number of streaming subscribers to 12.4 million. International revenue declined by 14%, while subscription revenue fell by 5%. Adjusted earnings per share were $0.64, with total revenue down nearly 12% year-over-year to $599 million.

In November 2025, AMC launched All Reality, a new streaming service dedicated to reality television-based programming. A month later in December 2025, the company announced that it would begin airing professional wrestling promotion Total Nonstop Action Wrestling's flagship show, TNA Impact!, on AMC on January 15, 2026.

=== AMC Global Media (2026–present) ===
TNA Wrestling's weekly program TNA iMPACT! premiered live on AMC on January 15, 2026, beginning the promotion's multi-year television agreement with the network.

In February 2026, the company reported that streaming revenue in its Domestic Operations segment had increased 12% in 2025 to $677 million. The segment had 10.4 million streaming subscribers at the end of 2025, unchanged from the previous year.

AMC Networks Inc. changed its corporate name to AMC Global Media Inc. on April 8, 2026. The name change reflected the company's shift toward streaming and program production. In an interview, AMC Global Media chief content officer and president of AMC Studios Dan McDermott expressed interest in adding more sports-related programming. On April 29, 2026, AMC announced that it had greenlit Thunder Road, a scripted drama developed with NASCAR Studios and starring Dennis Quaid. The company also greenlit Rise of the Saints, a new installment of its Rise sports documentary series, scheduled to premiere in February 2027.

In September 2026, MACRO Media announced that it had acquired the Allblk streaming service from AMC Global Media.

== Units ==
Category	Name
Television Channels	AMC
Television Channels	BBC America
Television Channels	IFC
Television Channels	Sundance TV
Television Channels	We TV
Streaming Services	AMC+
Streaming Services	Acorn TV (with RLJ Companies)
Streaming Services	All Reality
Streaming Services	BritBox
Streaming Services	Philo (with Skydance and A+E Global Media)
Streaming Services	Hidive
Streaming Services	Shudder
Streaming Services	Sundance Now
Streaming Services	We TV+
Other Units	Independent Film Company
Other Units	Acorn DVD (with RLJ Companies)
Other Units	RLJE Films (with RLJ Companies)
Other Units	Sentai Studios
Other Units	Sentai Filmworks

=== FAST channels ===
A list of AMC-branded FAST channels available on third-party streaming platforms.

- Allblk Gems
- AMC en Español
- AMC Showcase
- AMC Thriller
- Anime x HIDIVE
- IFC Films Picks
- IFC Slightly Off
- Stories by AMC
- The Walking Dead Universe
- WE tv All Reality
- WE tv All Weddings

=== Other assets ===
- MiTú (investment)
- Levity Live (majority stake)
- Shaftesbury Films (minority stake)
- Sentai Filmworks
- AMC Networks Publishing

==== BBC America ====
On October 23, 2014, AMC confirmed it had purchased a 49.9% stake in BBC America, with BBC Studios retaining the remaining share of the network. The joint venture gave AMC, which also distributes the BBC World News channel in the United States, operational control of BBC America, which was managed separately from AMC's other channels. AMC Networks acquired BBC Studios' remaining 50.1% stake in the BBC America joint venture on November 1, 2024, for $42 million, becoming the channel's sole owner with full operational control. The companies maintained a commercial relationship concerning BBC America's branding and programming.

=== Former assets ===
- Allblk, acquired by MACRO Media in 2026
- Anime Network
- Bravo acquired by NBC in 2002 for $1.25 billion.
- Funny or Die
- MuchMusic USA with CHUM Limited; became Fuse on May 19, 2003; spun off as a part of The Madison Square Garden Company in 2010; spun off as part of spun off further in 2014 as Fuse Media, LLC.
- News 12 Networks
- Escapade/The Playboy Channel
- SportsChannel (joint-venture, later Fox Sports Networks/Bally Sports/FanDuel Sports Network)
- Voom HD Networks
- Wedding Central shuttered July 1, 2011; programming moved to WE tv, and website redirects to WE tv's weddings section.
