= Paul Dolan (baseball) =

American sports executive (born 1958)

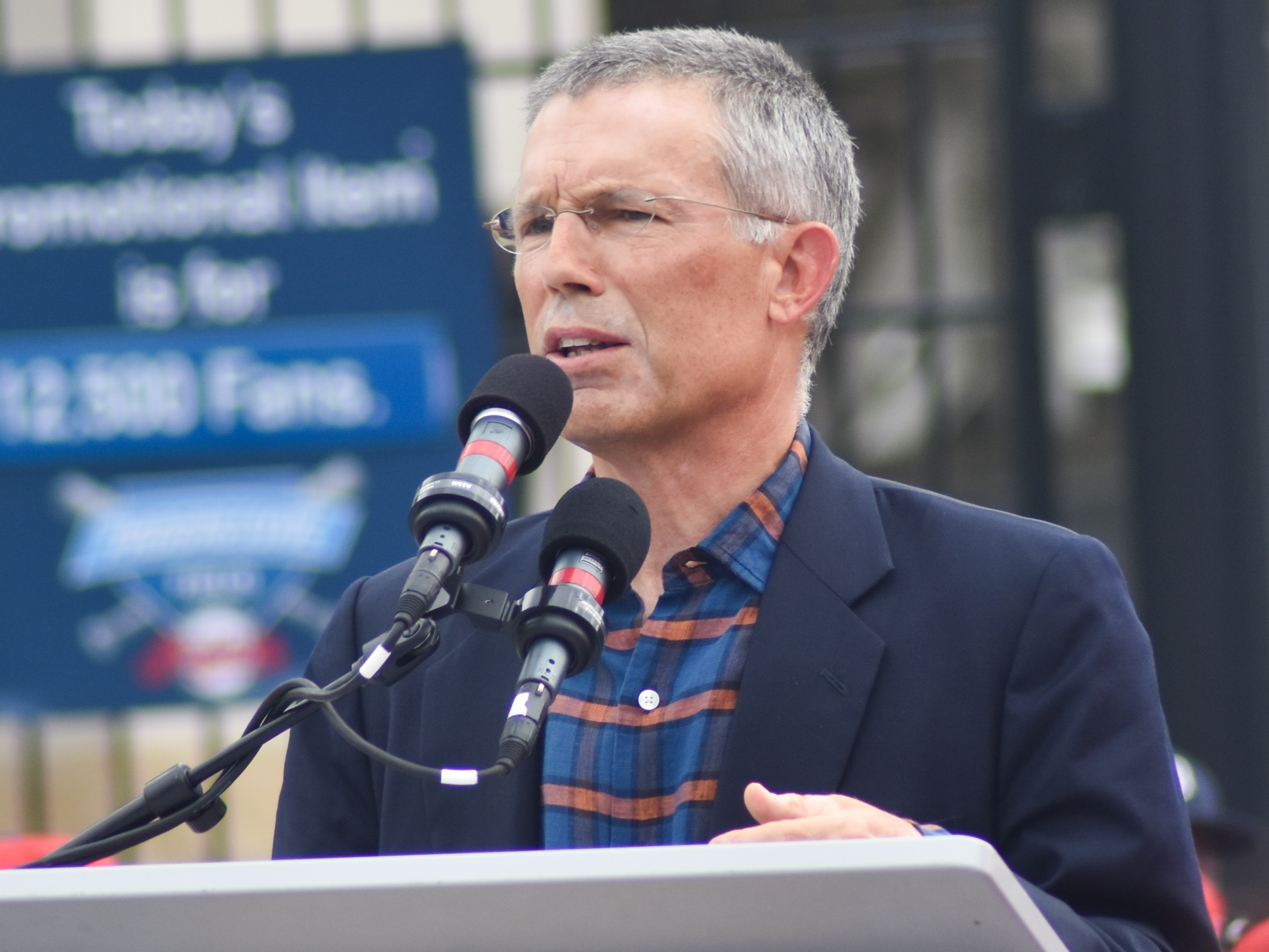
- Dolan at the Larry Doby statue unveiling ceremony in 2015
- Born: Paul Joseph Dolan; July 7, 1958 (age 68); Chardon, Ohio, U.S.
- Occupation: Attorney
- Known for: Cleveland Guardians Owner/Chairman/CEO
- Children: Peter Dolan and Lawrence Dolan
- Father: Larry Dolan
- Relatives: Charles Dolan (uncle); Matt Dolan (brother); James Dolan (cousin)
- Website: www.mlb.com/guardians

Paul Joseph Dolan (born July 7, 1958) is an American attorney and Major League Baseball (MLB) team executive who is the owner, chairman, and chief executive officer (CEO) of the Cleveland Guardians. Dolan is also the "control person" for the team.

== Early life ==
Dolan was born and raised in the Cleveland, Ohio suburb of Chardon, as one of six children of Larry and Eva Dolan. Dolan attended high school at Gilmour Academy in Gates Mills, Ohio, and upon graduation attended college at St. Lawrence University, and upon graduation went on to earn his Juris Doctor at Notre Dame Law School in 1983.

== Career ==
After graduating from law school, Dolan was hired as an attorney for his father's law firm (Thrasher, Dinsmore, and Dolan), eventually becoming a partner in 1992.

In 2000, Larry Dolan purchased the Cleveland Guardians (then Indians) baseball team. Upon his father taking control of the team, Dolan was hired as a vice president and general counsel. In 2004, Dolan was promoted to team president, and in 2011 promoted again to chairman/CEO.

In 2013, Dolan was approved by the team owners of MLB as the "control person" of the Guardians; the Associated Press describes this new role as "controlling owner". This new designation means that Dolan oversees the day to day team operations, and is responsible for compliance with MLB rules and regulations.

Though officially listed as Owner/Chairman/CEO by the team, as the team is considered to be a family asset due to being purchased through various Dolan Family trusts. Dolan's father, who was still regarded as official owner of the Cleveland Guardians, died in February 2025. At this time, MLB reported that Paul was "the only one of" Larry Dolan's "six children to be that closely involved in the baseball team."

== Family ==
Dolan's son Peter was selected by the Guardians in the 33rd round of the 2014 MLB draft as a third baseman out of Gilmour Academy. His brother Matt was a state senator in Ohio, and his cousin James is owner of the New York Knicks of the National Basketball Association (NBA), and the New York Rangers of the National Hockey League (NHL).

== Awards and honors ==
(as a member of the Guardians ownership and front office)

- American League champion (2016)
- 9x American League Central division champion (2001, 2007, 2016–2018, 2022, and 2024–2026)
