= Marc Copely =

American rock and blues guitarist and songwriter

Marc Copely is an American rock and blues guitarist and songwriter.

Described as "...a working-class hero of stadium-sized potential", Copely has been performing since the age of 19. The Worcester, Massachusetts born musician, launched his professional career by performing with B.B. King, James Montgomery, and James Cotton.

Copely is also known for his songwriting. He co-wrote "Breathe Into You" with Carole King, "Something Beautiful" with Tracy Bonham and Greg Wells and "Little White Lies", featured in the 2011 Weinstein film Butter. Most recently, his co-write "Midnight Run", was featured in the Weinstein film Lawless, sung by Willie Nelson.

Copely has released two solo albums: Limited Lifetime Guarantee (2002) via RCA Records and Harp & Plow (2009) via United For Opportunity. Songs from these albums have been featured on the Late Show with David Letterman, The Tonight Show with Jay Leno, Late Night with Conan O'Brien, Brothers & Sisters and Grey's Anatomy. "Harp & Plow" was chosen as an Editors' Pick in the June 2010 issue of Guitar Player magazine. Other original music has been heard on Pawn Stars, Cajun Pawn Stars, American Restoration, NY Ink, Psychic Kids, and The Fosters.

Copely has toured in recent years as guitarist with Rosanne Cash, Billy Squier, and opened for Don Henley, Joe Walsh, and the Eagles on separate tours with JD & the Straight Shot, joined by Keith Urban and the Dixie Chicks. He has shared the stage and studio in diverse collaborations with artists like Robert Randolph, Bono and the Edge, Linda Eder, Indian percussionist/producer Karsh Kale, Maiysha, The East Village Opera Company and Handel's Messiah Rocks with the Boston Pops orchestra, under the direction of Keith Lockhart. He performed on Dancing with the Stars and the American Music Awards with Enrique Iglesias in 2011.

In the summer of 2009, Copely embarked on a national tour as guitarist with Billy Squier. He later opened with JD & the Straight Shot for the Eagles and Don Henley, joined by Keith Urban and the Dixie Chicks.

Copely can be prominently seen in New Year's Eve, playing alongside Jon Bon Jovi in the fictitious rock band Jensen.

Copely co-produced and performed on the Righteous Brothers song "Unchained Melody" for Constantine Maroulis (American Idol, Rock of Ages) for his live guest appearance performance on American Idol.
