= Matt Dolan =

American politician (born 1965)

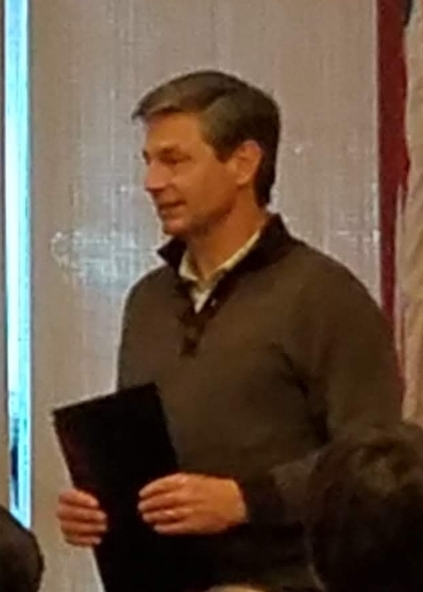
- Dolan in 2020

Member of the Ohio Senate from the 24th district
- In office January 1, 2017 – December 31, 2024
- Preceded by: Tom Patton
- Succeeded by: Tom Patton

Member of the Ohio House of Representatives from the 98th district
- In office January 1, 2005 – January 19, 2010
- Preceded by: Tim Grendell
- Succeeded by: Richard Hollington

Personal details
- Born: Matthew John Dolan; January 12, 1965 (age 61) Chardon, Ohio, U.S.
- Party: Republican
- Parent: Larry Dolan (father)
- Relatives: Charles Dolan (uncle); Paul Dolan (brother); James Dolan (cousin)
- Education: Boston College (BA); Case Western Reserve University (JD)

Matthew John Dolan (born January 12, 1965) is an American politician and lawyer who served in the Ohio Senate from 2017 to 2024, representing the state's 24th district. Prior, served in the state's House of Representatives, representing its 98th district from 2005 to 2010. Since February 2025, he has been the CEO of Team NEO, an economic development organization for Northeast Ohio.

Dolan's father Larry bought the Cleveland Guardians in 2000 and gave Matt a partial stake in the Major League Baseball team. Prior to his election victory in 2016, Dolan was part of the team's front office, overseeing the budget and also running the team's charity program.

On September 20, 2021, he announced his candidacy in the 2022 United States Senate election in Ohio. He ran as a traditional Republican and was the only candidate that did not put his full support behind Donald Trump during the campaign. He lost the Republican primary, coming in third place, receiving 23% of the vote. On January 17, 2023, he announced his candidacy in the 2024 United States Senate election in Ohio. He lost the Republican primary again, coming in second place with 32% of the vote.

== Early life and career ==
Dolan was born and raised in Chardon, Ohio, and is a graduate of Gilmour Academy. He earned a Bachelor of Arts degree in history from Boston College and a Juris Doctor from the Case Western Reserve University School of Law. Forbes ranked the extended Dolan family as the 54th richest in the United States in 2015, with most of its wealth attributed to his uncle Charles' investments in cable television.

An attorney, Dolan is a former chief assistant prosecutor for Geauga County and assistant attorney general for the State of Ohio. He is a partner at the law firm of Thrasher, Dinsmore & Dolan. Matt's cousin James Dolan is the owner of New York Knicks of the NBA.

== Politics ==
=== Ohio House of Representatives ===
In 2004, Dolan was elected to represent the 98th District in the Ohio House of Representatives, and was re-elected in 2006 and 2008. He resigned in January 2010 to focus on a run for Cuyahoga County Executive. On November 2, 2010, he lost to Lakewood mayor Ed FitzGerald.

=== Ohio Senate ===
After taking a break from politics to work in the Indians' front office, in 2016, Dolan opted to make a comeback by running to succeed state Senator Tom Patton, who was term-limited that year after serving in the Senate for over eight years. A competitive seat on paper, the 24th District had been held by Republicans for over thirty years, which created a competitive primary. For the Republican nomination, Dolan faced sitting state representatives Nan Baker and Mike Dovilla. However, his name recognition and large personal wealth put him over the edge, and he won the nomination with 44% of the vote, to Baker's 29% and Dovilla's 27%.

While the general election was at first deemed competitive, it did not prove to be in the end. Facing Emily Hagan, an assistant county prosecutor and the niece of former Cuyahoga County commissioner and gubernatorial candidate Tim Hagan, Dolan won with over 58% of the vote. He was sworn into office on January 3, 2017. In 2020, Dolan was reelected with 54% of the vote, beating Democrat Tom Jackson.

Term-limited and having lost his 2024 U.S. Senate primary bid, Dolan's second term in the Ohio Senate ended on December 31, 2024.

=== 2022 U.S. Senate bid ===
On September 20, 2021, Dolan declared his bid in the 2022 United States Senate election in Ohio. He ran as a traditional Republican whom Ohio Republicans have tended to elect in statewide elections including Rob Portman, George Voinovich, and Mike DeWine. Dolan was the only candidate who did not put his full support behind Donald Trump during the campaign, but he was sure to explain that he voted for Trump in 2016 and 2020. On March 21, 2022, during a debate between the Republican candidates running for Senate in 2022, Dolan was the only candidate to raise his hand when they were asked if Trump should "stop talking about the 2020 election". Despite Dolan's poll numbers surging during the last days of the primary campaign, Dolan ultimately lost the primary. He came in third (behind venture capitalist JD Vance and former state treasurer Josh Mandel) with 23.3% of the vote, carrying only three counties: Cuyahoga (his home county), Geauga, and Franklin.

=== 2024 U.S Senate bid ===
On January 17, 2023, Dolan announced his bid for the 2024 United States Senate election in Ohio, challenging incumbent Sherrod Brown. Dolan has said that his reasoning for announcing his campaign early is to get more name recognition. Dolan was defeated in the primary with about 33% of the popular vote.

== Political positions ==
=== Abortion ===
Dolan is opposed to abortion. However, he supports exceptions for rape, incest and health of the mother. During his time in the legislature, he opposed a bill that banned abortion in Ohio after six weeks because of the absence of exceptions.

== Electoral history ==
Republican primary results, 2004
Party	Candidate	Votes	%
Republican	Matt Dolan	7,406	60.87%
Republican	Doland F. Welker	4,761	39.13%
Total votes		12,167	100.00%

Ohio's 98th House of Representatives district general election, 2004
Party	Candidate	Votes	%
Republican	Matt Dolan	36,243	65.21%
Democratic	Dan Dombek	19,336	34.79%
Total votes		55,579	100.00%
Republican hold			

Republican primary results, 2006
Party	Candidate	Votes	%
Republican	Matt Dolan (incumbent)	8,455	100.00%
Total votes		8,455	100.00%

Ohio's 98th House of Representatives district general election, 2006
Party	Candidate	Votes	%
Republican	Matt Dolan (incumbent)	26,518	56.69%
Democratic	Raymond Ku	20,257	43.31%
Total votes		46,775	100.00%
Republican hold			

Republican primary results, 2008
Party	Candidate	Votes	%
Republican	Matt Dolan (incumbent)	9,761	100.00%
Total votes		9,761	100.00%

Ohio's 98th House of Representatives district general election, 2008
Party	Candidate	Votes	%
Republican	Matt Dolan (incumbent)	42,806	100.00%
Total votes		42,806	100.00%
Republican hold			

Cuyahoga County commissioner general election, 2010
Party	Candidate	Votes	%
Democratic	Ed FitzGerald	188,474	45.73%
Republican	Matt Dolan	124,719	30.26%
Independent	Ken Lanci	47,110	11.43%
Independent	Tim McCormack	33,760	8.19%
Independent	Don Scipione	11,897	2.89%
Green	David Ellison	6,193	1.5%
Total votes		412,153	100.00%
Democratic win (new seat)			

Republican primary results, 2016
Party	Candidate	Votes	%
Republican	Matt Dolan	24,844	44.41%
Republican	Nan Baker	16,241	29.03%
Republican	Mike Dovilla	14,860	26.56%
Total votes		55,945	100.00%

Ohio's 24th Senate district general election, 2016
Party	Candidate	Votes	%
Republican	Matt Dolan	107,500	58.14%
Democratic	Emily Hagan	77,383	41.86%
Total votes		184,883	100.00%
Republican hold			

Republican primary results, 2020
Party	Candidate	Votes	%
Republican	Matt Dolan (incumbent)	18,161	100.00%
Total votes		18,161	100.00%

Ohio's 24th Senate district general election, 2020
Party	Candidate	Votes	%
Republican	Matt Dolan (incumbent)	112,609	54.3%
Democratic	Tom Jackson	94,633	45.7%
Total votes		207,242	100.00%
Republican hold			

2022 United States Senate election in Ohio, Republican primary results
Party	Candidate	Votes	%
Republican	JD Vance	344,736	32.22%
Republican	Josh Mandel	255,854	23.92%
Republican	Matt Dolan	249,239	23.30%
Republican	Mike Gibbons	124,653	11.65%
Republican	Jane Timken	62,779	5.87%
Republican	Mark Pukita	22,692	2.12%
Republican	Neil Patel	9,873	0.92%
Total votes		1,069,826	100.00%

2024 United States Senate election in Ohio, Republican primary results
Party	Candidate	Votes	%
Republican	Bernie Moreno	557,626	50.48%
Republican	Matt Dolan	363,013	32.86%
Republican	Frank LaRose	184,111	16.67%
Total votes		1,104,750	100.00%
