= Kristin Dolan =

American media executive

Kristin Dolan is an American executive. Dolan is currently the Chief Executive Officer at AMC Global Media, Inc. AMC Global Media consists of AMC+, Acorn TV, Shudder, Sundance Now, ALLBLK and HIDIVE; cable networks AMC, BBC AMERICA, IFC, SundanceTV and We TV; film distribution labels Independent Film Company and RLJE Films; AMC Studios, and AMC Networks International; and its FAST Channels.

== Early life and education ==
Dolan was born in Norristown, Pennsylvania. She graduated from State University of New York at Albany with a degree in English and a business minor in 1988. She went to grad school at Pace University, earning a Masters in publishing in 1990. Later, after she'd had children, she got a Masters in English Literature from Long Island University.

== Career ==
Dolan's first internship, in 1990, was at American Movie Classics, which was then known as Rainbow Media. After college, she got a job as a marketing manager at AMC. In 1996, Dolan began working at Cablevision. In 2004, she was Cablevision Systems Senior VP, Digital Product Management. In 2008, she ran marketing for Fuse, returning to Cablevision to become Executive Vice President of Product Management and Marketing in 2011. She was named President of Optimum Services in 2013, and became Cablevision's Chief Operating Officer in 2014. Dolan left Cablevision when it was sold to Altice USA for 17.7 billion dollars in 2016.

In 2016, Dolan and her husband James Dolan founded Dolan Family Ventures. Later that year, she founded 605, the audience measurement and data analytics firm, where she led all day-to-day business operations including key client relationships, product development, sales, research, finance, legal and marketing. 605 was sold to iSpot TV in 2023.

In 2023, Dolan became CEO of AMC Networks.

Dolan is a member of the Board of Directors for NCTA, The Paley Center for Media, The Syndeo Institute at The Cable Center, Sphere Entertainment, and The Wendy’s Company. She also serves on the President’s Councils for the University at Albany and Pace University.

In 2025, Dolan was inducted into the Broadcasting and Cable Hall of Fame. She has also won an NCTA Vanguard award, a Multichannel News Wonder Woman Award, and named as a Cable TV Pioneers.

== Personal life ==
Dolan married James Dolan in 2002. They have two sons together.
