= Larry Dolan =

American attorney (1931–2025)

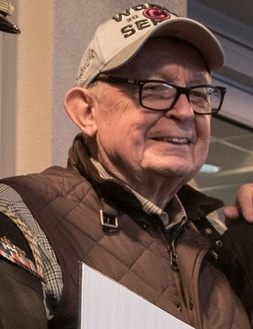
- Dolan in 2016
- Born: Lawrence John Dolan; February 8, 1931; Cleveland Heights, Ohio, U.S.
- Died: February 23, 2025 (aged 94); Cleveland, Ohio, U.S.
- Title: Cleveland Guardians principal owner Founder of SportsTime Ohio
- Spouse: Eva Haas Dolan (m. 1957)
- Children: 6, including Matt and Paul
- Relatives: Charles Dolan (brother); James Dolan (nephew)

Lawrence John Dolan (February 8, 1931 – February 23, 2025) was an American attorney who was the principal owner of the Cleveland Guardians of the Major League Baseball (MLB) from 2000 until his death in 2025 and the founder of SportsTime Ohio (now FanDuel Sports Network Great Lakes).

== Early life and education ==
Dolan was born on February 8, 1931, in Cleveland Heights, Ohio, the son of Corinne (née Henson) and David Dolan, an inventor who sold a patent to the Ford Motor Company. He attended St. Ignatius High School and got his law degree from University of Notre Dame in 1956. He also received an honorary Doctor of Laws degree from Cleveland State University.

== Professional career ==
Upon leaving Notre Dame, Dolan served in the United States Marine Corps for two years, where he attained the rank of first lieutenant. Upon leaving the Marine Corps in 1958, Dolan worked as assistant prosecutor in Geauga County, Ohio, before going into private practice. He eventually became president and managing partner of Thrasher, Dinsmore & Dolan in Chardon, Ohio.

== Cleveland Guardians owner ==
In 2000, Dolan (through a family trust) bought the Cleveland Guardians (then Indians) of Major League Baseball (MLB) for $323 million from Richard E. Jacobs, who, along with his late brother David H. Jacobs, had paid $35 million for the club in 1986. Jacobs had taken the team public in 1997. As part of the deal, Dolan bought all of the stock at just over $12 a share, making the franchise privately held once again. During his time as owner, the team experienced periods of competitiveness, including playoff runs in 2007 and 2013, and making it to the World Series in 2016, as well as periods without success, including several seasons with over 90 losses.

While the team's player salaries were among the highest in MLB during Jacobs's final years as owner, at times they have been among the lowest under Dolan. This led some fans to regard Dolan as miserly, although other fans dispute the reputation. After the team reached the 2016 World Series, the team acquired free agents Edwin Encarnación and Boone Logan. However, both of these players were with other teams by 2019 in an attempt to reduce payroll, thus adding to both sides of the “miserly” argument between fans.

In 2006, Dolan started SportsTime Ohio to broadcast the team's games; in 2012, it was sold to Fox Entertainment Group.

In November 2021, the baseball team officially changed its name to the Cleveland Guardians.

At the time of his death in February 2025, Dolan and his family were the longest tenured ownership group in the team's franchise history. His son Paul, who has held ownership duties and the title of "Owner/CEO/Chairman" of the Cleveland Guardians since 2013, is also the only one of Larry J. Dolan's six children to have held major leadership roles with the team.

== Personal life and death ==
Dolan married Eva Haas Dolan in 1957 and they went on to have six children; among them are Matt who was an Ohio state senator and is now an economic development leader in Northeast Ohio, and Paul who worked for Larry's law firm and was since named as president, and later chairman, CEO, and controlling owner of the baseball team.

Dolan had three brothers, including businessman Charles Dolan. His nephew James Dolan owns the New York Knicks of the NBA and the New York Rangers of the NHL.

Dolan died in Cleveland on February 23, 2025, at the age of 94.

== Awards and honors ==
- Greater Cleveland Sports Hall of Fame inductee (class of 2014)
