= Charles Dolan =

American billionaire businessman (1926–2024)

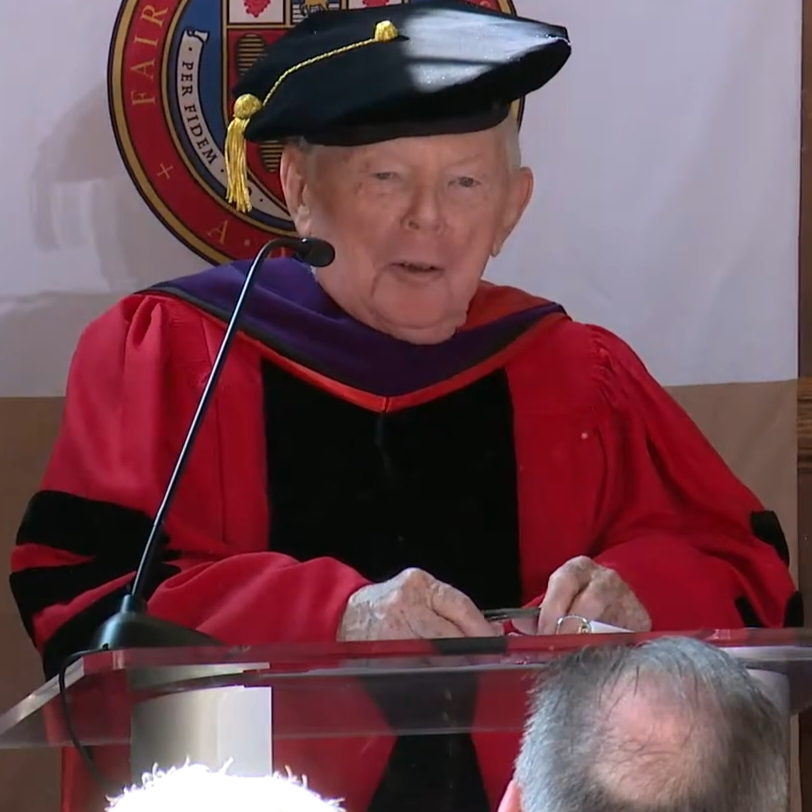
- Dolan in 2016
- Born: Charles Francis Dolan; October 16, 1926; Cleveland, Ohio, U.S.
- Died: December 28, 2024 (aged 98)
- Education: John Carroll University (dropped out)
- Title: Founder of Cablevision and HBO
- Spouse: Helen Ann Dolan (m. 1951; died 2023)
- Children: 6, including James L.
- Relatives: Larry J. Dolan (brother); Paul J. Dolan (nephew); Matt Dolan (nephew)
- Military career
- Allegiance: United States
- Branch: United States Army Air Forces
- Conflicts: World War II

Charles Francis Dolan (October 16, 1926 – December 28, 2024) was an American billionaire businessman and media mogul, best known as founder of Cablevision and HBO. Today, the Dolan family controls Madison Square Garden Sports, MSG Networks, Madison Square Garden Entertainment, Madison Square Garden, the Sphere, Radio City Music Hall, BBC America, and AMC Networks. As of December 2024, his net worth was estimated at US$5.4 billion.

== Early life ==
Dolan was born in Cleveland, Ohio, on October 16, 1926. He was of Irish Catholic descent. He was the son of Corinne (Henson) and David Dolan, an inventor who sold a patent to the Ford Motor Company. He served in the United States Army Air Forces at the end of World War II and studied at John Carroll University, before dropping out and entering the telecommunications field.

== Career ==
Dolan's earliest professional endeavors focused on the packaging, marketing, and distribution of sports and industrial films, which he produced with his wife in their Cleveland home and then sold to televisions stations which syndicated the material. Dolan sold his interests to Telenews in exchange for a job, and when he was 26 years old, he moved to New York City and founded Teleguide Inc, a service that provided information to hotels.

In the 1960s, Dolan founded Sterling Manhattan Cable, the first company to wire buildings to have cable television access. In its early years, Sterling forged first-of-its-kind agreements to bring New York professional sports teams, cultural programming, and movies into the homes of New York City cable viewers, including agreements with the New York Knicks and New York Rangers. Two years later, he sold Sterling Cable's Manhattan operations to Time Inc. and renamed his Long Island business Cablevision Systems.

In the early 1970s, Dolan founded Home Box Office, the first premium programming service in the cable television industry, which he sold to Time Life. Later, he organized Cablevision Systems Corporation on Long Island and spearheaded many of the company's advancements. After that, he was the vision behind VOOM, Cablevision's effort to expand content delivery and meet the demands of the exploding HDTV market, which was expected to include six million households by the end of 2003 and 12 million by year-end 2005, but was shut down when other directors deemed it financially unsustainable.

From 2001 through early 2002, Dolan was a bidder in the sale of the Boston Red Sox. He submitted a maximum bid of $750 million, but ultimately lost out to a group headed by John Henry, Tom Werner, and Larry Lucchino.

In 2016, Dolan sold Cablevision to Patrick Drahi's Altice USA for $17.7 billion.

In 2017, Dolan and his wife Helen were co-recipients of the Double Helix Medal with Tom Brokaw.

== Personal life and death ==
Dolan and his wife resided in Oyster Bay, New York. They had six children, including James L. Dolan, who is executive chairman of the Madison Square Garden Sports and its professional sports teams, the New York Knicks and New York Rangers, and Patrick Dolan, principal owner and publisher of Newsday.

Dolan's younger brother, Larry J. Dolan, and his nephew, Paul J. Dolan, co-owned the Cleveland Guardians from 2000 to 2025. His other nephew, Matt Dolan, is a Republican politician who formerly served in the Ohio Senate. Larry died two months after Charles in February 2025. However, Paul remains the lead owner of the Guardians.

He was married to Helen Ann Dolan from 1951 until her death in 2023. Dolan died on December 28, 2024, at the age of 98.

=== Politics ===
Dolan and his wife contributed $125,000 to Donald Trump's 2020 presidential campaign.

== Donations ==
The Fairfield University Dolan School of Business at Fairfield University is named in recognition of Dolan's $25 million donation in 2000 and his service to the university as a member of the board of trustees.

The Dolan Center for Science and Technology is John Carroll University's showcase building. Completed in 2003 at a cost of over $66 million, it houses JCU's science departments, including Mathematics and Computer Science.

== Affiliations and honors ==
- Dolan was a trustee of Fairfield University and was also a member of the board of governors of St. Francis Hospital in Flower Hill, New York.
- In November 2016, Dolan received an honorary doctorate from Fairfield University, in recognition of "his remarkable contribution to [American] culture industry, for his exemplary vision and tenacity as a media pioneer, and for his important contribution to Fairfield University as a trustee and donor who has supported scholarship funds and the Charles F. Dolan School of Business."
