= Madison Square Garden Entertainment =

American holding company in New York City

Madison Square Garden Entertainment Corp.
- Type: Public
- Traded as: NYSE: MSGE (Class A)
- Industry: Entertainment; Real estate
- Founded: April 20, 2023; 3 years ago
- Founder: James L. Dolan
- Headquarters: New York City, New York, U.S.
- Key people: James L. Dolan (executive chairman & CEO); Josephine Vaccarello (president)
- Owners: Dolan family Sphere Entertainment (33%)
- Subsidiaries: Beacon Theatre; Chicago Theatre; Madison Square Garden; Radio City Music Hall
- Website: msgentertainment.com

Madison Square Garden Entertainment Corp. (also known as MSG Entertainment) is an American entertainment holding company based in New York City. It is controlled by the family of the late Charles Dolan.

The first incarnation of the company was established in April 2020 when The Madison Square Garden Company (now Madison Square Garden Sports) spun off its non-sports assets as an independent, publicly traded company. In April 2023, Madison Square Garden Entertainment was renamed Sphere Entertainment, and spun off its theatres and event businesses as a new company that inherited the Madison Square Garden Entertainment name. Sphere Entertainment holds a minority stake in the spin-off.

MSG Entertainment owns and operates its namesake Madison Square Garden in New York City, including the arena and The Theater at Madison Square Garden. In addition to the Garden itself, MSG Entertainment operates two other theaters in Manhattan: Radio City Music Hall and the Beacon Theatre. Outside New York City, MSG Entertainment owns and operates the Chicago Theatre (acquired in 2008). MSG Entertainment also produces the Radio City Christmas Spectacular (starring the Rockettes) at Radio City Music Hall and formerly in other venues around the United States.

== History ==
In November 2019, The Madison Square Garden Company announced that it would spin off its non-sports assets as Madison Square Garden Entertainment (MSGE). The spin-off was completed on April 20, 2020.

On March 26, 2021, MSGE announced that it would acquire the regional sports network group MSG Networks in an all-stock deal, reuniting it with its namesake venue; MSG Networks had originally been spun out from The Madison Square Garden Company in 2015. The acquisition was completed in July 2021.

On April 20, 2023, MSGE was renamed Sphere Entertainment, and spun off its traditional live events business (including its venues, aside from Sphere in Las Vegas) as avia a stock split. Sphere Entertainment would retain Sphere, MSG Networks, and a 33% stake in the new MSGE's stock. Ahead of the spin-off, MSGE's stake in Tao Group Hospitality was sold to Mark Scheinberg for $550 million; the stake was spun out with Sphere prior to the sale's closure.

== Surveillance and facial recognition ==
MSG has used facial recognition systems at its venues since 2018. In July 2022, MSG Entertainment instituted a policy that prohibits representatives of law firms that have been engaged in litigation with MSG or its subsidiaries from attending its venues in New York City. The company stated that this is for professional conduct reasons.

MSG Entertainment has faced criticism for using facial recognition to enforce this policy, which is being probed by the Attorney General of New York. In January 2023, members of the New York State Assembly and New York State Senate introduced identical bills designed to prevent MSG Entertainment from enforcing its policy at sporting events.

In late 2022, an attorney who works for a law firm in New Jersey involved in active litigation against MSG Entertainment was barred from attending the Radio City Christmas Spectacular with her nine-year-old daughter's Girl Scout troop and was forced to have her daughter enter the venue with the other children and mothers and attend the show without her. The attorney in question does not practice law in the state of New York and had not heard of the relevant case involving MSG Entertainment until she was prevented from attending the show; she was singled out solely because of her association with her law firm.

Explaining the policy, Executive Chairman James L. Dolan stated, "It's like something out of ‘The Godfather,’ it's like ‘It's only business.’ It's not only business, and if you sue us, we’re gonna tell you not to come." One lawyer barred from entering Madison Square Garden to watch a New York Rangers game, meanwhile, stated that Dolan, "lit a firestorm–for no apparent reason other than that he is a petty and vindictive person."

In 2026, it was reported that MSG Executive Vice President and Chief Security Officer John Eversole had begun a surveillance campaign of an attendee because she was a trans woman. She was later banned from the venue due to a stalking allegation. MSG security employees have alleged that the company has contacted Garden attendees' hometown police departments in response to social media posts "if those posts could be interpreted in any way as threats," and asked those departments to "take action."

A 2026 data breach by ShinyHunters revealed MSGE compiling lists of LGBTQ celebrities, and anti-facial recognition activists.
