= James Dolan (businessman) =

American businessman (born 1955)

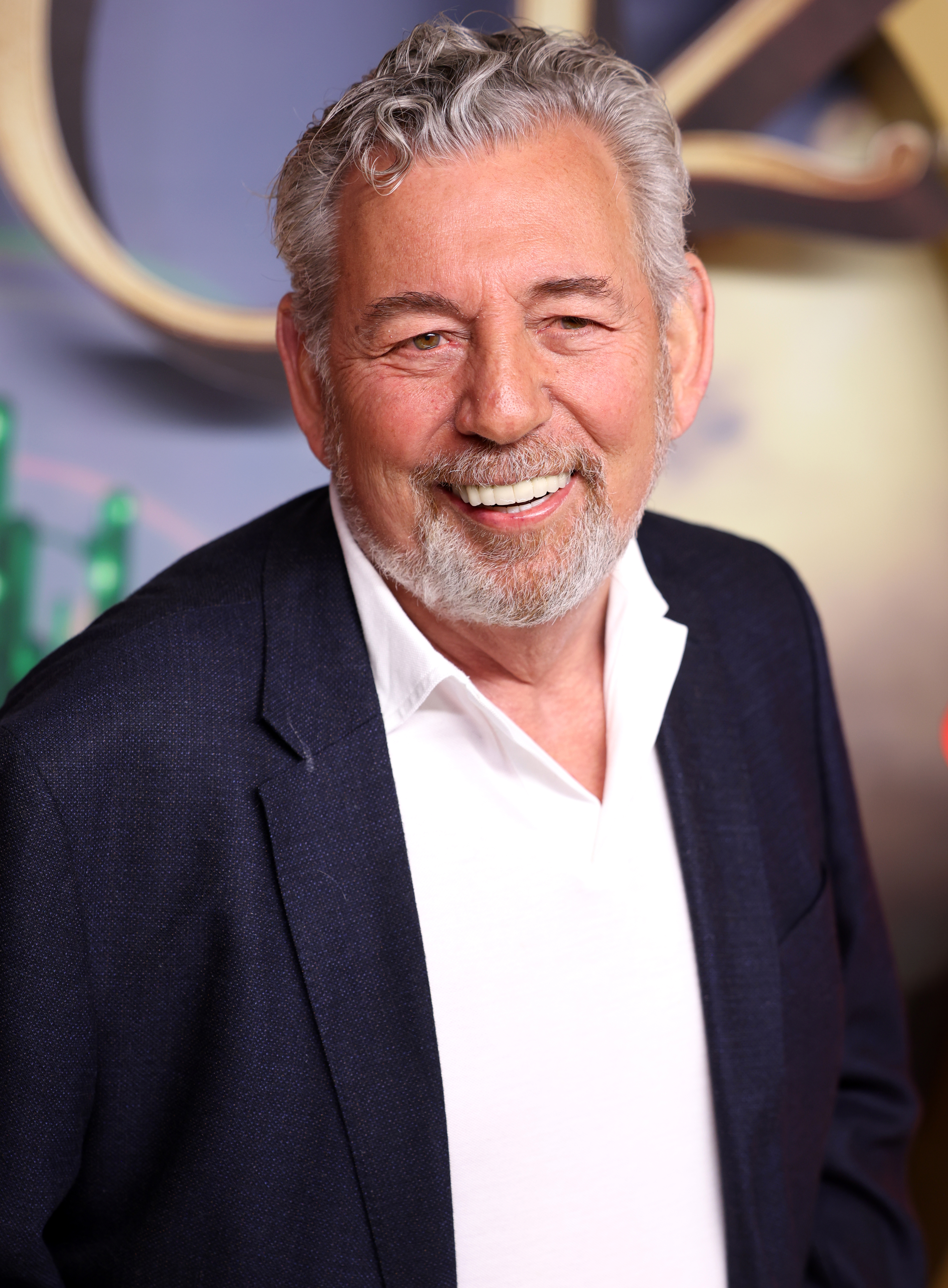
- Dolan in 2025
- Born: James Lawrence Dolan; May 11, 1955 (age 71); Massapequa, New York, U.S.
- Education: State University of New York, New Paltz (BA)
- Title: Executive Chairman and CEO, Madison Square Garden Sports, Sphere Entertainment, and Madison Square Garden Entertainment; Executive Chairman, MSG Networks
- Spouse: Kristin Dolan (m. 2002)
- Children: 6
- Father: Charles Dolan
- Relatives: Larry Dolan (uncle); Paul Dolan (cousin); Matt Dolan (cousin)
- Awards: NBA Champion (2026)

James Lawrence Dolan (born May 11, 1955) is an American businessman, and the executive chairman and chief executive officer of Madison Square Garden Sports and Madison Square Garden Entertainment, and executive chairman of Sphere Entertainment. Dolan was previously CEO of Cablevision, founded by his father, until its sale in June 2016 to European telecom conglomerate Altice.

Dolan oversees all day-to-day operations within his companies. This includes two professional sports teams, the New York Knicks and New York Rangers, as well as regional sports networks MSG Network and MSG SportsNet. Dolan has been executive chairman of the Knicks and the Rangers since 1999, overseeing a long title drought until the Knicks became 2026 NBA champions.

== Early life and education ==
Dolan is one of six children of Cablevision founder Charles Dolan and his wife, Helen Ann Dolan, and nephew of Cleveland Guardians owner Larry J. Dolan. He is of Irish descent. After originally pursuing a career in music, Dolan eventually switched to a major in communications at SUNY New Paltz and began working for Cablevision in various capacities including sales before eventually being dispatched to Cleveland by his father to manage the launching of a sports radio station. In 1995, he was made CEO of Cablevision. Throughout his early adult life, Dolan battled drug and alcohol problems and was reportedly known for having a volatile temper. In 1993, he went to drug rehabilitation at the Hazelden clinic in Center City, Minnesota.

== Business career ==
Dolan opposed his father's proposed Voom satellite service, which became a polarizing controversy among Cablevision's board of directors. While supporters argued Voom could propel Cablevision into the future emerging satellite market and a wider customer base, opponents of the plan, including James Dolan, argued it was too expensive with no expense relief for the foreseeable future. In the end, the younger Dolan prevailed and Voom was shut down. This was an instrumental event in Dolan emerging from his father's shadow, albeit reluctantly, as a viable businessman.

His business career has included multiple failures, which include purchasing the failing Wiz electronics and entertainment chain, which ended up posting losses of $250 million before being liquidated, and the Clearview Cinemas chain which failed to generate any significant revenue.

== Sports management ==
In 1994, Paramount Communications, the owner of Madison Square Garden, was acquired by Viacom, who in turn sold the MSG properties to Cablevision and ITT Corporation, which had 50% ownership each. ITT sold its share to Cablevision three years later.

In 1999, Dolan was given an increased role in managing Cablevision's sports properties and is now the primary manager of these assets. The teams under his domain include most notably the National Basketball Association's New York Knicks, the National Hockey League's New York Rangers, and the American Hockey League's Hartford Wolf Pack. Dolan also formerly owned the Women's National Basketball Association's New York Liberty, which he sold to Joseph Tsai and Clara Wu Tsai in 2019.

As Chairman of Madison Square Garden, he supervises day-to-day operations of its professional sports teams and regional sports networks, which include MSG Network and MSG Plus. He is a governor of the Knicks and Rangers to their respective leagues.

After winning the Stanley Cup in 1994, the Rangers saw a decline in performance in the wake of Dolan's increased role in managing the team and failed to make the playoffs from the 1997–98 season until the 2004–05 NHL lockout, despite leading the league in payroll in most of those years. This was the longest playoff drought in the franchise's history, in part due to questionable, expensive free-agent signings, such as Eric Lindros, Pavel Bure, and Theo Fleury. However, since the resolution of the NHL lockout in 2005, Dolan allowed general manager Glen Sather to rebuild the team from the ground up. That rebuild led to a revival of the club and the organization. The improvement was obvious when the team made it to the Eastern Conference finals in 2012, for the first since 1997. The team finally made it back to the Stanley Cup Final in 2014, 20 years after they last won the cup.

Like the Rangers, the Knicks performed abysmally in the early 2000s. Unlike the Rangers, they have yet to fully recover, which fans mostly blame on Dolan's management missteps. Although the Knicks made the NBA Finals in 1999, they did not post another winning season until the 2012–13 season. Furthermore, the Knicks did not make the playoffs at any point between the 2003–04 and 2010–11 seasons, which both ended in the first round with four-game sweeps of the Knicks. In 2007, NBA Commissioner David Stern criticized Dolan's management of the Knicks, saying "they're not a model of intelligent management."

In 2007, Dolan was named as a defendant in a sexual harassment lawsuit submitted by a former Knicks executive, Anucha Browne-Sanders. Browne-Sanders accused Dolan of firing her out of spite after she complained about sexual harassment from Isiah Thomas. The court ruled in favor of Brown-Sanders and Dolan had to pay $3 million of the $11 million settlement. MSG was responsible for paying the remainder of the settlement.

On May 5, 2015, Dolan announced that Isiah Thomas would be president of the WNBA's Liberty. Considering Thomas' history being both a failed President/GM of the Knicks and Thomas being implicated in the Anucha Browne-Sanders sexual harassment incident, Dolan's judgment was questioned by many fans and members of the press. After Dolan sold the Liberty to Joseph Tsai and Clara Wu Tsai, the new owners promptly relieved Thomas of his duties with the Liberty on February 21, 2019.

In 2022, it was reported that Dolan had instituted a policy of using facial recognition at his venues to prevent admission to attorneys whose law firms were engaged in legal disputes with Dolan and his businesses, even when those attorneys had legitimate tickets to the show or event. This led to lawsuits and an investigation into whether Dolan's venues should be stripped of their state-issued liquor licenses.

When the New York Knicks made the NBA Finals in the 2026 championship season, Dolan sat next to President Donald Trump in Madison Square Garden at game three. Prior to game four, Dolan feuded with New York mayor Zohran Mamdani. Mamdani blamed Dolan for cancelling a watch party outside of Madison Square Garden for game four of the NBA finals. Dolan attributed the cancellation to enhanced security measures that the city implemented around the stadium after a watch party after game three had turned violent.

== Media policies ==
Dolan rarely speaks with members of the media and communicates to the press through released statements or in interviews with MSG Network. In 2000, Dolan instituted media training for all Garden employees who might deal with the press and instituted a rule against team personnel criticizing others in the organization via the media. Under Dolan's watch, MSG implemented controversial media policies limiting access to players. Some of these measures included prohibiting reporters and Knicks' beat writers from interviewing players without an MSG public relations official present, forbidding one-on-one interviews, and banning writers who write articles critical of the organization. The policies also forbid the MSG Network from being critical of the Knicks and the Rangers, regardless of their performance. Such measures were not standard practice for other NBA teams.

== Personal life ==
As of 2023, Dolan lived on Long Island with his wife Kristin, whom he married at Mar-a-Lago in 2002. They separated in 2018 and she was named chief executive officer of AMC Networks in 2023. Dolan has been married twice and has six sons. His son Charlie is the bassist of the band Tauk. His son Quentin is on the board of directors for MSG Entertainment and works for several of the family's other business ventures.

Dolan played a role in organizing the 12-12-12: The Concert for Sandy Relief benefit, which raised an initial $50 million for the victims of Hurricane Sandy.

=== Political activities ===
In 2016, he contributed $300,000 to the Trump Victory Committee in support of the Donald Trump 2016 presidential campaign. Trump and Dolan describe each other as friends. Dolan is a member at his Mar-a-Lago club and held his wedding there in 2002. He donated $50,000 to Nicole Malliotakis in 2020 after incumbent Max Rose criticized Dolan's management of the Knicks. In the 2021 New York City Democratic mayoral primary, he donated $5,000 to Ray McGuire and $2,000 to Eric Adams.

=== Hobbies ===
Dolan performs as the singer for JD & the Straight Shot, a country blues and roots rock vanity project he formed in 2001. Notable members of the band include Marc Copely, Shawn Pelton, and Carolyn Dawn Johnson; the band's seventh studio album The Great Divide was released in March 2019.

Because of his corporate status and his friendship and business relationship with entertainment executive Irving Azoff, Dolan has been able to leverage JD & the Straight Shot onto shows by the Eagles, the Allman Brothers Band, ZZ Top, Jewel, Keith Urban, the Chicks, Joe Walsh and Robert Randolph. Attendance by Madison Square Garden staff employees "is expected and noted" when the group plays at New York clubs.

The New York Times music critic Jon Pareles described the band as a group of "well-known sidemen backing a karaoke grade singer", and said Dolan's "musical talents are unlikely to endanger his day job". After the group's performance opening for ZZ Top, one reviewer wrote that Dolan's "enthusiasm for playing mediocre American rock did little to make their forgettable performance entertaining". After a 2017 show in New York City, another reviewer observed that Dolan "sings like he's trying not to cough, and it's possible he can't play the guitar. Worse, his songs belie his status as a cosplaying bluesman; most of his lyrics simply summarize current events or books that he's read as if he were presenting a 10th grade English class project."

=== Sexual assault lawsuit ===
On January 16, 2024, a sexual assault lawsuit was filed against Dolan in the U.S. District Court for the Central District of California by Kellye Croft. Croft stated that she was employed by the Eagles as a massage therapist during the band's History of the Eagles – Live in Concert tour, for which JD & the Straight Shot opened shows, in 2013; Dolan was believed to have provided a large sum of money for the tour as well. Croft alleged Dolan pressured her into giving him "unwanted sexual intercourse" during the tour. In her lawsuit, Croft also alleged Dolan set her up to be molested by Harvey Weinstein in January 2014. On September 17, 2024, the suit was dismissed by a U.S. district judge. The district judge ruled that Croft's complaint had failed to properly allege federal crimes of fraud, coercion, or a "commercial sex act;" but "declined to exercise supplemental jurisdiction over the state claims against Weinstein and Dolan."
