= 1990 Ohio Secretary of State election =

- November 6, 1990
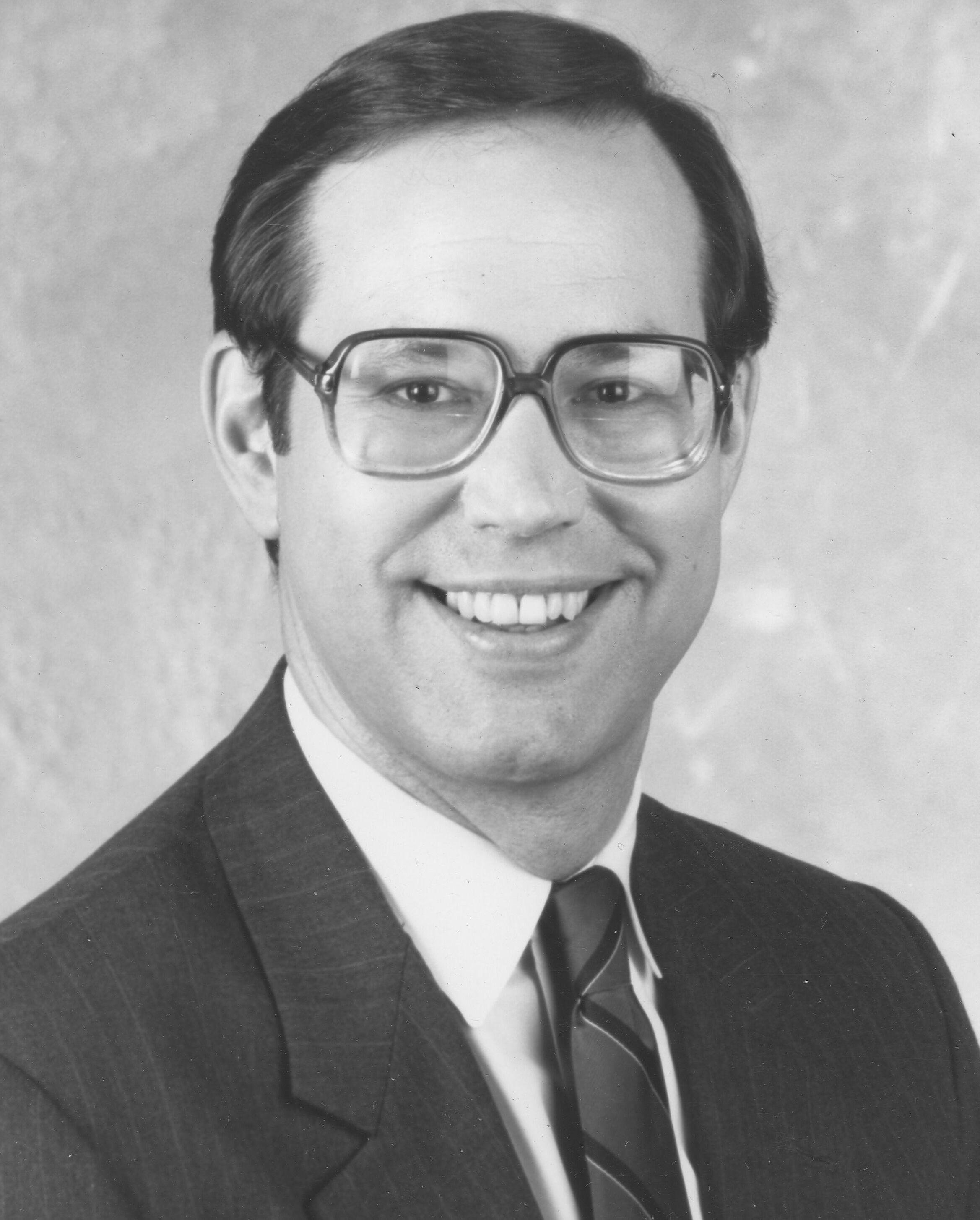

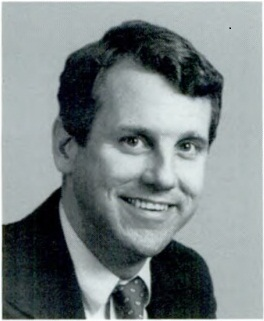
Nominee	Bob Taft	Sherrod Brown
Party	Republican	Democratic
Popular vote	1,809,416	1,604,058
Percentage	53.01%	46.99%
- Taft: 50–60% 60–70% Brown: 50–60% 60–70%
Secretary of State before election
Sherrod Brown
Democratic
Elected Secretary of State
Bob Taft
Republican

The 1990 Ohio Secretary of State election was held on November 6, 1990, to elect the Ohio Secretary of State. Primaries were held on May 8, 1990. Republican former Ohio House Representative Bob Taft narrowly defeated Democratic incumbent Ohio Secretary of State Sherrod Brown.

== Democratic primary ==
=== Candidates ===
- Sherrod Brown, incumbent Ohio Secretary of State (1983–1991)

=== Campaign ===
Brown won renomination unopposed.

=== Results ===
Democratic primary results
Party	Candidate	Votes	%
Democratic	Sherrod Brown	685,597	100%
Total votes		685,597	100.00%

== Republican primary ==
=== Candidates ===
- Bob Taft, former Ohio House Representative (1977–1981)

=== Campaign ===
Taft won the Republican nomination without opposition.

=== Results ===
Republican primary results
Party	Candidate	Votes	%
Republican	Bob Taft	580,446	100%
Total votes		580,446	100.00%

== General election ==
=== Candidates ===
- Bob Taft, former Ohio House Representative (1977–1981) (Republican)
- Sherrod Brown, incumbent Ohio Secretary of State (1983–1991) (Democratic)

=== Results ===
1990 Ohio Secretary of State election results
Party	Candidate	Votes	%	±%
Republican	Bob Taft	1,809,416	53.01%	+12.73%
Democratic	Sherrod Brown (Incumbent)	1,604,058	46.99%	−12.73%
Total votes		3,413,474	100.00%	
Republican gain from Democratic		Swing		
