= Madison Square Garden Sports =

American sports holding company

Madison Square Garden Sports Corp.
- Type: Public
- Traded as: NYSE: MSGS (Class A); Russell 1000 Component; S&P 600 component
- Industry: Sports; Entertainment
- Founded: 2010; 16 years ago; 2015; 11 years ago; (spin-off Madison Square Network)
- Founder: James L. Dolan
- Headquarters: New York City, U.S.
- Key people: James L. Dolan (executive chairman); Andrew Lustgarten (president and CEO)
- Revenue: ▲US$1.6 billion (2018)
- Operating income: ▲$316.79 million (2016)
- Total assets: ▲$9.384 billion (2008)
- Owner: James L. Dolan (71.1% voting, 21.6% economic); Silver Lake Partners (≈10%)
- Subsidiaries: New York Rangers; New York Knicks; Hartford Wolf Pack; Westchester Knicks
- Website: msgsports.com

Madison Square Garden Sports Corp. (also known as MSG Sports) is an American sports holding company based in New York City.

MSG Sports manages professional sports teams. These include the National Basketball Association's New York Knicks and their NBA G League affiliate, the Westchester Knicks, and the National Hockey League's New York Rangers and their American Hockey League affiliate, the Hartford Wolf Pack.

The original company was established in 2010 when Cablevision spun off the New York Knicks, New York Rangers, Madison Square Garden, MSG Network and other entertainment assets as an independent, publicly traded company.

In 2015, the original company spun off the sports and entertainment division into a separate company and the original company was renamed to MSG Networks, Inc.; the new company took the name "the Madison Square Garden Company".

In 2020, the Madison Square Garden Company rebranded as Madison Square Garden Sports Corp. and subsequently spun off its entertainment division as Madison Square Garden Entertainment.

== History ==
=== Pre-history ===
On May 31, 1923, Tex Rickard incorporated the New Madison Square Garden Corporation for the purpose of building and operating the third Madison Square Garden. On January 15, 1925, shortly after the Garden opened, the corporation's name was changed to the Madison Square Garden Corporation.

Following the success of the National Hockey League's New York Americans, the Madison Square Garden Corporation established the New York Rangers, which began play in 1926. In 1946, at the behest of Ned Irish, the Madison Square Garden Corporation became a charter member of the National Basketball Association with the New York Knicks.

By the mid-1950s, James D. Norris and Arthur Wirtz, who already owned the Detroit Olympia and Chicago Stadium as well as interests in numerous National Hockey League teams, owned some 60% of the stock in the Madison Square Garden Corporation. Both men served on the corporation's board, as did Irish (who was executive vice president) and John Reed Kilpatrick (who became chairman of the board), among others. In 1957, however, U.S. Federal Judge Sylvester J. Ryan ruled that the International Boxing Club of New York (IBC), run by Norris and Wirtz, was monopolizing the promotion of boxing matches in violation of U.S. antitrust law. Ryan ordered the two men to divest their stock in the Madison Square Garden Corporation within five years and resign as officers and directors of the company. Though Norris and Wirtz appealed, the Supreme Court of the United States upheld Ryan's decision two years later.

On January 30, 1959, Norris and Wirtz accordingly sold their controlling interest in the Madison Square Garden Corporation, accounting for 40% of the stock, to automaker-turned-investment firm Graham-Paige for $4 million. On April 7, 1960, the Madison Square Garden Corporation merged with Graham-Paige, and on March 9, 1962, Graham-Paige changed its name to the Madison Square Garden Corporation to reflect its largest asset.

Gulf and Western Industries, which began purchasing Madison Square Garden stock in 1969 and by 1977 owned 81%, purchased complete control of the corporation and turned it into a wholly owned subsidiary on August 19, 1977. At the time of Gulf and Western's acquisition, the Madison Square Garden Corporation owned the arena, Knicks, Rangers, three horse tracks (Roosevelt Raceway, Arlington Park, and Washington Park Race Track), Holiday on Ice, and real estate holdings in Long Island, Manhattan, and Chicago. In June 1989, Gulf and Western changed its name to Paramount Communications, reflecting its ownership of Paramount Pictures and its focus on its entertainment and publishing properties.

In 1994, Viacom purchased majority ownership of Paramount Communications, but quickly sold MSG to Cablevision and ITT Corporation. In 1997, ITT sold its half to Cablevision for $650 million.

=== Main history ===
In February 2010, Cablevision spun off the MSG properties, including the sports franchises, into the Madison Square Garden Company.

On September 30, 2015, MSG spun off its regional sports networks; the split was structured so that the original Madison Square Garden Company was renamed to MSG Networks, Inc., and spun off its sports and entertainment properties as a new Madison Square Garden Company.

In September 2018, Madison Square Garden began work on a spherical music venue in Las Vegas, called MSG Sphere Las Vegas, planned to open in 2021. Earlier in the year, MSG announced plans to build MSG Sphere London, near the Queen Elizabeth Olympic Park in Stratford. Both venues are designed by Populous architects and are supposed to incorporate highly advanced audio and visual technologies. The company's Las Vegas venue opened on September 29, 2023. In January 2024, plans for the venue in London were shelved.

In November 2019, MSG announced its intent to perform a tax-free spin off its non-sports assets as a new publicly traded company. Both companies would remain controlled by the Dolan family. The spin-off was completed in April 2020, with the entertainment assets spun off as Madison Square Garden Entertainment, and the existing company renamed Madison Square Garden Sports.

In February 2026, it was reported that Madison Square Garden Sports was considering spinning out the Knicks and Rangers as separate companies following calls from an activist shareholder.

== Acquisitions ==
On August 17, 2016, MSG acquired a 12% stake in digital media, broadcasting, and events company Townsquare Media from GE Capital.

In January 2017 MSG paid $181 million for a majority stake in nightlife group Tao Group.

== Former holdings ==
The company formerly owned the New York Liberty of the WNBA, until the team was sold in 2018. The company also formerly operated the Hartford Civic Center in Hartford, Connecticut, and Rentschler Field in East Hartford under contract with the state of Connecticut until the 2007 season when it was replaced by Northland/Anschutz Entertainment Group.

On July 31, 2017, MSG acquired a controlling stake in professional video gaming team Counter Logic Gaming. On April 6, 2023, it was announced that NRG Esports had purchased the rights to CLG's League of Legends spot in the League Championship Series (LCS), and that other divisions and members of CLG had been released. As a result, MSG was given a major stake in NRG.

== Anti-competitive controversies ==
On several occasions, the Madison Square Garden Company has generated controversy in regard to how it approaches its competition. On two occasions they made attempts to block the construction of competing venues in the New York and Los Angeles markets.

=== West Side Stadium ===
Before the Madison Square Garden Company was formed, its businesses were part of Cablevision. In 2005, it was proposed that a new West Side Stadium be built for the New York Jets. The stadium would have directly competed with the then-Cablevision owned Madison Square Garden. Cablevision ran TV ads rallying against the proposed stadium which ultimately resulted in the state of New York rejecting the proposal. The rejection of the proposal meant that Madison Square Garden would not have a nearby venue competing for concert revenue. The rejection of the venue also had a negative impact on New York's bid for the 2012 Summer Olympics, which was ultimately defeated by London.

=== Los Angeles Clippers arena proposal ===
In 2018, the Madison Square Garden Company was behind a lawsuit against the city of Inglewood in an attempt to stop the construction of a new basketball arena for the Los Angeles Clippers. The new arena would compete directly with The Forum which was owned by the Madison Square Garden Company. Another lawsuit from a local community group was filed to block the construction of the venue in June 2018. Inglewood mayor James T. Butts Jr. suggested that the lawsuit was brought about by "business interests from out-of-state", suggesting that the Madison Square Garden Company were using this group to not have a competing arena nearby. James Dolan was said to be trying to avoid being deposed in the case. In December 2018, the Los Angeles Clippers countersued the Madison Square Garden Company alleging that they are trying to prevent competition from a new arena by trying to stop its construction.

In March 2019, leaked emails revealed that Irving Azoff attempted to lure the Los Angeles Lakers back to The Forum after their lease at the Staples Center was up. Despite nothing coming of the proposal, Azoff's proposal to re-purpose The Forum was seen as a way of preventing the Los Angeles Clippers from building their own arena in Inglewood and ensuring that the Madison Square Garden Company got an unfair advantage over rival AEG, which already owns part of the Lakers. In the summer of 2019 it was reported that the company had spent large amounts of money trying to influence Inglewood's mayoral election in the hopes of preventing the construction of the competing arena. In addition, the company also financially supported community groups and lawsuits seeking to prevent the construction of the new arena. The lawsuit became moot in March 2020, when Clippers owner Steve Ballmer announced that he would purchase The Forum for $400 million. The Forum will be repurposed as a dedicated concert venue.

== Officers ==
- James L. Dolan – Executive Chairman
- Andrew Lustgarten – President and CEO
- Victoria Mink – Chief Financial Officer
- Leon Rose – President, Basketball Operations – New York Knicks
- Chris Drury – President, Hockey Operations – New York Rangers
