= 25 Water Street =

Building in Manhattan, New York

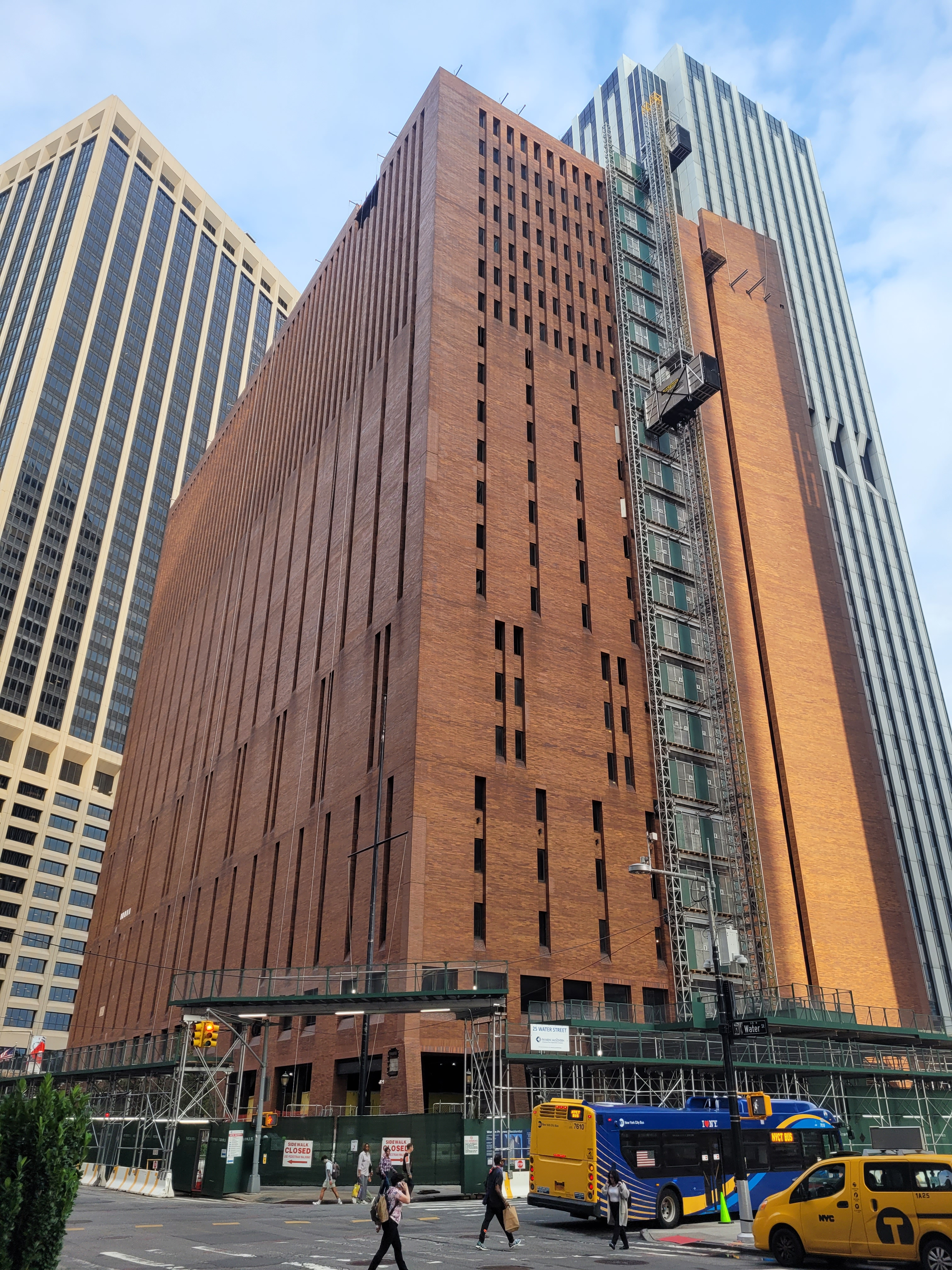
- 25 Water Street in 2023, with 55 Water Street (left) and 125 Broad Street (right) in the background
- Former names: 4 New York Plaza

General information
- Status: Closed for redevelopment
- Type: Office (1969–2022); Residential (planned)
- Architectural style: Brutalism
- Location: New York City, New York, United States
- Coordinates: 40°42′10″N 74°00′40″W
- Construction started: 1967
- Completed: 1969
- Owner: GFP Real Estate and Metroloft

Technical details
- Floor count: 22 (1969–2022); 32 (planned)
- Floor area: 1.1 million square feet (as of 2011)

Design and construction
- Architect: Carson, Lundin & Shaw

25 Water Street, also known as 4 New York Plaza, is a building at Water Street and Broad Street the Financial District of Manhattan in New York City, U.S. It directly adjoins both 125 Broad Street to the south, which is connected, and the Vietnam Veterans Plaza to the east. The building was completed in 1969 and operated as an office building from 1969 to 2022. In 2023 it began a process of redevelopment into a residential building that will have over 1,300 apartments, the largest such office-to-residential property conversion in the United States.

== History ==
=== Office use ===
Originally known as 4 New York Plaza, the building began construction in 1967 and was completed in 1969. It was built in a Brutalist style and was designed by the architecture firm Carson, Lundin & Shaw. Construction proceeded remarkably quickly, with the first tenants moving in only 26 months from the beginning of design. The building included among its first tenants the Manufacturers Hanover Trust Company and Oppenheimer & Co. The building was designed as an operations center that would process the banking and financial activities of Manufacturers Hanover, such as collecting and recording checks. To make the air-conditioning of 1960s mainframe computers more efficient, the building had relatively few, and narrow, windows from the 3rd to 15th floors. More windows were included on the 2nd floor, intended for Manufacturers Hanover staff, and the top seven floors, intended to be leased out. The reddish-brown brick exterior was chosen to match the style of historic buildings from the Dutch era of New Amsterdam, such as the Stadt Huys Site. The building won an architectural award in the era. However, the building's narrow windows were generally criticized after the building no longer hosted a data center. Many of the historic brick buildings the exterior was designed to blend in with were demolished in the decade following construction.

After Manufacturers Hanover merged with Chemical Bank in 1992, facilities of the combined bank were housed in 4 New York Plaza. JPMorgan Chase owned the building by the 1990s, after it acquired Chemical Bank. By 2009, JPMorgan Chase had placed 4 New York Plaza and several other buildings for sale due to the 2008 financial crisis. The bank sold the property to Capstone Equities and Harbor Group International in December 2009 for US$108.9 million. The buyers agreed to lease back space in the building they were already using, becoming a major tenant of the building instead. The New York Daily News newspaper leased space at 4 New York Plaza in 2010 and moved there in June 2011. Harbor Group International sold the building in 2012 to HSBC Alternative Investments and Edge Fund Advisors for $270 million.

Flooding caused by Superstorm Sandy was very damaging to Lower Manhattan in 2012, with water damage to mechanical and electrical systems that often resided in basements. Like other buildings on Water Street, 4 New York Plaza was significantly affected by the flooding; the biggest tenants, JPMorgan and the New York Daily News, did not return to the building until late 2013. Due to financial troubles resulting from the decline of newspapers and the coronavirus pandemic, the Daily News closed their newsroom, which was in the building, in 2020. JPMorgan also sought to cut back usage in 2021, attempting to sublet space no longer needed due to the rise of hybrid work.

=== Residential conversion ===
In general, office rents in New York collapsed after the coronavirus pandemic, with an office space vacancy rate of 17–18% pushing down rents. Jeffrey Gural and Metro Loft Management were looking to buy the building by mid-2022. In December 2022, Edge Funds and HSBC Alternative Investments sold the property. The new owners—GFP Real Estate and Metroloft, with the cooperation of Rockwood Capital—wished to convert the building to residential use.

The new owners renamed the property from "4 New York Plaza" to "25 Water Street", and intended to redevelop the building. Changes in local regulations helped; the mayoral administration of Eric Adams encouraged projects to build more housing, and rolled out zoning changes and tax breaks designed to ease such conversions. The new owners secured a loan of $536 million to support the redevelopment, with the company CetraRuddy responsible for the architecture. Plans were made to add 10 more floors to the existing 22, and to replace the red-brown brick exterior of the structure, or repaint it a light beige. The plan included about 1,300 apartments for the redeveloped building, which would make it the largest office-to-residential conversion in the country. Preparatory work began in mid-2023. Some of the studios have home offices rather than bedrooms, due to zoning rules that prevent these offices from being classified as bedrooms. The converted building also has 100,000 square feet (9,300 m^{2}) of amenity spaces, including an atrium, spa, sauna, fitness center, game lounge, and indoor and outdoor pools.

25 Water Street was the first project in New York City to use the state's 467-m tax exemption, which grants tax deductions to existing non-residential structures that are being converted to residential use. Leasing for the apartments began in January 2025, and the first residents moved in the next month. A housing lottery for the affordable units opened that March. At the time, it was branded as SoMa, a reference to its location in southern Manhattan.

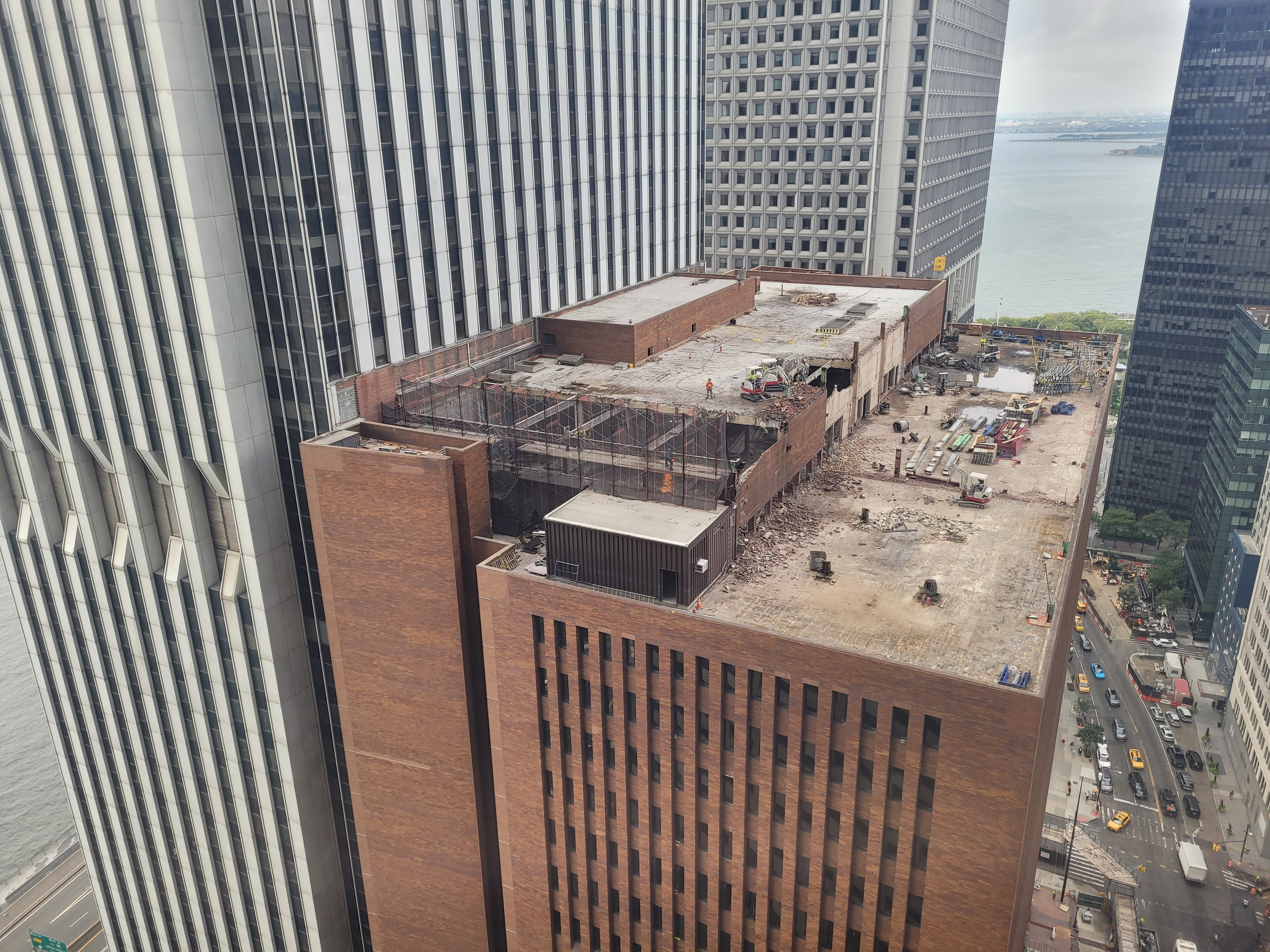
View of the top floor during redevelopment in 2023

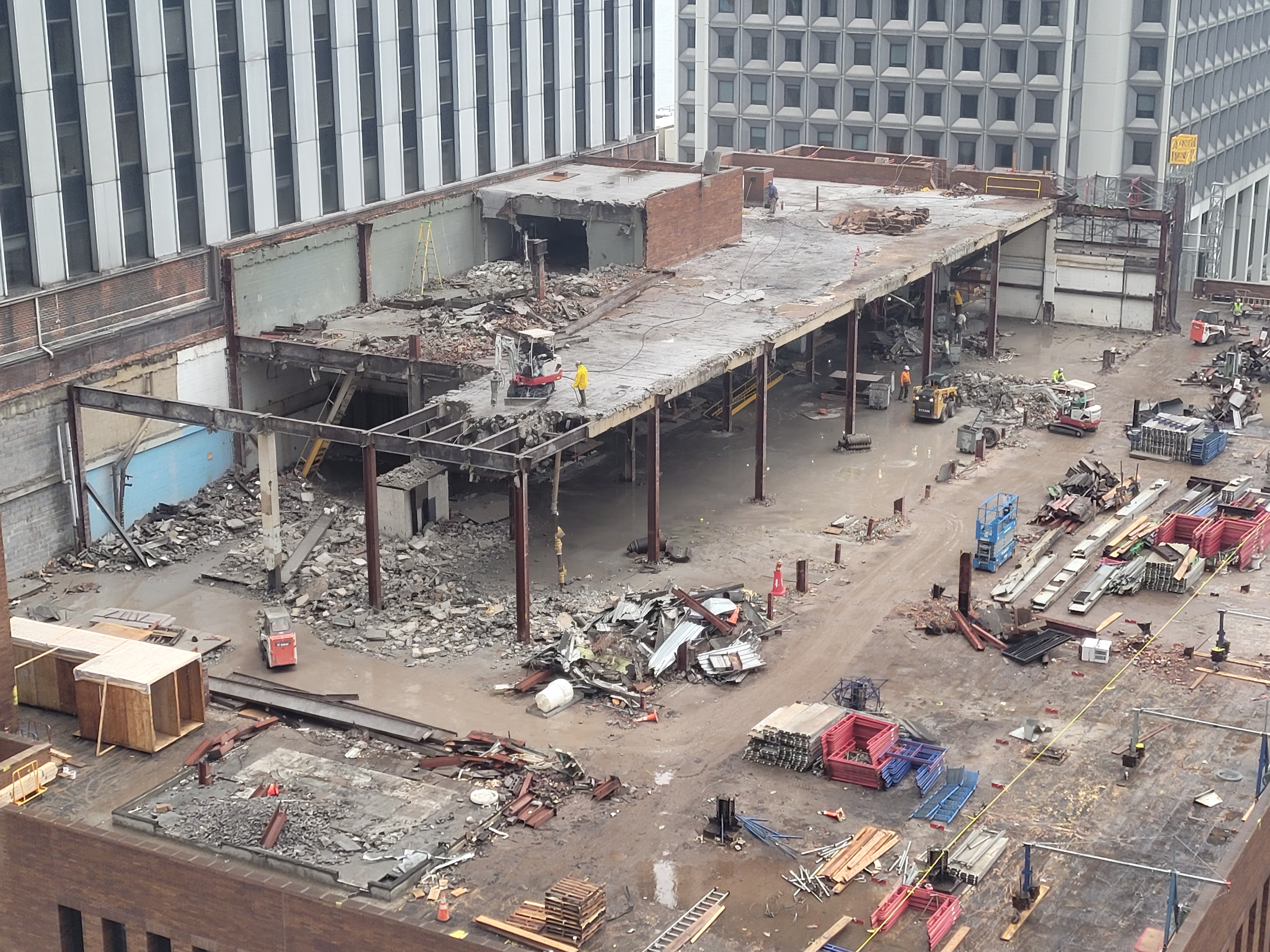
View of the top floor as workers demolish parts of the old structure

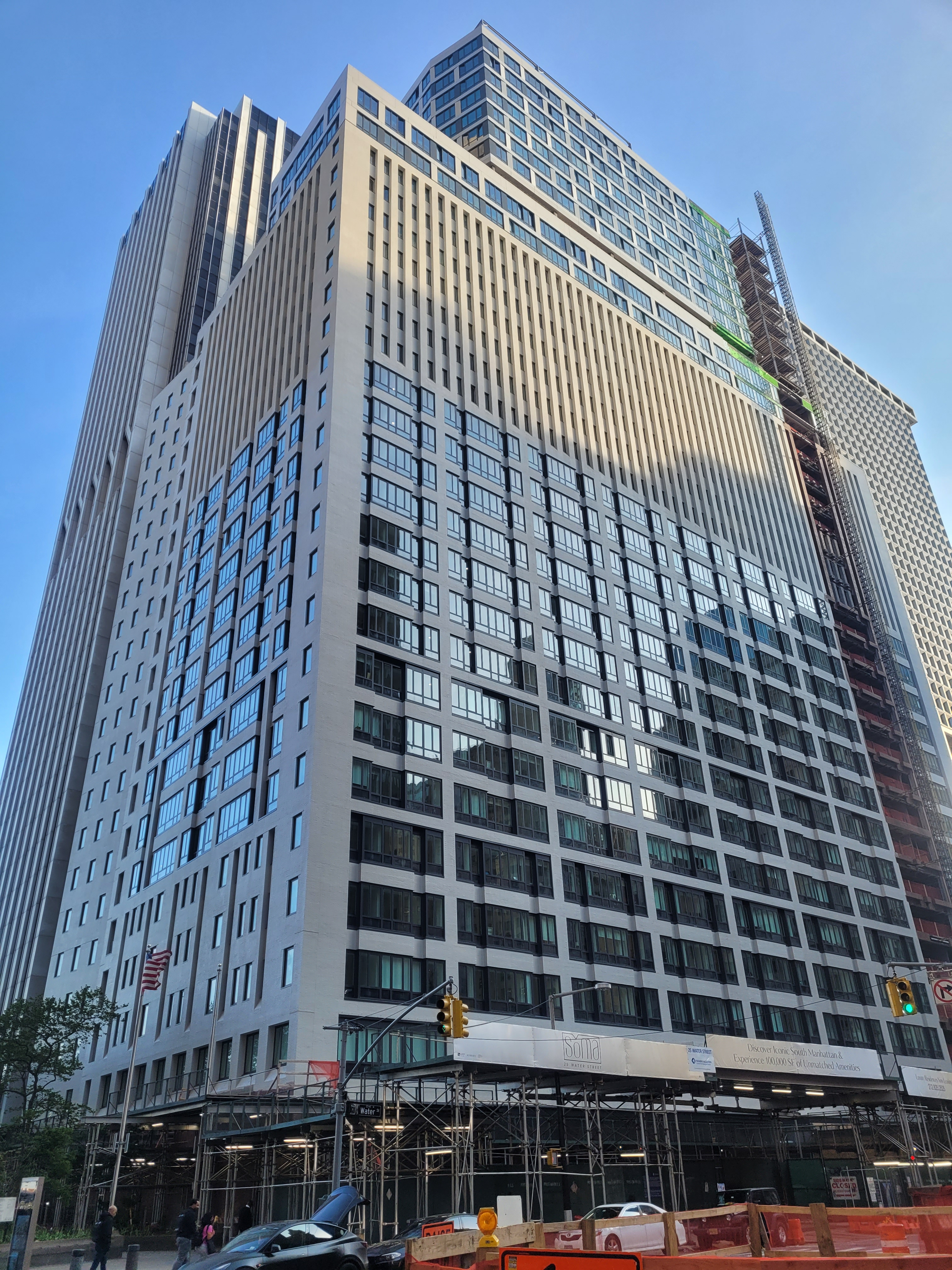
View from Water Street in May 2025, with much of the redevelopment finished
