= Chaim Schochet =

American real estate executive

- Born: 1986 or 1987 (age 38–39)
- Education: B.A. Rabbinical College of America
- Occupation: Real estate executive
- Known for: Executive of Optima Ventures
- Spouse: Rachel Schochet
- Children: 3

Chaim Schochet (born 1986/87) is an American real estate executive, developer, and manager at Optima Ventures, once the largest holder of real estate in Downtown Cleveland.

== Early life ==
Schochet was born to a Jewish family in Miami Beach, Florida, He attended the Rabbinical College of America in Miami, New York City, and Toronto where he graduated with a degree in Judaic studies in 2006.

== Optima ==
After spending a year in Singapore traveling and volunteering, he returned to Florida and accepted a job at Optima Ventures, a real estate investment firm 1/3 owned by Optima International of Miami (co-founded by Schochet's brother-in-law Mordechai "Motti" Korf and Uri Laber), and 2/3 owned by the principals of the Privat Group, one of Ukraine's largest business and banking groups founded by oligarchs Hennadiy Boholyubov and Ihor Kolomoyskyi. Korf and Laber owned 7% of the shares in PrivatBank Latvia, a majority-owned subsidiary of PrivatBank headquartered in Ukraine.

As investment executive of Optima Ventures, Schochet presided over the acquisition of a number of properties in Cleveland, Ohio including One Cleveland Center (purchased for $86.3 million in 2008); 55 Public Square (purchased for $34 million in 2008); the Huntington Bank Building (purchased for $18.5 million in 2010); and the Penton Media Building (purchased for $46.5 million in 2010). In September 2011, Optima purchased PNC Plaza in Louisville, Kentucky for $77 million. In October 2011, Optima entered its first joint venture, buying the 472-room Crowne Plaza Cleveland City Centre hotel with Sage Hospitality Resources, a hotel developer and manager based in Colorado. In September 2014, Schochet proposed a $231 million renovation of the Huntington Bank Building, the second largest office building in the city, into a mixed-used facility combining offices, apartments, condominiums and a boutique hotel; the renovation did not come to fruition and Optima sold the building to Hudson Holdings LLC for $22 million in 2015. He has also made acquisitions outside of Cleveland including the 2008 purchase of the 1.5 million square foot former Motorola manufacturing facility in Harvard, Illinois.

As of 2012, Optima Ventures owned more than 5 million square feet of real estate in the United States and was the largest holder of real estate in Downtown Cleveland surpassing Forest City Enterprises. Schochet describes himself as: "a long-term investor interested in any property that produces a healthy income."

== Lawsuit ==
In March 2016, PrivatBank Ukraine reduced its stake in PrivatBank Latvia to 46.5 percent removing it from the jurisdiction of Ukrainian regulators. In December 2016, PrivatBank was nationalized by the Ukrainian government which required a $5.5 billion bailout in order to save it from collapse. In 2018, PrivatBank was sold to private investors and in May 2019, the new owners filed a civil lawsuit in Delaware accusing Schochet, Korf, Laber, Boholyubov, and Kolomoyskyi with laundering up to $470 million in monies heavily relying on PrivatBank Latvia as a conduit. Schochet was identified as being the "front man" in an illegal scheme with Optima, which was accused in the lawsuit of "financial crimes and money laundering" involving "hundreds of millions of dollars worth of U.S. assets — including major real estate holdings in downtown Cleveland." In 2020, the FBI raided offices of Optima in Cleveland and Miami, in an ongoing investigation. The attorney for Schochet, Korf, and Laber, Marc Kasowitz, stated that the lawsuit is "100% false and defamatory... and is "nothing more than a fictional orchestrated political attack" on his clients who vocally opposed President Trump at the time. Trump adviser Rudy Giuliani commented that it should have been obvious that money laundering was occurring as Optima was overpaying for real estate and then selling at a loss.

== Personal life ==
Schochet is a practitioner of Chabad Judaism. He is married to Rachel Schechter; they have three children and live in Miami Beach.
