= Carson and Lundin =

American architectural firm

Carson & Lundin Carson, Lundin & Shaw Carson, Lundin & Thorson

Practice information
- Partners: Robert Carson FAIA; Earl H. Lundin AIA; Arvin B. Shaw III AIA; Robert L. Thorson AIA
- Founders: Robert Carson FAIA; Earl H. Lundin AIA
- Founded: 1941
- Dissolved: 1996
- Location: New York City

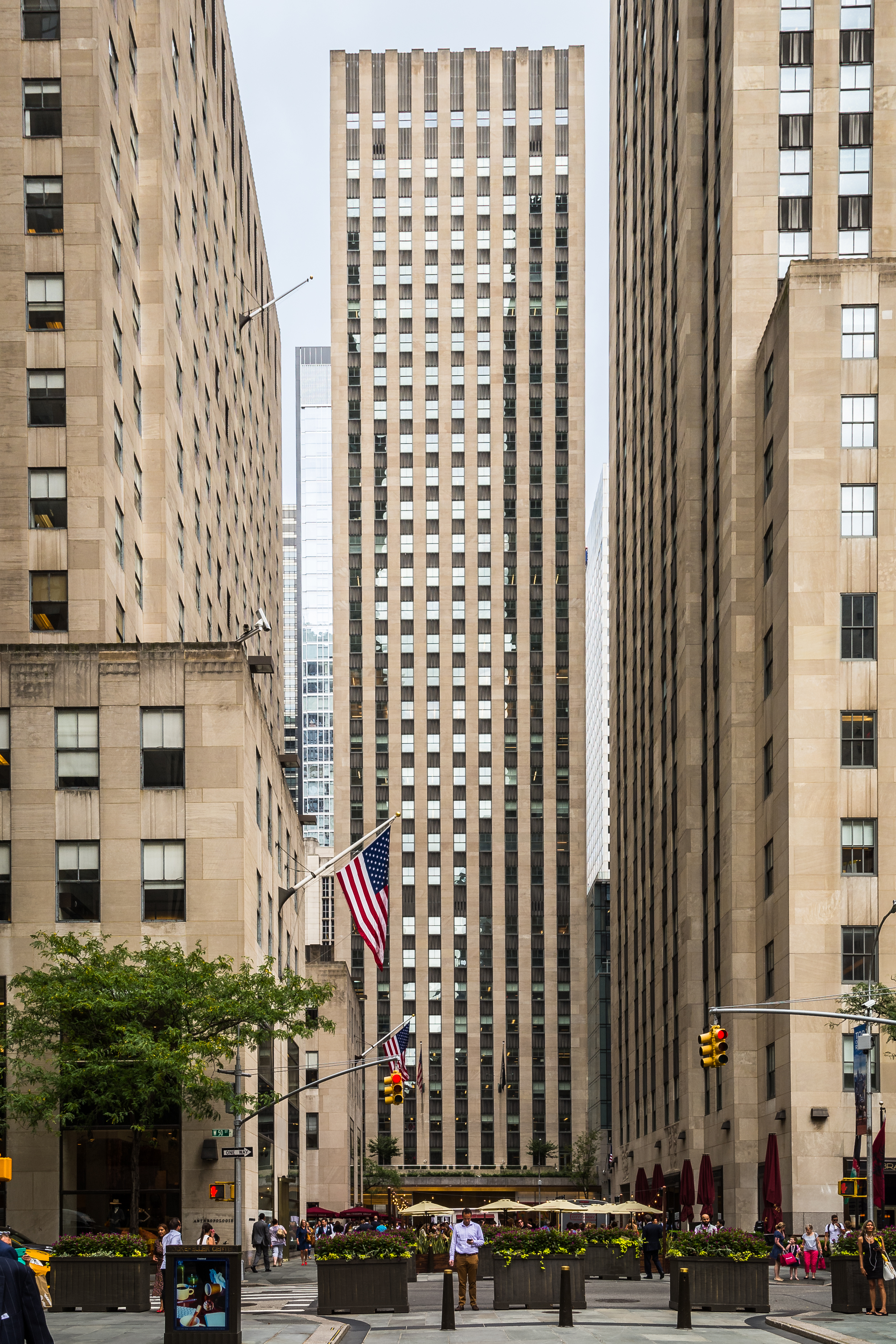
75 Rockefeller Plaza in New York City, designed by Carson & Lundin and completed in 1947.

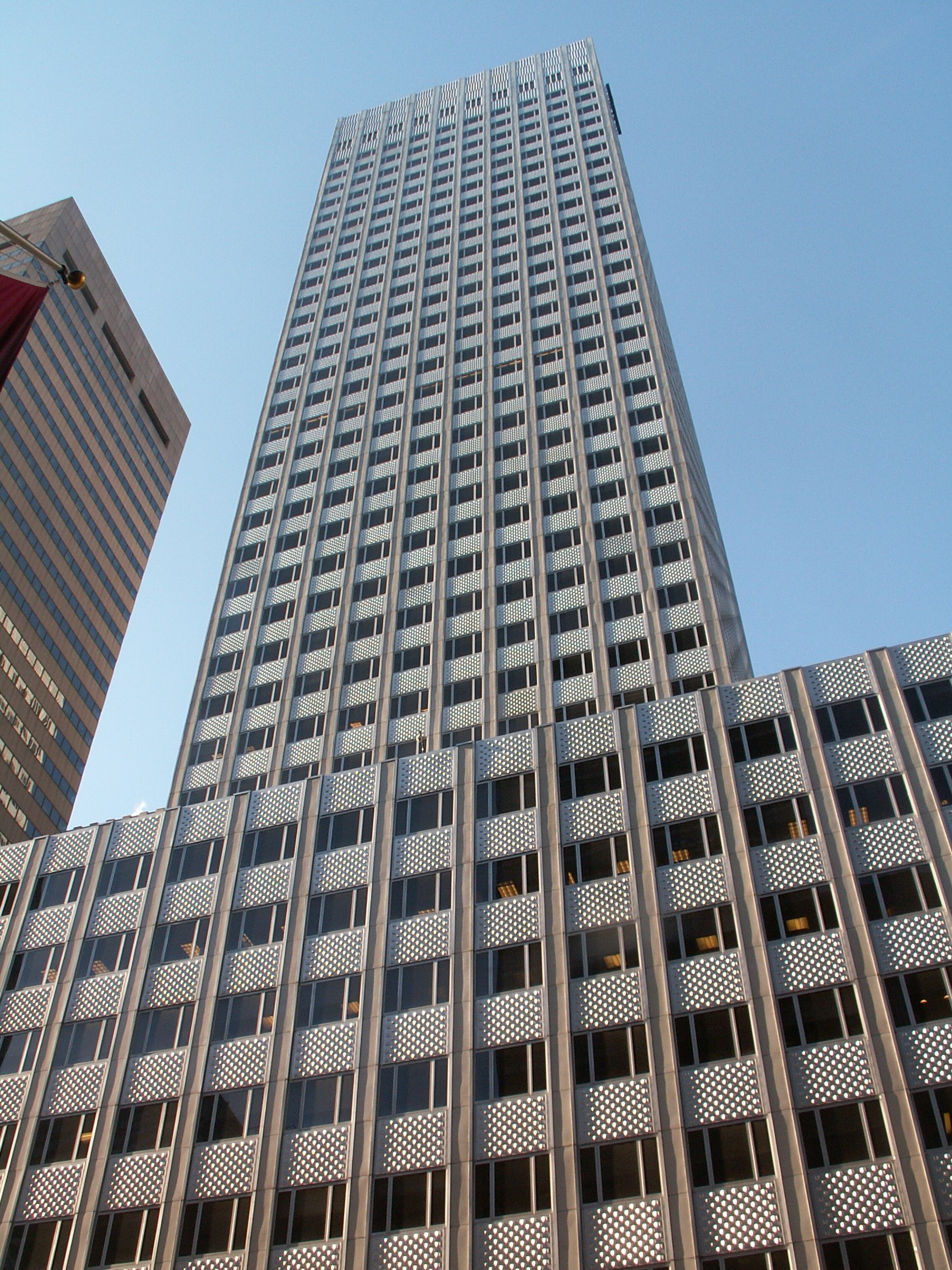
660 Fifth Avenue in New York City, designed by Carson & Lundin and completed in 1957.

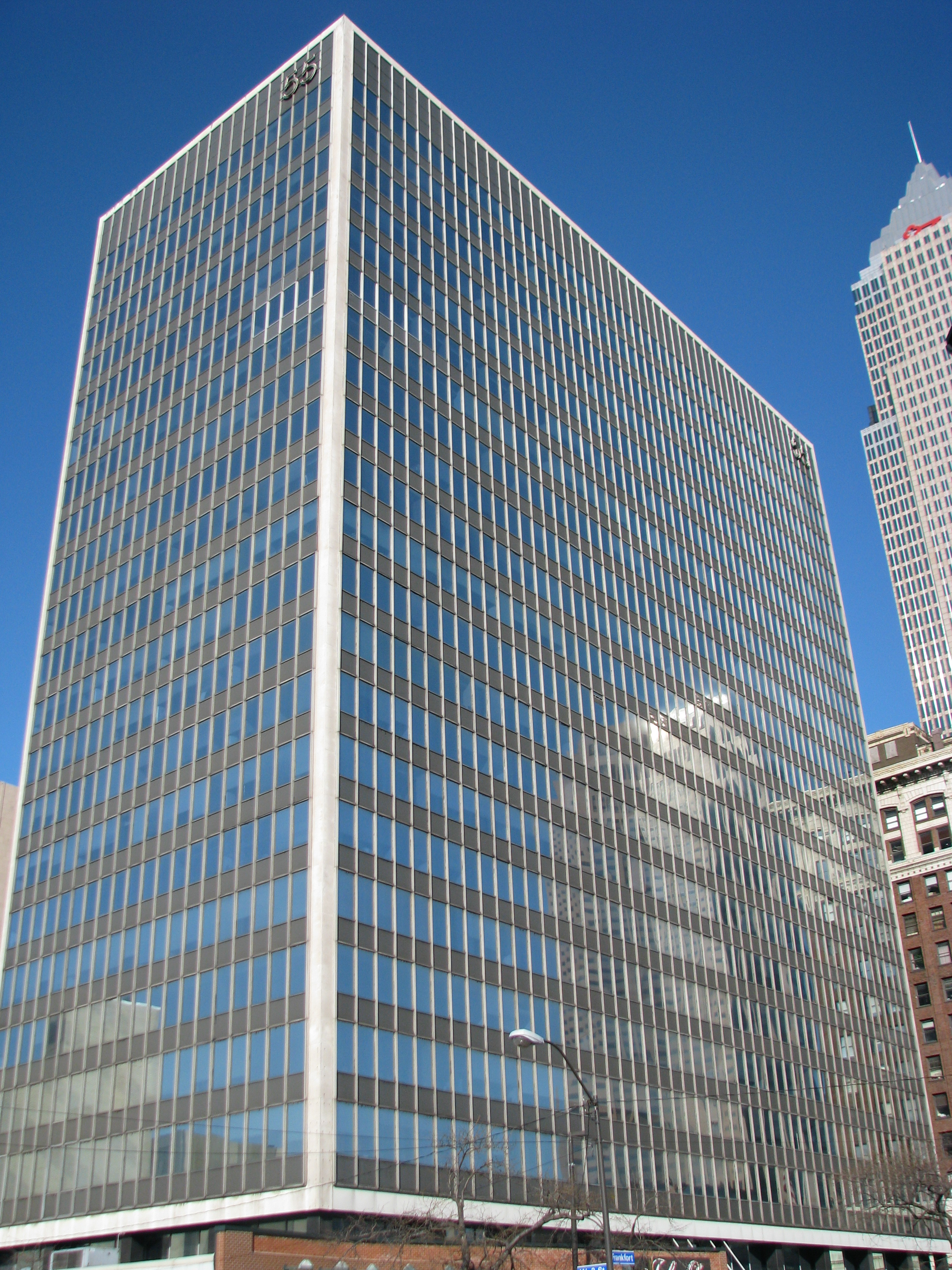
55 Public Square in Cleveland, designed by Carson & Lundin and completed in 1958.

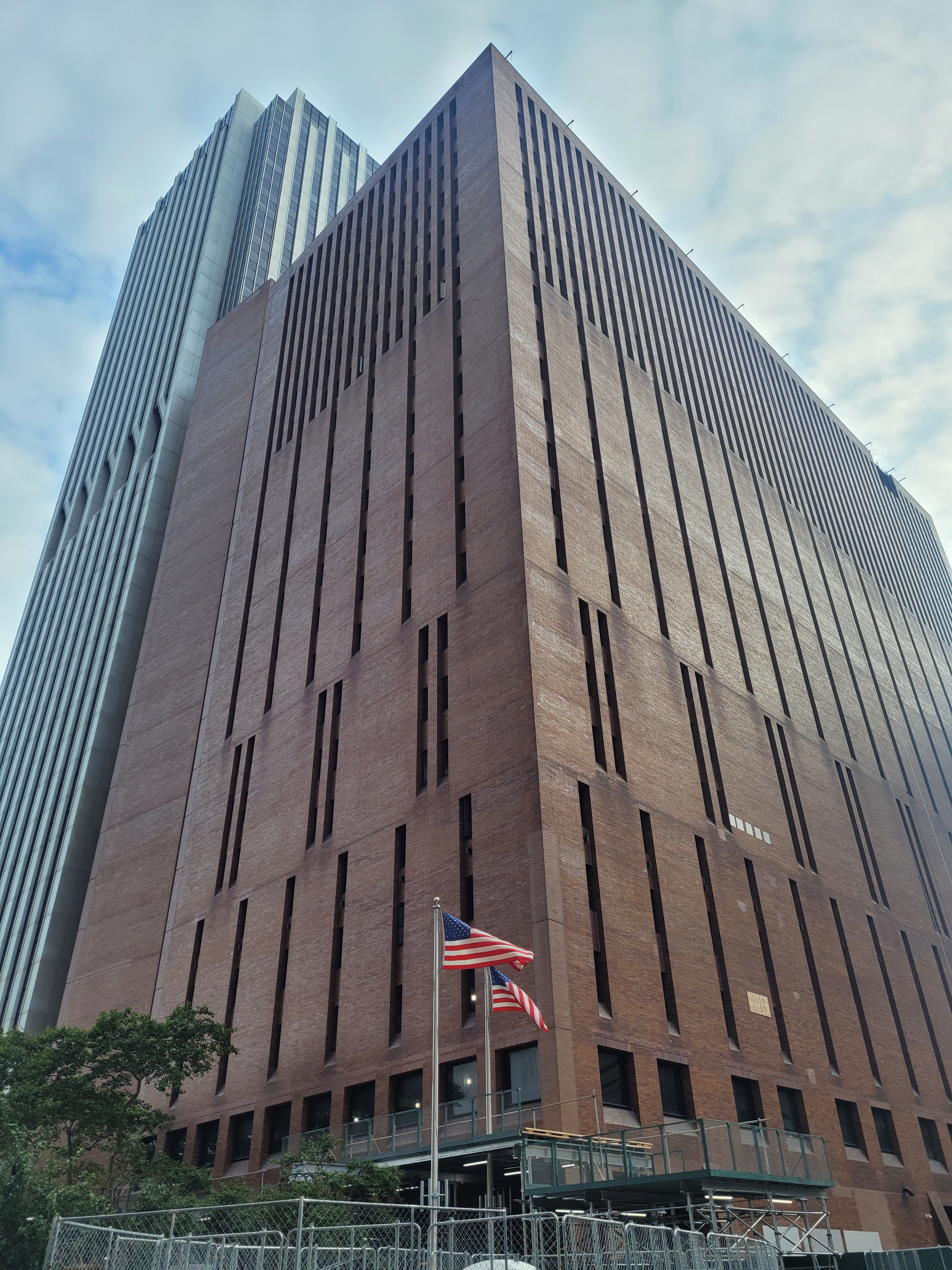
The former 4 New York Plaza in New York City, designed by Carson, Lundin & Shaw and completed in 1969.

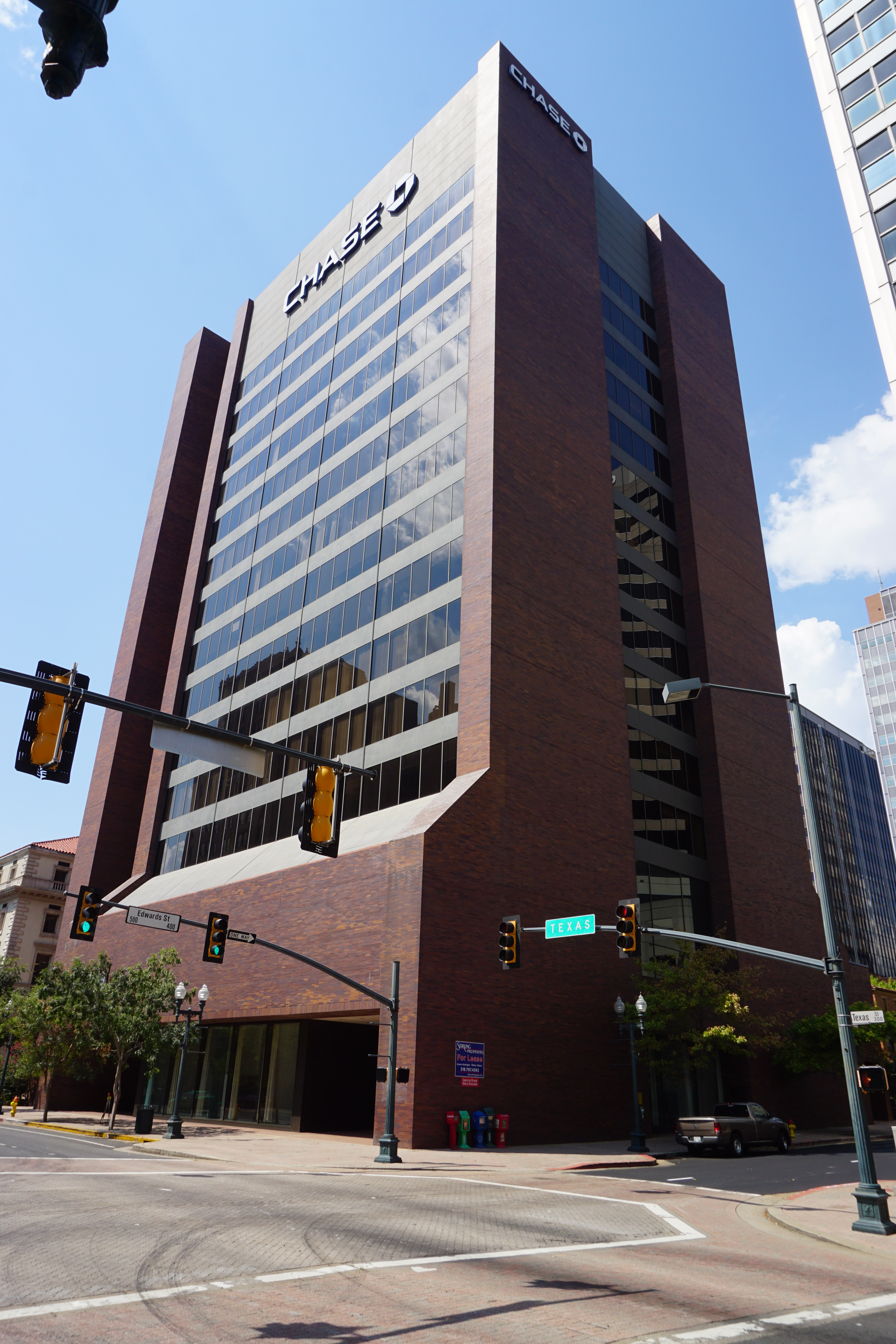
Chase Tower in Shreveport, Louisiana, designed by Carson, Lundin & Thorson and completed in 1976.

Carson & Lundin, later known as Carson, Lundin & Shaw and Carson, Lundin & Thorson, was an American architectural firm based in New York City and active from 1941 until 1996. It was formed initially by the 1941 partnership between architects Robert Carson and Earl H. Lundin.

== History and principals ==
The partnership of Carson & Lundin was formed in 1941 by Robert Carson and Earl H. Lundin, Resident Architects of Rockefeller Center Inc., the developers of Rockefeller Center.

Robert Carson FAIA was born July 19, 1906, in Macon, Illinois. He was educated at the University of Pennsylvania under Paul P. Cret, graduating in 1928 with a BArch. He worked for Raymond Hood and Harrison & Fouilhoux, the architects of Rockefeller Center, until the completion of the center in 1939. That year he and Earl H. Lundin, another Harrison employee, were named Resident Architects for the center's developers, in which role they would serve until 1957.

Earl H. Lundin AIA was born January 11, 1902, in Detroit he was educated at the University of Michigan, graduating in 1923. In 1930 he moved to New York City to join the Rockefeller architects, and along with Carson was appointed Resident Architect in 1939.

Building on their experience with Rockefeller Center, Carson & Lundin developed a specialty in the design of large office buildings. The first of these was 75 Rockefeller Plaza (1947), which was followed by major buildings in New York City and in other cities as far away as Tulsa and Cleveland. In 1957 the partnership was reorganized to include Arvin B. Shaw III, though the name of the firm was not changed.

Arvin B. Shaw III AIA was born March 7, 1916, in Los Angeles. He was educated at Yale University, graduating in 1939 with a BFA in architecture. He worked for Harrison & Fouilhoux in New York City until 1941, when he joined the navy for the duration of World War II. In 1945 he returned to California and joined the office of Lutah Maria Riggs in Santa Barbara, for whom he had worked in the summers of 1937 and 1938. In 1951 he returned east, joining Carson & Lundin in 1955.

Carson died March 1, 1960, at the age of 53. Lundin and Shaw continued the firm under the name Carson, Lundin & Shaw. In 1962 Carson, Lundin & Shaw was one of seven firms considered to design the original World Trade Center, but lost the job to Minoru Yamasaki & Associates. Major projects completed during the 1960s include the quarter-mile long Swan Street Building (1968) in Albany, part of Empire State Plaza. In 1970 they were joined by a third partner, Robert L. Thorson.

Robert L. Thorson AIA was born April 9, 1930, in St. Ansgar, Iowa. He was educated at the University of Minnesota and the Harvard Graduate School of Design, graduating from the latter in 1957. He worked for I. M. Pei & Associates and Ulrich Franzen & Associates before joining Carson, Lundin & Shaw as a senior associate in 1969.

Shaw retired in 1972 and died May 29, 1973, at the age of 57. Lundin and Thorson continued under the name of Carson, Lundin & Thorson. Lundin died March 1, 1976, at the age of 74. Thorson, as the sole surviving partner, incorporated the firm in May as Carson Lundin & Thorson PC. In April of 1979 state officials had noticed that the heavy marble slabs that made up the facade of the firm's Swan Street Building (1968) had come loose and may be in danger of falling. Later, in August, the firm was sued for $28 million by the state for damages, while asking for an even larger sum from the contractors. The lawsuit was dismissed in 1983 because the statute of limitations had passed. The firm appears to have been responsible for little work after the fact. Thorson died November 13, 1992, at the age of 62. The firm was dissolved in 1996.

== Architectural works ==
All dates are date of completion.

=== Carson & Lundin, 1941–1960 ===
- 1947 – 75 Rockefeller Plaza, (Note: Designed by Carson & Lundin, architects, with Harrison & Abramovitz, consulting architects.) 15 W 51st St, New York City
- 1948 – I. Miller & Sons building, 75 Mamaroneck Ave, White Plains, New York
- 1950 – Esso Building, (Note: Designed by Lathrop Douglass, architect, with Carson & Lundin, associate architects.) 4045 Scenic Hwy, Baton Rouge, Louisiana
- 1950 – First National Bank Building, 15 E 5th St, Tulsa, Oklahoma
- 1952 – 600 Fifth Avenue, New York City
- 1953 – Ridgeway School, 225 Ridgeway Cir, White Plains, New York
- 1955 – Liberty Life Insurance Company Building, 2000 Wade Hampton Blvd, Greenville, South Carolina
- 1955 – NYCHA Cypress Hills Houses, 475 Fountain Ave, Brooklyn
- 1956 – FDNY Engine 28/Ladder 11, 222 E 2nd St, New York City
- 1956 – PS 175 Henry H. Garnet, 175 W 134th St, New York City
- 1957 – 660 Fifth Avenue, New York City
- 1958 – 55 Public Square, Cleveland
- 1958 – 125 Maiden Lane, New York City
- 1958 – Carrier Corporation administration and research center, (Note: Designed by Schmidt, Garden & Erikson, architects, with Carson & Lundin, consulting architects. Demolished.) 4800 Carrier Pkwy, DeWitt, New York
- 1958 – Deering Milliken Building, (Note: Demolished in 2009.) 1045 Sixth Ave, New York City
- 1959 – 730 Third Ave, New York City
- 1961 – 399 Park Avenue, New York City
- 1962 – 28 East 28th Street, New York City
- 1962 – United States Courthouse and Emanuel Celler Federal Office Building, (Note: Designed by Carson & Lundin and Lorimer Rich & Associates, associated architects. Now incorporated into the Theodore Roosevelt United States Courthouse, completed in 2006.) 225 Cadman Plz E, Brooklyn

=== Carson, Lundin & Shaw, 1960–1972 ===
- 1963 – Brooklyn Savings Bank Building, 205 Montague St, Brooklyn
- 1963 – One Constitution Plaza, (Note: Designed by Kahn & Jacobs and Carson & Lundin, associated architects.) Hartford, Connecticut
- 1966 – 4 New York Plaza, 25 Water St, New York City
- 1966 – Chaney Dining Hall and Heritage Residence Hall, State University of New York at Canton, Canton, New York
- 1966 – Union Bank Building, 300 Ottawa Ave NW, Grand Rapids, Michigan
- 1967 – French and Nevaldine Halls, State University of New York at Canton, Canton, New York
- 1967 – Mohawk and Payson Residence Halls, State University of New York at Canton, Canton, New York
- 1968 – Cook and Payson Halls, Miller Campus Center and Southworth Library, State University of New York at Canton, Canton, New York
- 1968 – Smith Residence Hall, State University of New York at Canton, Canton, New York
- 1968 – Swan Street Building, Empire State Plaza, Albany, New York
- 1969 – 25 Park Place, (Note: Designed by Carson, Lundin & Shaw, architects, with Abreu & Robeson, associate architects.) 25 Park Pl NE, Atlanta
- 1969 – Dana Hall, State University of New York at Canton, Canton, New York
- 1971 – Cooper Service Complex, State University of New York at Canton, Canton, New York
- 1972 – Faculty Office Building and Wicks Hall, State University of New York at Canton, Canton, New York

=== Carson, Lundin & Thorson, 1972–1976 ===
- 1972 – Belson Hall, St. John's University, Queens
- 1976 – Chase Tower, (Note: Constructed originally for the First National Bank of Shreveport.) 400 Texas St, Shreveport, Louisiana

=== Carson Lundin & Thorson PC, 1976–1996 ===
- 1990 – Dawnwood Apartments, 500 Fairview Ave, Hudson, New York
- 1994 – Finley Hall, St. John's University, Queens
