= 55 Public Square =

22-story skyscraper in Cleveland Ohio

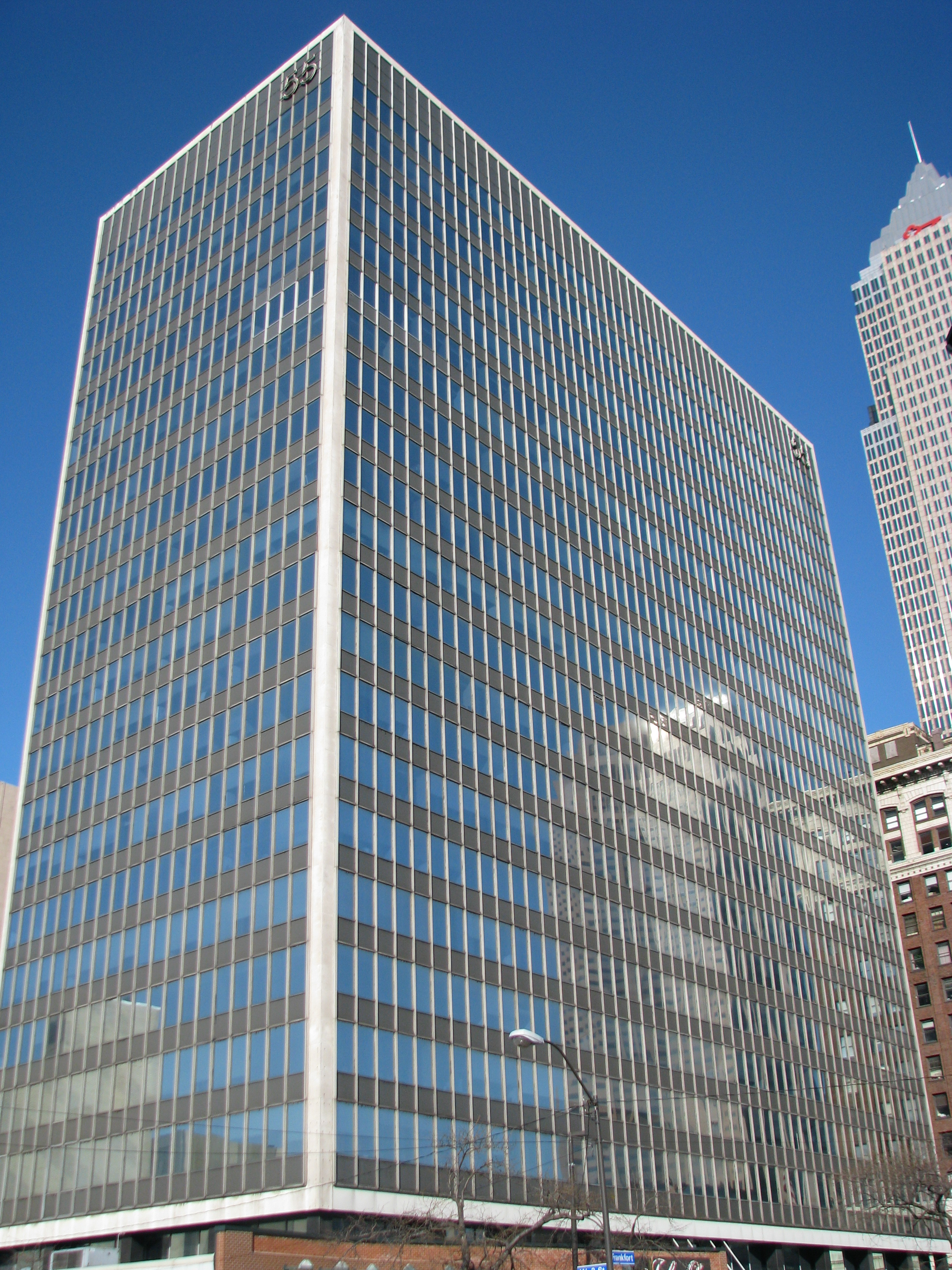
- 55 Public Square
- Interactive map of the 55 Public Square area

General information
- Status: Completed
- Type: office
- Location: Cleveland, Ohio
- Coordinates: 41.500263°N 81.696039°W
- Estimated completion: 1958
- Owner: Optima International LLC.

Height
- Top floor: 300 feet (91 m)

Technical details
- Floor count: 22
- Floor area: 430,000 square feet (40,000 m^{2})

Design and construction
- Architect: Carson & Lundin
- Main contractor: George A. Fuller Company

55 Public Square (formerly known as the Illuminating Building, after the Illuminating Company, the building's primary tenant) is a 22-story skyscraper located at number 55 Public Square, the town square of downtown Cleveland, Ohio. Designed by Carson & Lundin, it is 300 feet (91 m) tall, was completed in 1958, and was the first new skyscraper built in Cleveland since the Terminal Tower complex was completed in 1930. It was also the first tall International Style building in the city and the first to use a reinforced concrete frame.

== Design and history ==
Like other modernist office towers of its time (including the Seagram Building, built in the same year), it is set back from the street by a small pedestrian plaza, which is interrupted only by a single-story restaurant at one end. The tower was initially intended to employ a steel frame, but reinforced concrete was used for the upper 12 floors because of a steel shortage. A seven-story parking garage adjoins the north side. The building was constructed at a cost of $17 million, and was first owned by Vincent Astor and the Brooks-Harvey Co. of New York City. Willett Properties LLC. of Rye, New York purchased the building in late 2003, and owned it until July 2008 when it was sold to Optima International LLC for $34 million, a Miami-based real estate investment firm led by Chaim Schochet and 2/3rd owned by the Privat Group, one of Ukraine's largest business and banking groups. It is classified as class B office space.

55 Public Square is reminiscent of New York City's Lever House, by Gordon Bunshaft. The Lever House and 55 Public Square are almost identical looking with similar proportions and their curtain walls. A main difference is that Lever House has 250,000 square feet (23,000 m^{2}) while 55 Public Square has 430,000 square feet (40,000 m^{2}).

The structure was built on the site of Charles F. Brush's first arc lamp, which in 1879 was the world's first electric street light, and a replica of the lamp hangs outside the restaurant. Also previously on the site were the third and fourth Cuyahoga County courthouses. The third was built in 1860, and was replaced by the fourth in 1875, which in turn was replaced by the current Cuyahoga County Courthouse on Lakeside Avenue in 1912. Courthouse number four was demolished in 1931 for a parking lot.

In 2005, there was small fire on the building's 18th floor which according to the Cleveland Fire Department was caused by a piece of overheated office equipment. The Cleveland Fire Department had contained the fire to the 18th floor, the only thing lost was a piece of glass window and a few smoke covered panels. The office was renovated and cleaned up.

In 2013, First National Bank of Pennsylvania acquired Cleveland's Parkview Federal and moved Parkview Federal from its Solon Headquarters to the Illuminating building. The bank put new signage and modernized the 55 on the building.

The building was sold in 2018 to The K&D Group, a properties company with significant holdings in Cleveland. At the time of sale the building was partially vacant, with the First National Bank and Law Offices of Cleveland as the largest tenants. K&D turned much of the space into apartments, moving offices to the top floors.

From 1959 to 2013, John Q's Steakhouse was located just outside the base of the building, with outdoor seating on the plaza in front of the building during summer months. Originally owned by Stouffer's, John Q's was sold in the 1980s but retained its name. The restaurant was highly popular with residents and celebrities for a number of years and was slated to be replaced by another steakhouse. Noted chef Rocco Whalen opened a restaurant called Fahrenheit in the space July 13, 2023.

== See also ==
- List of tallest buildings in Cleveland
