= Cypress Hills Houses =

Public housing development in Brooklyn, New York

- NYCHA Property
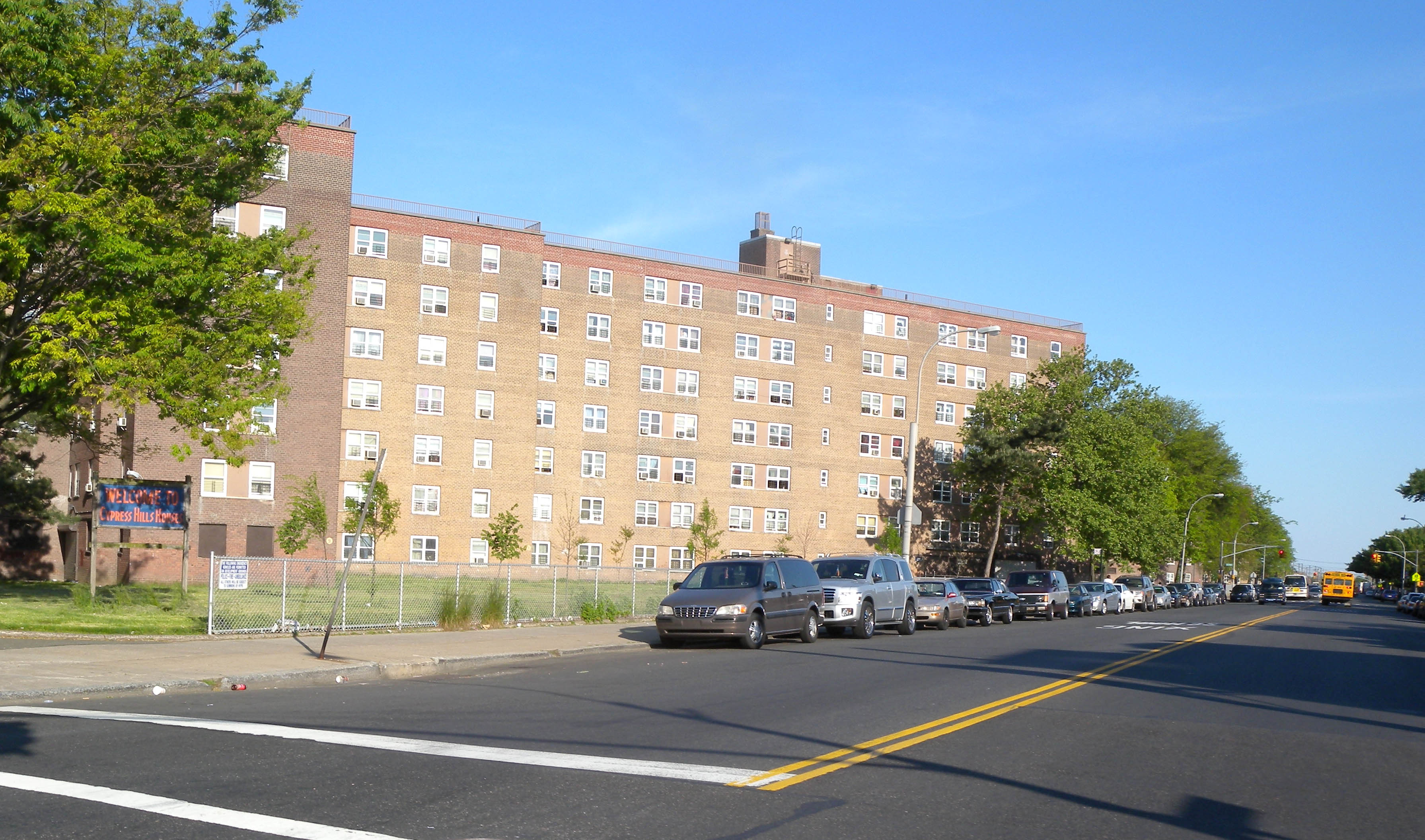
- Interactive map of Cypress Hills Houses
- Country: United States
- State: New York
- City: New York City
- Borough: Brooklyn

Area
  - Total: 28.75 acres (11.63 ha)

Population
  - Total: 2,824
- Zip Code: 11208

The Cypress Hills Houses is a NYCHA Housing Project with 11 buildings that are 7-stories tall. Located between Sutter Avenue to Linden Boulevard and also between Fountain to Euclid Avenues in the East New York neighborhood of Brooklyn, the Cypress Hills Houses were designed by the architectural firm of Carson & Lundin and completed in May 1955.

== History ==
The Cypress Hills Branch of the Brooklyn Public Library opened at the complex in September 1955 and was the first branch of the public library system to open in a housing project; it was replaced in 1995 by a new building located on the north side of Sutter Avenue.

In May 1967, two experimental playgrounds designed by architect Charles Forberg opened at the complex. The larger of the two circular playgrounds was 72 feet (22 m) in diameter and contained a pattern of 7-foot-tall (2.1 m) concrete slabs. The $70,000 project was sponsored by NYCHA, the Museum of Modern Art and the Park Association of New York City.

=== 21st Century ===
In early 2018, the Roma Scaffolding company started replacing built-up roofs with a new fluid-applied system and destroyed smoke rooms and chimneys, restored brickwork, changed the roof railings, and changed the 90 doors within the housing project.

== See also ==
- New York City Housing Authority
