= 2018 United States Senate election in Ohio =

2018 U.S Senate election in Ohio

- November 6, 2018
- Turnout: 55.79% (registered voters) ▼14.75pp
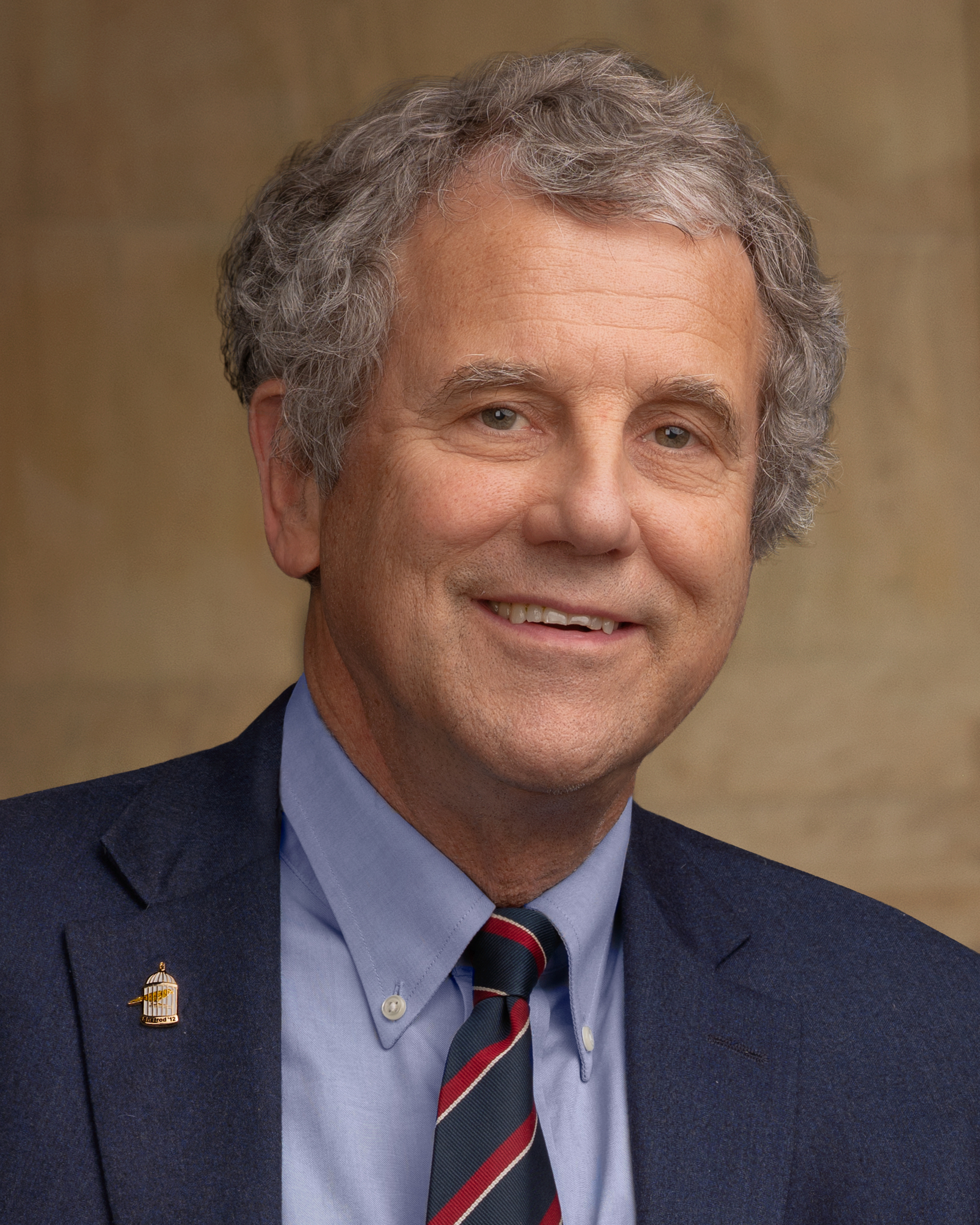

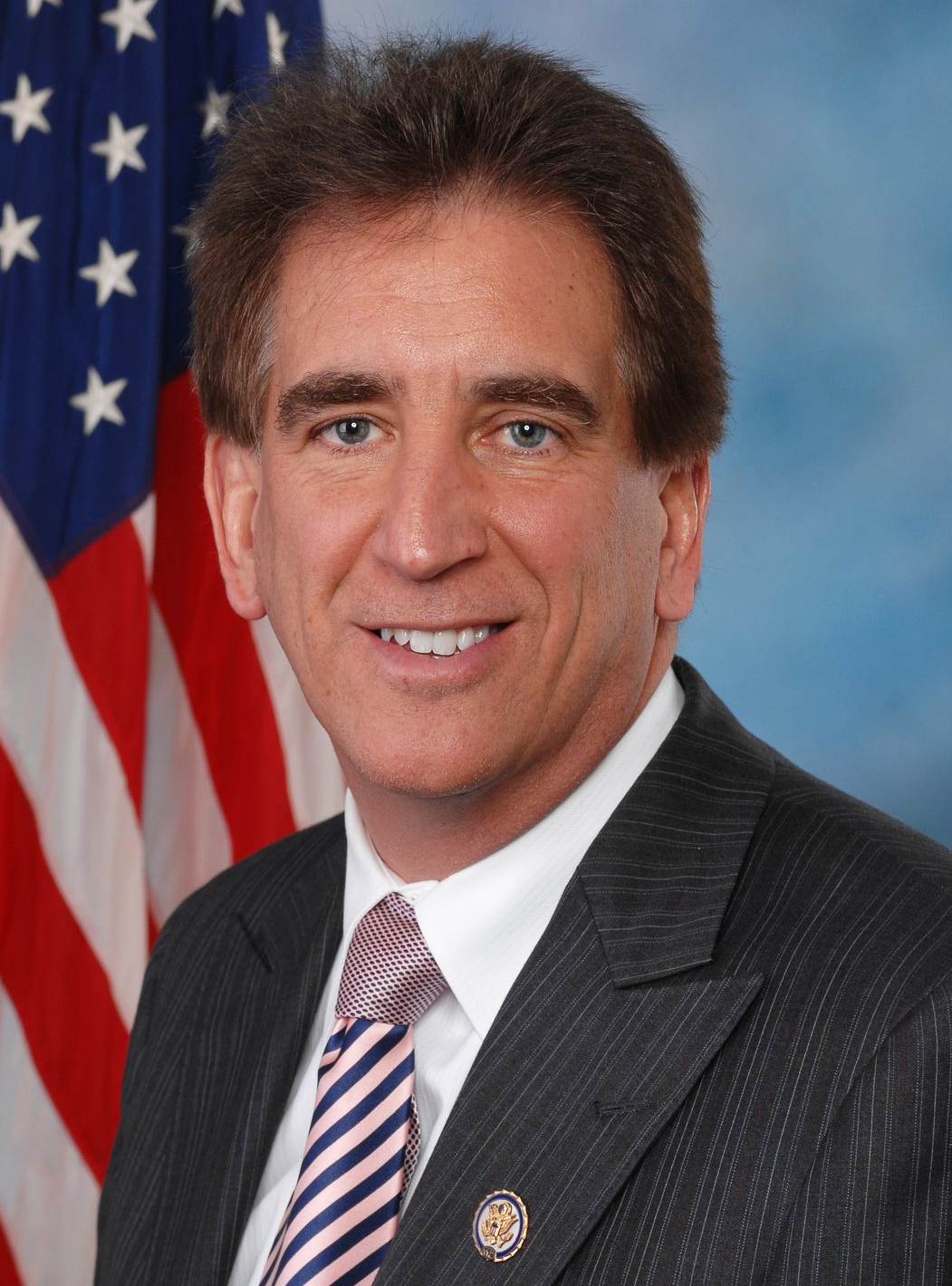
Nominee	Sherrod Brown	Jim Renacci
Party	Democratic	Republican
Popular vote	2,358,508	2,057,559
Percentage	53.40%	46.58%
- Brown: 40–50% 50–60% 60–70% 70–80% 80–90% >90% Renacci: 40–50% 50–60% 60–70% 70–80% 80–90% >90% Tie: 50% No votes
U.S. senator before election
Sherrod Brown
Democratic
Elected U.S. Senator
Sherrod Brown
Democratic

The 2018 United States Senate election in Ohio took place on November 6, 2018. The candidate filing deadline was February 7, 2018; the primary election was held on May 8, 2018. Incumbent Senator Sherrod Brown—the only remaining elected Democratic statewide officeholder in Ohio at the time of the election—won his bid for a third term, defeating Republican U.S. Representative Jim Renacci by a 6.82% margin in the general election, larger than the 6% margin in the election six years earlier. That was despite Republicans winning all statewide executive offices on the same ballot, and was one of ten Democratic-held Senate seats up for election in a state won by Donald Trump in the 2016 presidential election. Renacci conceded defeat on November 7, 2018.

With Republican Mike DeWine winning the concurrent gubernatorial election, this was the first time since 1974 that Ohio simultaneously voted for a gubernatorial nominee and a U.S. Senate nominee of opposite parties. This is the last time the Democratic Party won a partisan statewide race in Ohio until 2026.

== Democratic primary ==
=== Candidates ===
==== Nominee ====
- Sherrod Brown, incumbent U.S. senator

=== Results ===
Democratic primary results
Party	Candidate	Votes	%
Democratic	Sherrod Brown (incumbent)	613,373	100.00%
Total votes		613,373	100.00%

== Republican primary ==
=== Candidates ===
==== Nominee ====
- Jim Renacci, U.S. representative

==== Eliminated in primary ====
- Melissa Ackison, businesswoman
- Don Elijah Eckhart, candidate for the Republican nomination in 2016
- Mike Gibbons, investment banker (founder of Brown Gibbons Lang & Company)
- Dennis Jones
- Dan Kiley

==== Withdrawn ====
- Josh Mandel, Ohio State Treasurer and nominee for the U.S. Senate in 2012

==== Declined ====
- Ken Blackwell, former mayor of Cincinnati, former Ohio State Treasurer, and former Ohio Secretary of State
- Rick Jones, Butler County sheriff
- John Kasich, governor of Ohio, former U.S. representative
- Mary Taylor, lieutenant governor of Ohio (ran for governor)
- Pat Tiberi, U.S. representative
- Jim Tressel, president of Youngstown State University and former Ohio State football coach
- JD Vance, author and venture capitalist

=== Endorsements ===
Mike Gibbons

U.S. senators

- Rand Paul, U.S. senator from Kentucky (2011–) and 2016 presidential candidate

Individuals

- Fred Dailey, former Ohio Agriculture Director
- Doug Dieken
- Wes Farno, former chair of the Auglaize County Republican Party
- Charlie Frye, chair of the Ashtabula County Republican Party
- Christopher Gagin, chair of the Belmont County Republican Party
- Steve Hall, chair of the Coschocton County Republican Party
- Larry Hardin, chair of the Morrow County Republican Party
- Richard Jones, sheriff of Butler County
- Thad Lichtensteiger, chair of the Van Wert County Republican Party
- Bo Pelini, Youngstown State Penguins football coach, former Nebraska Cornhuskers football coach
- Phil Plummer, sheriff of Montgomery County and chair of Montgomery County Republican Party
- Rob Radway, chair of the Hardin County Republican Party
- Ethan Reynolds, mayor of New Carlisle
- Jim Roberts, chair of the Seneca County Republican Party
- Carolyn Robey-Warren, president of Ohio Carry

State representatives

- Marilyn Reid (former)
- Andy Thompson

State senators

- Randy Gardner (Majority Leader)
- Frank Hoagland
- Jay Hottinger
- Matt Huffman
- Joy Padgett (former), current chairwoman of Ohio Women for Trump

County commissioners

- Jeff Benton, Delaware County commissioner
- Rodney Creech, Preble County commissioner
- Mike Kerschner, Seneca County commissioner
- Shayne Thomas, Seneca County commissioner
- Jenny Vermillion, Crawford County commissioner
- Doug Weisenauer, Crawford County commissioner

Organizations

- America's Liberty PAC
- Citizens for Trump
- Cuyahoga Valley Republicans
- Ohio Carry
- Right to Life Action Coalition of Ohio
- Tea Party Express

County parties

- Clermont County Republican Party
- Defiance County Republican Party
- Franklin County Republican Party
- Knox County Republican Party
- Madison County Republican Party
- Miami County Republican Party
Josh Mandel (withdrawn)

U.S. senators

- Tom Cotton, U.S. senator (R-AR)
- Ted Cruz, U.S. senator (R-TX), and 2016 presidential candidate
- Mike Lee, U.S. senator (R-UT)
- Rob Portman, U.S. senator (R-OH)
- Marco Rubio, U.S. senator (R-FL), and 2016 presidential candidate
- Pat Toomey, U.S. senator (R-PA)

Individuals

- Mike Cernovich, conservative activist and writer
- Jack Posobiec, conservative activist

Labor unions

- CPPA – Cleveland Police Patrolmen's Association

Organizations

- Citizens United
- Club for Growth
- FreedomWorks
- Senate Conservatives Fund
- Tea Party Express

=== Polling ===
Poll source	Date(s) administered	Sample size	Margin of error	Melissa Ackison	Don Eckhart	Mike Gibbons	Dan Kiley	Jim Renacci	Undecided
Baldwin Wallace University	April 24 – May 2, 2018	323	–	4%	1%	11%	4%	25%	55%
Fallon Research	April 4–7, 2018	502	± 4.4%	3%	2%	7%	1%	21%	65%
OnMessage (R-Renacci)	March 20, 2018	–	–	3%	3%	8%	3%	36%	47%
SurveyUSA	March 16–20, 2018	541	± 5.7%	5%	5%	10%	1%	21%	58%

Hypothetical polling

with Josh Mandel

Poll source	Date(s) administered	Sample size	Margin of error	Melissa Ackison	Michael Gibbons	Josh Mandel	Undecided
Remington Research Group (R-Mandel)	September 26–28, 2017	1,268	± 2.8%	5%	5%	50%	40%

with Matt Huffman

Poll source	Date(s) administered	Sample size	Margin of error	Matt Huffman	Josh Mandel	Undecided
Club for Growth	December 11–12, 2016	600	± 4.0%	8%	62%	30%

with Pat Tiberi

Poll source	Date(s) administered	Sample size	Margin of error	Josh Mandel	Pat Tiberi	Undecided
Club for Growth	December 11–12, 2016	600	± ?%	60%	12%	27%

=== Results ===
Results by county: Renacci: 70–80%; 60–70%; 50–60%; 40–50%; <40%; Gibbons: <40%; 40–50%; 50–60%; Ackison: <40%

Republican primary results
Party	Candidate	Votes	%
Republican	Jim Renacci	363,622	47.34%
Republican	Mike Gibbons	243,426	31.69%
Republican	Melissa Ackison	100,543	13.09%
Republican	Dan Kiley	30,684	3.99%
Republican	Don Eckhart	29,796	3.88%
Write-in		78	0.01%
Total votes		768,149	100.00%

== General election ==
=== Candidates ===
- Sherrod Brown (D)
- Stephen Faris (I, write-in)
- Philena Irene Farley (G, write-in)
- Bruce Jaynes (L, write-in)
- Jim Renacci (R)

=== Debates ===
- Complete video of debate, October 14, 2018
- Complete video of debate, October 20, 2018
- Complete video of debate, October 26, 2018

=== Endorsements ===
Sherrod Brown (D)

U.S. executive branch officials

- Madeleine Albright, author and former U.S. Secretary of State
- Joe Biden, 47th vice president of the United States
- Barack Obama, 44th president of the United States

U.S. senators

- Cory Booker, New Jersey (2013-present)
- Chris Coons, Delaware (2010-present)
- Al Franken, former Minnesota (2009-2018)
- Kamala Harris, California (2017-2021)
- Amy Klobuchar, Minnesota (2007-present)
- Patty Murray, Washington (1993-present)
- Gary Peters, Michigan (2015-present)
- Elizabeth Warren, Massachusetts (2013-present)

U.S. representatives

- Joyce Beatty, U.S. representative (OH-03)

Statewide officials

- Justin Fairfax, lieutenant governor of Virginia (2018-2022)
- Martin O'Malley, former governor of Maryland

Local officials

- Nan Whaley, mayor of Dayton (2014-2022)

Individuals

- John Legend, singer
- Amy Schumer, actress

Labor unions

- National Education Association
- Ohio State AFL–CIO
- United Automobile Workers
- United Mine Workers of America

Organizations

- Council for a Livable World
- Democracy for America
- End Citizens United
- Feminist Majority Political Action Committee
- Human Rights Campaign
- J Street
- League of Conservation Voters Action Fund
- LegitAction
- MoveOn.org
- National Committee to Preserve Social Security and Medicare
- National Organization for Women
- Natural Resources Defense Council
- Ohio Society of CPAs
- Ohio State Medical Association
- Population Connection
- Sierra Club
- Students for Gun Legislation
Jim Renacci (R)

U.S. executive branch officials

- Mike Pence, vice president of the United States
- Donald Trump, president of the United States

U.S. senators

- Rob Portman, U.S. senator (R-OH)

Statewide office holders

- Josh Mandel, Ohio treasurer
- Mary Taylor, lieutenant governor of Ohio

State representatives

- Steve Hambley

U.S. representatives

- Steve Chabot (OH-1)
- Warren Davidson (OH-8)
- Bob Gibbs (OH-7)
- Bill Johnson (OH-6)
- Jim Jordan (OH-4)
- David Joyce (OH-14)
- Bob Latta (OH-5)
- Steve Stivers (OH-15)
- Mike Turner (OH-10)
- Brad Wenstrup (OH-2)

Mayors

- Rob Duncan, Norwalk
- Bob Meilander, Kipton

Individuals

- Anthony Scaramucci, former White House Communications Director
- Donald Trump Jr., businessman and son of U.S. President Donald Trump
- Eric Trump, businessman and son of U.S. President Donald Trump

County parties

- Brown County Republican Party
- Cuyahoga County Republican Party
- Fulton County Republican Party
- Lake County Republican Party
- Preble County Republican Party
- Summit County Republican Party

Organizations

- Business-Industry Political Action Committee
- Cuyahoga Valley Republicans
- National Federation of Independent Business
- NRA Political Victory Fund
- Ohio Black Republican Association
- Ohio Right to Life
- Ohio Society of CPAs
- Ohioans for Concealed Carry
- Students for Trump

State parties

- Ohio Republican Party

=== Predictions ===
Source	Ranking	As of
The Cook Political Report	Likely D	October 26, 2018
Inside Elections	Safe D	November 1, 2018
Sabato's Crystal Ball	Likely D	November 5, 2018
Fox News (Note: The Fox News Midterm Power Rankings uniquely does not contain a category for Safe/Solid races)	Likely D	November 5, 2018
CNN	Likely D	November 5, 2018
RealClearPolitics	Lean D	November 5, 2018
FiveThirtyEight	Safe D	November 6, 2018

=== Polling ===
View source data.

Poll source	Date(s) administered	Sample size	Margin of error	Sherrod Brown (D)	Jim Renacci (R)	Other	Undecided
Change Research	November 2–4, 2018	923	–	53%	43%	–	–
Research Co.	November 1–3, 2018	450	± 4.6%	53%	39%	–	8%
Cygnal (R)	October 30–31, 2018	503	± 4.4%	52%	42%	–	6%
Gravis Marketing	October 29–30, 2018	789	± 3.5%	46%	37%	–	17%
Emerson College	October 26–28, 2018	566	± 4.3%	49%	43%	2%	6%
Baldwin Wallace University	October 19–27, 2018	1,051	± 3.8%	51%	32%	–	17%
Suffolk University	October 4–8, 2018	500	± 4.4%	54%	36%	0%	10%
Baldwin Wallace University	September 8 – October 8, 2018	1,017	± 3.5%	50%	33%	–	18%
University of Akron	September 10 – October 4, 2018	1,000	± 3.0%	43%	31%	–	26%
Ipsos	September 13–21, 2018	1,074	± 3.0%	50%	39%	2%	9%
Triton Polling & Research (R)	September 18–20, 2018	1,003	± 3.1%	53%	42%	–	5%
NBC News/Marist	September 16–20, 2018	564 LV	± 5.0%	49%	35%	7%	8%
NBC News/Marist	September 16–20, 2018	564 LV	± 5.0%	52%	39%	1%	7%
NBC News/Marist	September 16–20, 2018	796 RV	± 4.2%	49%	33%	10%	9%
NBC News/Marist	September 16–20, 2018	796 RV	± 4.2%	52%	39%	1%	8%
Baldwin Wallace University	September 5–15, 2018	1,048	± 3.6%	49%	32%	–	19%
Morning Consult	September 2–11, 2018	1,592	± 2.0%	47%	31%	–	22%
Change Research (D-Innovation Ohio)	August 31 – September 4, 2018	822	± 3.0%	46%	42%	–	12%
TRZ Communications (R-WTPC)	June 30 – July 10, 2018	1,485	± 3.0%	45%	41%	–	14%
SurveyMonkey/Axios	June 11 – July 2, 2018	951	± 5.0%	52%	44%	–	4%
NBC News/Marist	June 17–22, 2018	778	± 4.4%	51%	38%	1%	10%
Quinnipiac University	June 7–12, 2018	1,082	± 3.7%	51%	34%	1%	12%
Suffolk University	June 6–11, 2018	500	± 4.4%	53%	37%	2%	8%
America First Action (R)	May 29–31, 2018	400	± 4.9%	45%	41%	–	10%
Fallon Research	May 21–25, 2018	800	± 3.5%	48%	34%	3%	15%
Grassroots Targeting (R-Ohio First)	April 2018	1,266	–	41%	40%	–	19%
SurveyUSA	March 16–20, 2018	1,408	± 3.5%	52%	38%	–	11%
Baldwin Wallace University	February 28 – March 9, 2018	1,011	± 3.0%	41%	29%	–	30%
SurveyMonkey/Axios	February 12 – March 5, 2018	1,995	± 3.6%	50%	45%	–	5%
Grassroots Targeting (R-Ohio First)	February 2018	–	–	43%	38%	–	19%

Hypothetical polling

with Mike Gibbons

Poll source	Date(s) administered	Sample size	Margin of error	Sherrod Brown (D)	Mike Gibbons (R)	Undecided
SurveyUSA	March 16–20, 2018	1,408	± 3.5%	52%	38%	10%
Baldwin Wallace University	February 28 – March 9, 2018	1,011	± 3.0%	41%	31%	28%

with Melissa Ackison

Poll source	Date(s) administered	Sample size	Margin of error	Sherrod Brown (D)	Melissa Ackison (R)	Undecided
SurveyUSA	March 16–20, 2018	1,408	± 3.5%	52%	37%	11%

with Don Eckhart

Poll source	Date(s) administered	Sample size	Margin of error	Sherrod Brown (D)	Don Eckhart (R)	Undecided
SurveyUSA	March 16–20, 2018	1,408	± 3.5%	53%	37%	10%

with Dan Kiley

Poll source	Date(s) administered	Sample size	Margin of error	Sherrod Brown (D)	Dan Kiley (R)	Undecided
SurveyUSA	March 16–20, 2018	1,408	± 3.5%	52%	37%	11%

with Pat Tiberi

Poll source	Date(s) administered	Sample size	Margin of error	Sherrod Brown (D)	Pat Tiberi (R)	Undecided
Gravis Marketing	April 27 – May 2, 2017	1,352	± 2.7%	43%	41%	16%

with Josh Mandel

Poll source	Date(s) administered	Sample size	Margin of error	Sherrod Brown (D)	Josh Mandel (R)	Undecided
Luntz Global	June 12, 2017	500	± 4.4%	53%	34%	13%
Gravis Marketing	April 27 – May 2, 2017	1,352	± 2.7%	42%	45%	13%
WPA Opinion Research (R)	November 29 – December 1, 2016	600	± 4.0%	39%	40%	21%
Public Policy Polling	July 22–24, 2016	1,334	± 2.7%	45%	36%	18%
Public Policy Polling	April 26–27, 2016	799	± 3.2%	47%	33%	21%

=== Results ===
Township results

State House district results

United States Senate election in Ohio, 2018
Party	Candidate	Votes	%	±%
Democratic	Sherrod Brown (incumbent)	2,358,508	53.40%	+2.70%
Republican	Jim Renacci	2,057,559	46.58%	+1.88%
Write-in		1,017	0.02%	N/A
Total votes		4,417,084	100.00%	N/A
Democratic hold				

==== By county ====
County	Sherrod Brown Democratic		Jim Renacci Republican		Write In Other parties		Margin		Total votes cast
County	#	%	#	%	#	%	#	%	Total votes cast
Adams	2,635	30.49%	6,000	69.42%	8	0.09%	-3,365	-38.93%	8,643
Allen	14,429	40.16%	21,492	59.82%	8	0.02%	-7,063	-19.66%	35,929
Ashland	6,472	34.94%	12,048	65.04%	3	0.02%	-5,576	-30.10%	18,523
Ashtabula	16,473	51.05%	15,794	48.95%	0	0.00%	679	2.10%	32,267
Athens	15,472	68.45%	7,126	31.53%	4	0.02%	8,346	36.92%	22,602
Auglaize	5,557	29.00%	13,603	70.99%	1	0.01%	-8,046	-41.99%	19,161
Belmont	11,603	46.84%	13,159	53.13%	7	0.03%	-1,556	-6.29%	24,769
Brown	4,651	31.35%	10,184	68.63%	3	0.02%	-5,533	-37.28%	14,838
Butler	55,604	40.96%	80,106	59.02%	26	0.02%	-24,502	-18.06%	135,736
Carroll	3,788	36.80%	6,503	63.18%	2	0.02%	-2,715	-26.38%	10,293
Champaign	5,443	36.74%	9,372	63.26%	0	0.00%	-3,929	-26.52%	14,815
Clark	23,525	49.03%	24,446	50.95%	9	0.02%	-921	-1.92%	47,980
Clermont	27,803	34.87%	51,918	65.12%	9	0.01%	-24,115	-30.25%	79,730
Clinton	4,645	30.96%	10,356	69.03%	1	0.01%	-5,711	-38.07%	15,002
Columbiana	13,995	39.04%	21,849	60.95%	3	0.01%	-7,854	-21.91%	35,847
Coshocton	4,680	39.51%	7,163	60.48%	1	0.01%	-2,483	-20.97%	11,844
Crawford	5,345	36.87%	9,149	63.11%	2	0.01%	-3,804	-26.24%	14,496
Cuyahoga	350,362	72.48%	132,948	27.50%	54	0.01%	217,414	44.98%	483,364
Darke	5,569	28.57%	13,921	71.42%	2	0.01%	-8,352	-42.85%	19,492
Defiance	5,812	42.05%	8,003	57.91%	5	0.04%	-2,191	-15.86%	13,820
Delaware	44,743	47.43%	49,587	52.56%	6	0.01%	-4,844	-5.13%	94,336
Erie	16,659	54.98%	13,633	45.00%	6	0.02%	3,026	9.98%	30,298
Fairfield	26,518	44.76%	32,707	55.21%	21	0.04%	-6,189	-10.45%	59,246
Fayette	2,914	34.36%	5,566	65.63%	1	0.01%	-2,652	-31.27%	8,481
Franklin	332,825	68.69%	151,588	31.29%	96	0.02%	181,237	37.40%	484,509
Fulton	6,707	41.49%	9,454	58.49%	3	0.02%	-2,747	-17.00%	16,164
Gallia	3,355	34.84%	6,275	65.16%	0	0.00%	-2,920	-30.32%	9,630
Geauga	19,104	44.94%	23,397	55.04%	6	0.01%	-4,293	-10.10%	42,507
Greene	30,243	44.23%	38,102	55.72%	32	0.05%	-7,859	-11.49%	68,377
Guernsey	5,014	39.97%	7,529	60.02%	2	0.02%	-2,515	-20.05%	12,545
Hamilton	200,404	59.34%	137,116	40.60%	193	0.06%	63,288	18.74%	337,713
Hancock	10,929	38.95%	17,123	61.02%	9	0.03%	-6,194	-22.07%	28,061
Hardin	3,497	37.19%	5,899	62.74%	6	0.06%	-2,402	-25.55%	9,402
Harrison	2,480	42.70%	3,327	57.28%	1	0.02%	-847	-14.58%	5,808
Henry	4,468	42.24%	6,109	57.76%	0	0.00%	-1,641	-15.52%	10,577
Highland	3,939	29.25%	9,526	70.75%	0	0.00%	-5,587	-41.50%	13,465
Hocking	4,408	44.60%	5,474	55.39%	1	0.01%	-1,066	-10.79%	9,883
Holmes	2,059	23.35%	6,755	76.61%	3	0.03%	-4,696	-53.26%	8,817
Huron	8,274	44.02%	10,522	55.98%	0	0.00%	-2,248	-11.96%	18,796
Jackson	3,815	37.88%	6,255	62.12%	0	0.00%	-2,440	-24.24%	10,070
Jefferson	11,376	46.32%	13,180	53.66%	6	0.02%	-1,804	-7.34%	24,562
Knox	8,413	37.05%	14,290	62.93%	4	0.02%	-5,877	-25.88%	22,707
Lake	49,276	52.08%	45,313	47.90%	18	0.02%	3,963	4.18%	94,607
Lawrence	8,064	39.61%	12,292	60.37%	4	0.02%	-4,228	-20.76%	20,360
Licking	29,469	42.94%	39,142	57.04%	11	0.02%	-9,673	-14.10%	68,622
Logan	5,235	31.77%	11,243	68.23%	1	0.01%	-6,008	-36.46%	16,479
Lorain	67,452	59.23%	46,403	40.75%	21	0.02%	21,049	18.48%	113,876
Lucas	100,807	66.74%	50,223	33.25%	18	0.01%	50,584	33.49%	151,048
Madison	5,116	37.25%	8,617	62.74%	1	0.01%	-3,501	-25.49%	13,734
Mahoning	54,594	60.49%	35,654	39.50%	8	0.01%	18,940	20.99%	90,256
Marion	8,677	42.23%	11,850	57.68%	19	0.09%	-3,173	-15.45%	20,546
Medina	34,493	46.00%	40,478	53.98%	15	0.02%	-5,985	-7.98%	74,986
Meigs	2,898	37.04%	4,926	62.95%	1	0.01%	-2,028	-25.91%	7,825
Mercer	4,504	26.27%	12,637	73.72%	2	0.01%	-8,133	-47.45%	17,143
Miami	14,649	35.33%	26,815	64.66%	5	0.01%	-12,166	-29.33%	41,469
Monroe	2,518	47.66%	2,765	52.34%	0	0.00%	-247	-4.68%	5,283
Montgomery	115,200	56.06%	90,242	43.92%	40	0.02%	24,958	12.14%	205,482
Morgan	2,115	42.04%	2,916	57.96%	0	0.00%	-801	-15.92%	5,031
Morrow	4,361	33.23%	8,761	66.76%	1	0.01%	-4,400	-33.53%	13,123
Muskingum	12,395	42.88%	16,504	57.10%	4	0.01%	-4,109	-14.22%	28,903
Noble	1,709	36.62%	2,958	63.38%	0	0.00%	-1,249	-26.76%	4,667
Ottawa	9,477	51.85%	8,799	48.14%	3	0.02%	678	3.71%	18,279
Paulding	2,232	32.40%	4,656	67.59%	1	0.01%	-2,424	-35.19%	6,889
Perry	4,599	40.01%	6,895	59.98%	1	0.01%	-2,296	-19.97%	11,495
Pickaway	7,481	37.81%	12,302	62.18%	2	0.01%	-4,821	-24.37%	19,785
Pike	3,900	44.33%	4,897	55.67%	0	0.00%	-997	-11.34%	8,797
Portage	32,303	53.34%	28,231	46.62%	22	0.04%	4,072	6.72%	60,556
Preble	4,942	31.31%	10,838	68.66%	4	0.03%	-5,896	-37.35%	15,784
Putnam	4,369	29.56%	10,408	70.41%	4	0.03%	-6,039	-40.85%	14,781
Richland	17,984	40.41%	26,499	59.55%	16	0.04%	-8,515	-19.14%	44,499
Ross	10,602	45.42%	12,738	54.57%	2	0.01%	-2,136	-9.15%	23,342
Sandusky	10,987	49.65%	11,141	50.34%	2	0.01%	-154	-0.69%	22,130
Scioto	10,627	44.95%	13,014	55.05%	0	0.00%	-2,387	-10.10%	23,641
Seneca	8,741	46.76%	9,945	53.20%	6	0.03%	-1,204	-6.44%	18,692
Shelby	5,183	27.84%	13,433	72.16%	0	0.00%	-8,250	-44.32%	18,616
Stark	68,526	49.24%	70,588	50.72%	49	0.04%	-2,062	-1.48%	139,163
Summit	129,479	60.86%	83,149	39.08%	117	0.05%	46,330	21.78%	212,745
Trumbull	43,381	57.93%	31,482	42.04%	19	0.03%	11,899	15.89%	74,882
Tuscarawas	14,088	43.57%	18,244	56.42%	3	0.01%	-4,156	-12.85%	32,335
Union	8,964	37.81%	14,747	62.19%	0	0.00%	-5,783	-24.38%	23,711
Van Wert	3,020	28.12%	7,721	71.88%	0	0.00%	-4,701	-43.76%	10,741
Vinton	1,641	39.95%	2,467	60.05%	0	0.00%	-826	-20.10%	4,108
Warren	35,815	35.96%	63,757	64.02%	20	0.02%	-27,942	-28.06%	99,592
Washington	9,259	39.96%	13,908	60.03%	3	0.01%	-4,649	-20.07%	23,170
Wayne	15,495	38.90%	24,324	61.07%	11	0.03%	-8,829	-22.17%	39,830
Williams	5,272	39.94%	7,927	60.05%	1	0.01%	-2,655	-20.11%	13,200
Wood	27,540	55.45%	22,105	44.51%	18	0.04%	5,435	10.94%	49,663
Wyandot	3,062	37.74%	5,051	62.26%	0	0.00%	-1,989	-24.52%	8,113
Totals	2,358,508	53.40%	2,057,559	46.58%	1,017	0.02%	300,949	6.82%	4,417,084

Counties that flipped from Democratic to Republican

- Pike (largest city: Waverly)
- Ross (largest city: Chillicothe)
- Scioto (largest city: Portsmouth)
- Belmont (largest city: Martins Ferry)
- Jefferson (largest city: Steubenville)
- Sandusky (largest city: Fremont)
- Clark (largest municipality: Springfield)
- Stark (largest city: Canton)
- Monroe (largest city: Woodsfield)

==== By congressional district ====
Brown won nine of 16 congressional districts, including five that elected Republicans to the House.

District	Brown	Renacci	Representative
1st	51%	49%	Steve Chabot
2nd	48%	52%	Brad Wenstrup
3rd	75%	25%	Joyce Beatty
4th	43%	57%	Jim Jordan
5th	47%	53%	Bob Latta
6th	41%	59%	Bill Johnson
7th	44%	56%	Bob Gibbs
8th	39%	61%	Warren Davidson
9th	68%	32%	Marcy Kaptur
10th	53%	47%	Mike Turner
11th	84%	16%	Marcia Fudge
12th	51%	49%	Troy Balderson
13th	62%	38%	Tim Ryan
14th	53%	47%	Dave Joyce
15th	51%	49%	Steve Stivers
16th	49.6%	50.4%	Jim Renacci (115th Congress)
16th	49.6%	50.4%	Anthony Gonzalez (116th Congress)

== Analysis ==
The election was not particularly close, with Brown winning by 6.82%. Brown was the only Democrat who won statewide in Ohio in this election cycle. He was able to win re-election by winning back most of the Rust Belt, which swung Republican in 2016. Brown did well in Portage County, Summit County, and Trumbull County, all very heavily pro-union counties. Brown also did well in the rust belt from Lucas County, home of Toledo, all the way to Cuyahoga County, home of Cleveland. Brown also trounced Renacci in Franklin County and Hamilton County, home of Columbus and Cincinnati respectively; the latter, Hamilton County, was once considered a Republican stronghold. Renacci, while performing well in most rural areas of the state, underperformed Mike DeWine, the Republican Party's nominee and eventual winner for governor.

Regardless, Renacci somewhat overperformed in comparison to most polling before the election, while Brown lost in several counties he had won in his previous Senate races. In particular, Brown lost ground in Appalachia compared to his 2012 run, losing the Appalachian counties of Jefferson, Belmont, Monroe, Ross, Pike, and Scioto counties. This was in line with the region's shift towards the Republican Party, as evident by Obama's inability to win these counties in his 2012 bid for the presidency of the United States, Strickland's inability to win these counties in his 2016 bid for United States Senate (despite having previously represented Appalachia in the United States House of Representatives), and Clinton's underperformance in Appalachia in her 2016 bid for the presidency of the United States relative to previous Democrats. Exit polls also show Brown had a very strong showing among minority and women voters, which was key to his victory. Brown was sworn in for a third term as the senior senator from Ohio on January 3, 2019.
