= One Cleveland Center =

Skyscraper in Cleveland, Ohio

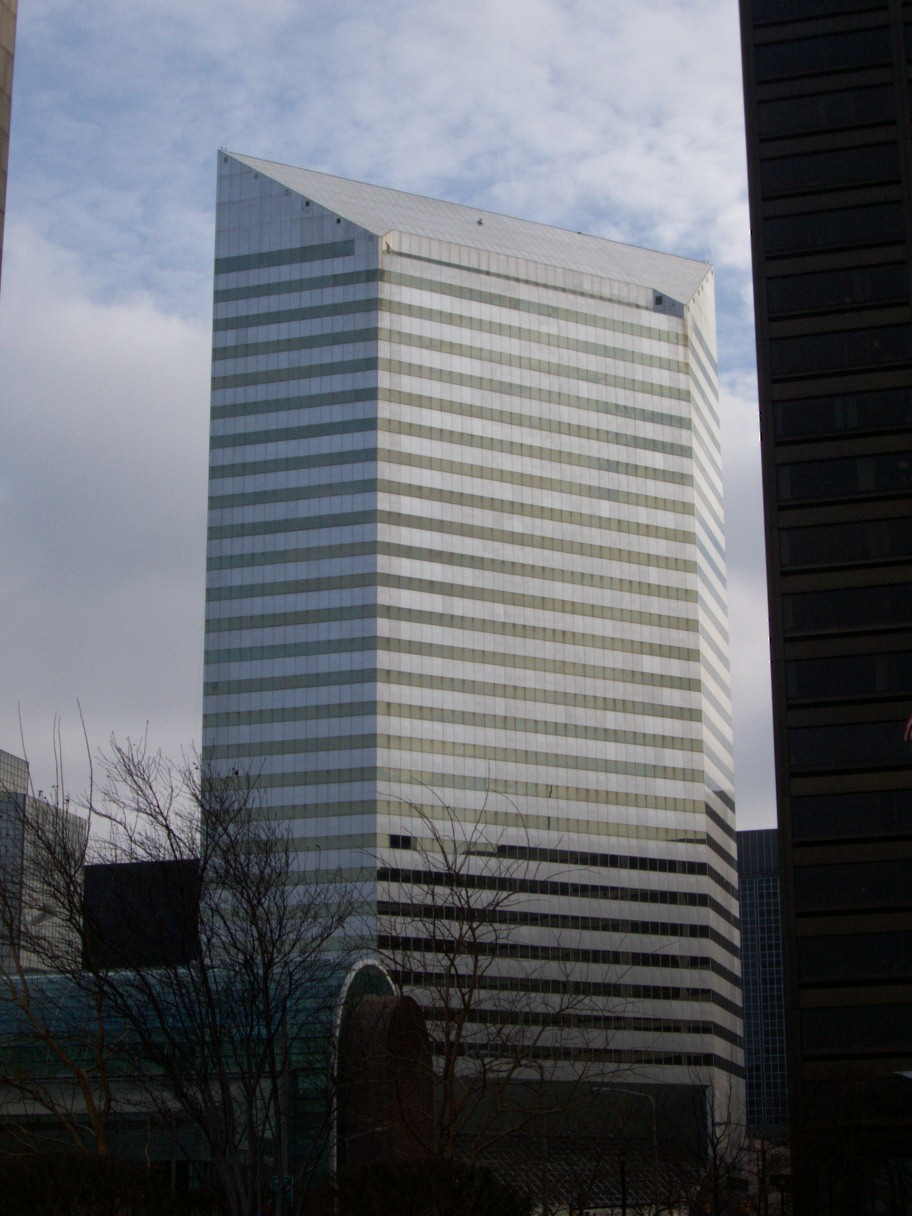
- One Cleveland Center

- Location within Ohio
- Alternative names: Medical Mutual Building

General information
- Status: Completed
- Type: Skyscraper
- Architectural style: Modernism
- Classification: Office
- Location: Downtown, 1375 East 9th Street, Cleveland, Ohio
- Coordinates: 41°30′13″N 81°41′21″W
- Groundbreaking: October 30, 1980
- Completed: 1983
- Renovated: 1995; 2011
- Cost: $52,100,000
- Owner: Optima Management Group

Height
- Height: 450.01 feet (137.16 m)

Technical details
- Floor count: 31
- Floor area: 19,200 square feet (1,780 m^{2})
- Grounds: 530,014 square feet (49,239.9 m^{2})

Design and construction
- Architecture firm: The Stubbins Associates, Inc.
- Developer: The Galbreath Company
- Structural engineer: LeMessurier Consultants
- Main contractor: Turner Construction

Renovating team
- Architects: Westlake Reed and Leskosky

Other information
- Number of restaurants: 1
- Parking: Garage - 1,100 spaces

Website
- www.optimamanagementgroup.com/property/one-cleveland-center/

One Cleveland Center is the sixth tallest skyscraper in downtown Cleveland, Ohio. The building has 31 stories, rises to a height of 450.01 feet (137.16 m), and is located at 1375 East 9th Street. It has about 530,014 square feet (49,239.9 m^{2}) of office space. It was purchased on May 15, 2008, for $86.3 million by Optima International LLC, a Miami-based real estate investment firm led by Chaim Schochet and 2/3rd owned by the Privat Group, one of Ukraine's largest business and banking groups.

== Design and history ==
Designed by KlingStubbins, One Cleveland Center has an angular, "silver chisel" design similar to that of New York City's Citigroup Center. The land the tower was built on was intended to be part of the I. M. Pei Erieview urban renewal plan. The site was cleared in 1963 but was not developed and was used as a parking lot. It was sold to Medical Mutual by John W. Galbreath in 1979 to develop a "people oriented" office building. Ground was broken on October 30, 1980, and construction was completed in 1983. The tower's base is structured into a five-story glass garden atrium. It also houses a fitness center on the top two floors of the contiguous parking structure, and a 400-seat conference center named the Cleveland Metropolitan Bar Association Conference Center.

One Cleveland Center also uses Citigroup Center-style diagonal trusses. During construction of One Cleveland Center, the trusses were added to make the One Cleveland Center more rigid and able to handle Cleveland's sometimes windy downtown conditions, especially in the winter months. One Cleveland Center also uses Citigroup Center-style skin. The Trusses can be seen at night when the building is lit up.

In 2003, CNBC reported from One Cleveland Center about an investment banker named Frank Gruttadauria. Gruttadauria worked for Lehman Brothers at their Cleveland Offices, which are based at One Cleveland Center. Gruttadauria was charged with embezzlement of investment funds from the Fazio family who at one time owned a Cleveland-area chain of grocery stores. He served some time in Federal jail until his release in 2009.

In 2020, Optima offices in One Cleveland Center were raided by the FBI as part of a probe into Privat Group principal Ihor Kolomoyskyi. Kolomoyskyi had reportedly refused to broker a meeting between Trump ally Rudy Giuliani and Ukrainian President Volodymyr Zelenskyy to find evidence that could be used against Democratic Presidential nominee Joe Biden in 2019.

== Renovations ==
In 2009, it was announced that the plaza and landscaping of One Cleveland Center were to be renovated. Construction began in August 2009 when crews demolished the original 1983 designed plaza. In addition to the outdoor plaza, the 1983 lobby was renovated with new flooring, a new canopy entrance, and amenities such as an LCD televisions and a news ticker in the lobby. Westlake Reed and Leskosky was the main architect for the renovation of the lobby.

== Tenants ==
- Bellwether Enterprise: Commercial Mortgage Banking
- Brown Gibbons Lang & Company
- Cleveland-Cuyahoga County Port Authority
- Cleveland Metropolitan Bar Association
- Grant Thornton LLP—Accounting Firm
- KPMG LLP—Accounting Firm
- Merrill-Investment Firm
- Sun Life Financial—Financial Services
- Whole Health Management Inc.(Walgreens Inc.)
- Cleveland Research Company

== See also ==
- List of tallest buildings in Cleveland
