= Brown Gibbons Lang & Company =

American investment banking firm

- Trade name: BGL
- Company type: Private
- Industry: Financial services
- Founded: September 1989; 36 years ago
- Founders: Kevin Brown; Michael Gibbons; Scott Lang
- Headquarters: One Cleveland Center, Cleveland, Ohio, United States
- Key people: Michael Gibbons (Senior managing director)
- Products: Investment banking
- Website: www.bglco.com

Brown Gibbons Lang & Company (BGL) is an American middle market investment bank that is headquartered in Cleveland, Ohio.

== History ==
In September 1989, Michael Gibbons started a private equity firm in Ohio with his friend Kevin Brown who was a wealthy architect. Just six weeks after founding it, Brown died in a powerboat racing accident during his pursuit of the world championship. Suddenly without a business partner or the capital provided by him, Gibbons had to quickly change strategy. As an experienced banker who previously worked at McDonald & Co., Gibbons started providing investment banking services to private and public corporations. Gibbons has stated he admired the partnership structure at McDonald & Co. and wanted to replicate that at BGL.

In 1995, BGL opened a second office in Chicago which has become the firm's largest office. Scott Lang was the founder of the new office and would become BGL's CEO until his departure in 2007.

In 2010 following the Great Recession, BGL management realized that M&A is very cyclical and therefore needed to diversify the business to fill in the gaps. As a result, BGL established a real estate investment banking group which handled projects such as the Pro Football Hall of Fame and the DoubleTree hotel in Youngstown.

In 2014, BGL moved its headquarters to One Cleveland Center.

BGL has since expanded into additional sectors such as industrials, environmental services, healthcare and consumer products. It has also opened additional offices across the United States including offices in Los Angeles and New York City in 2022.

== Notable deals ==
Gibbons has run as a Republican in the 2018 United States Senate election in Ohio and the 2022 United States Senate election in Ohio. During his run in 2022, The Cincinnati Enquirer reported that Gibbons held a $2.8 million stake in Lordstown Motors and later BGL advised it on a reverse merger with a special-purpose acquisition company (SPAC) named DiamondPeak Holdings to became listed on the NASDAQ stock exchange on October 23, 2020. The stock crash months later amid a federal investigation of exaggerated order claims to investors and concerns about business viability. Experts stated Gibbon's role was conflict of interest as he had incentive to make Lordstown Motors go public otherwise he could potentially be left holding illiquid private stock. Gibbons stated he believed there was no conflict of interest and downplayed his work with Lordstown Motors saying he acquired the stake during an earlier round of financing. He also stated he was out of the picture by the time Lordstown Motors decided to pursue the SPAC merger but this was contradicted by a Lordstown Motors SEC filing in late 2020 that stated it hired BGL to serve as its financial advisor regarding the SPAC merger.

Other notable deals BGL were involved in include the sale of Ben Venue Laboratories to Boehringer Ingelheim, the sale of Realty One to Insignia Financial Group and the redevelopment of the Glenn Research Center. In February 2026, BGL announced the sale of Velocity Maintenance Solutions (VMS), a Maintenance, Repair, and Overhaul services provider to Bombardier Inc. via its US subsidiary Learjet for an undisclosed sum.
