= 25 Park Place =

Georgia State University building

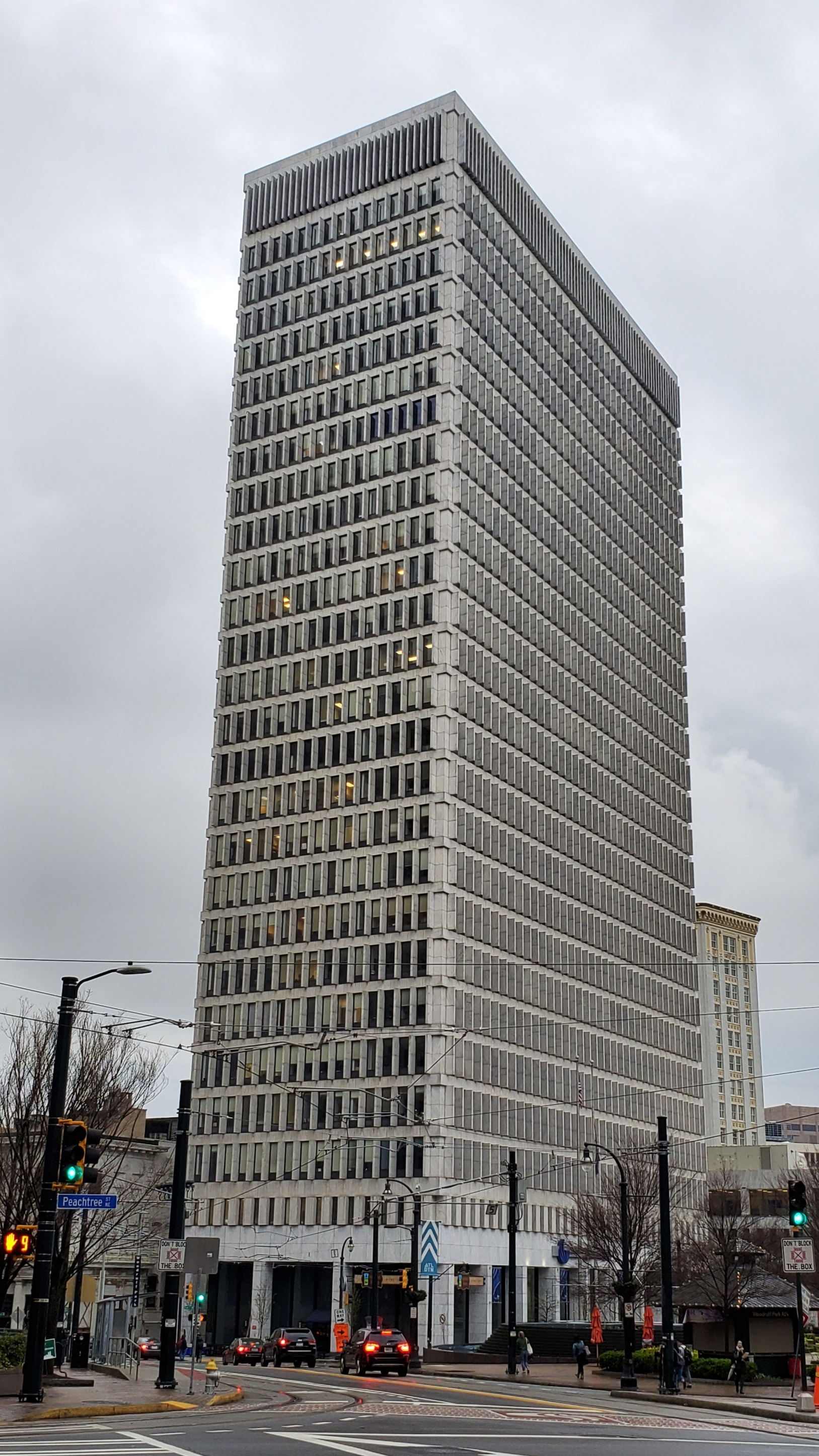
- 25 Park Place in 2020
- Alternative names: SunTrust Bank Building, Trust Company of Georgia Building

General information
- Type: university
- Location: 25 Park Place NE; Atlanta, Georgia
- Coordinates: 33.754711°N 84.388068°W
- Completed: 1971

Height
- Antenna spire: 115 m (377 ft)
- Roof: 115 m (377 ft)

Technical details
- Floor count: 28

Design and construction
- Architect(s): Carson, Lundin & Shaw

25 Park Place, formerly the Trust Company of Georgia Building and later the SunTrust Bank Building is a 115 m (377 ft) 28-story skyscraper owned by Georgia State University in Downtown Atlanta. Built across from Woodruff Park, construction was finished in 1971 as the headquarters for Trust Company of Georgia, which was bought by SunTrust in 1985. It was acquired by Georgia State University in 2007, and houses many departments in the College of Arts and Sciences. The building resembles a similar facade to that of the Landmark Building in Greenville, South Carolina.

== See also ==
- List of tallest buildings in Atlanta
