= Akron Digital Academy =

Blended-learning school district in Ohio

- Akron, OH

District information
- Established: 2002
- Closed: 2018
- Superintendent: David Bowlin
- Schools: 3
- Budget: $4.5 million in FY2013

Students and staff
- Students: 500
- Staff: 55

The Akron Digital Academy was a public, community school district in Akron, Ohio and its surrounding counties. The district includes two high schools and one middle school. There were approximately 500 students enrolled in blended learning school.

== Blended learning ==
Akron Digital offered a blended learning education model that is a combination of a traditional school model and an "online" school model. In a traditional setting, a student attends a school building five days a week while scheduled in various class periods throughout the day. An "online" school model is where a student works only from a computer, where all of the courses are offered through online curriculum.

== History ==
Akron Digital Academy was founded in 2002. Initially sponsored by Akron Public Schools, the district cut ties in 2013. It went out of business and closed in June 2018 due to strains on the school's budget from repayments to the state.
