= Strickland's Frozen Custard =

American ice cream chain

Strickland's Frozen Custard is an American ice cream chain, based in Akron, Ohio, with several locations in Ohio and one in Costa Mesa, California. The chain was founded in 1936 by Bill and Florence Strickland of Akron. Strickland's makes its ice cream fresh on-site daily, and generally serves only three or four flavors a day. Despite the chain's name, Strickland's product does not contain egg yolks, and so is legally not frozen custard. Rather, it is similar to soft-serve ice cream, but contains less air than typical soft-serve.

The original Strickland's is still operating, and is located at 1809 Triplett Boulevard in Akron, in the same location as when it opened in 1936.
