= Goodyear Silents =

The Goodyear Silents were a semi-professional football team based in Akron, Ohio, composed of deaf players. Most, if not all, of the team worked for the Goodyear Tire & Rubber Company.

During World Wars I and II, many industrial companies hired deaf people, including Goodyear and Firestone in Akron. In existence from 1915–1927, the team played against local and regional semi-pro teams, and compiled an all-time record of 68–35–11. In the process, they won several league championships.

The most disappointing moments the successful team experienced was their failure to defeat cross-town archrivals Akron Pros, losing all four games to this team. The Akron Pros was one of the pioneering teams in the fledgling National Football League (NFL). The four losing scores were: 9–0, 20–7, 6–0 and 14–0.

Joe Allen, one of the Goodyear Silents players, was the only one to continue his career in semi pro football after the team went out of business.
