= Police car =

Ground vehicle used by police for transportation

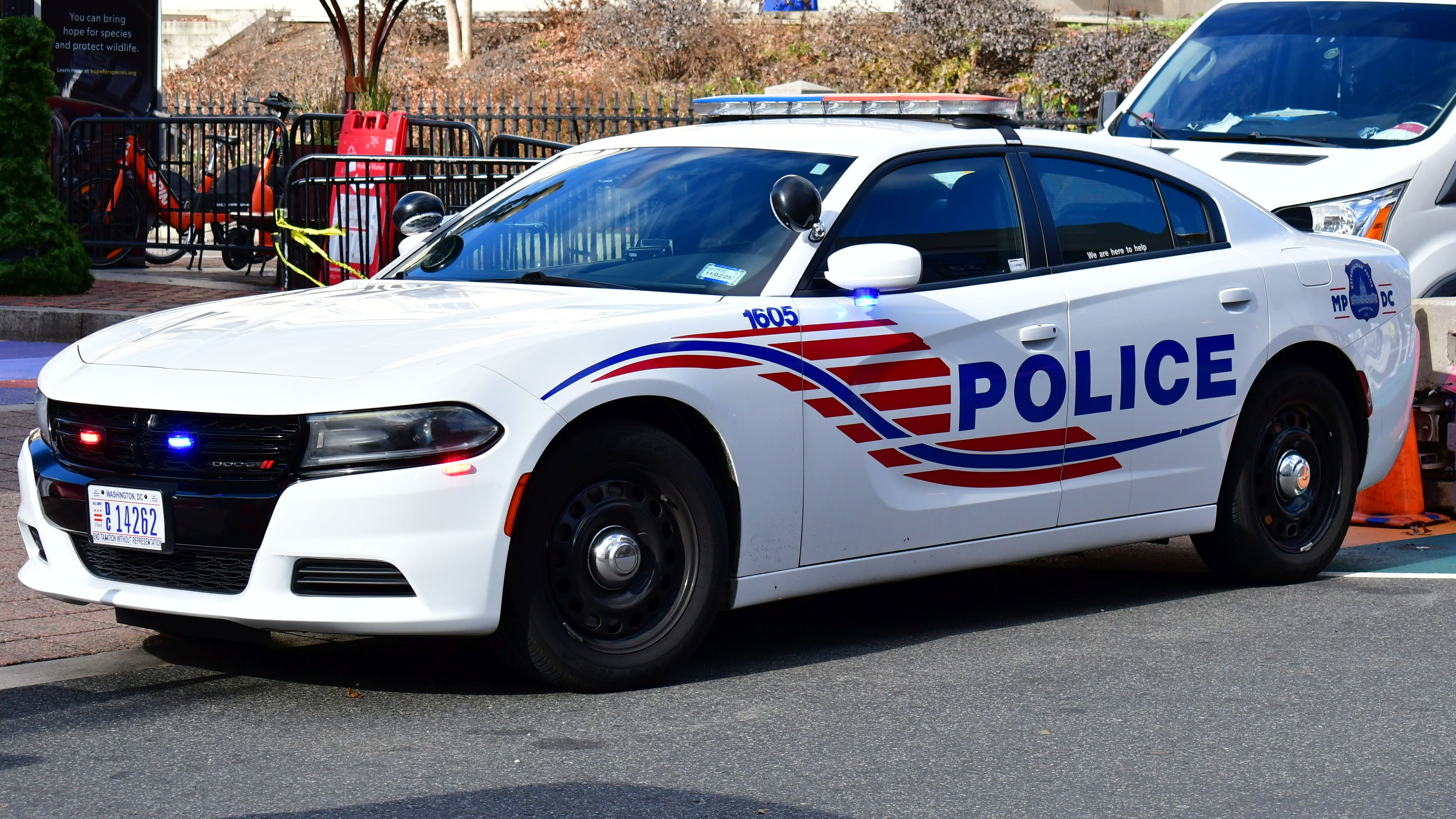
Dodge Charger Pursuit used by the Metropolitan Police Department of the District of Columbia

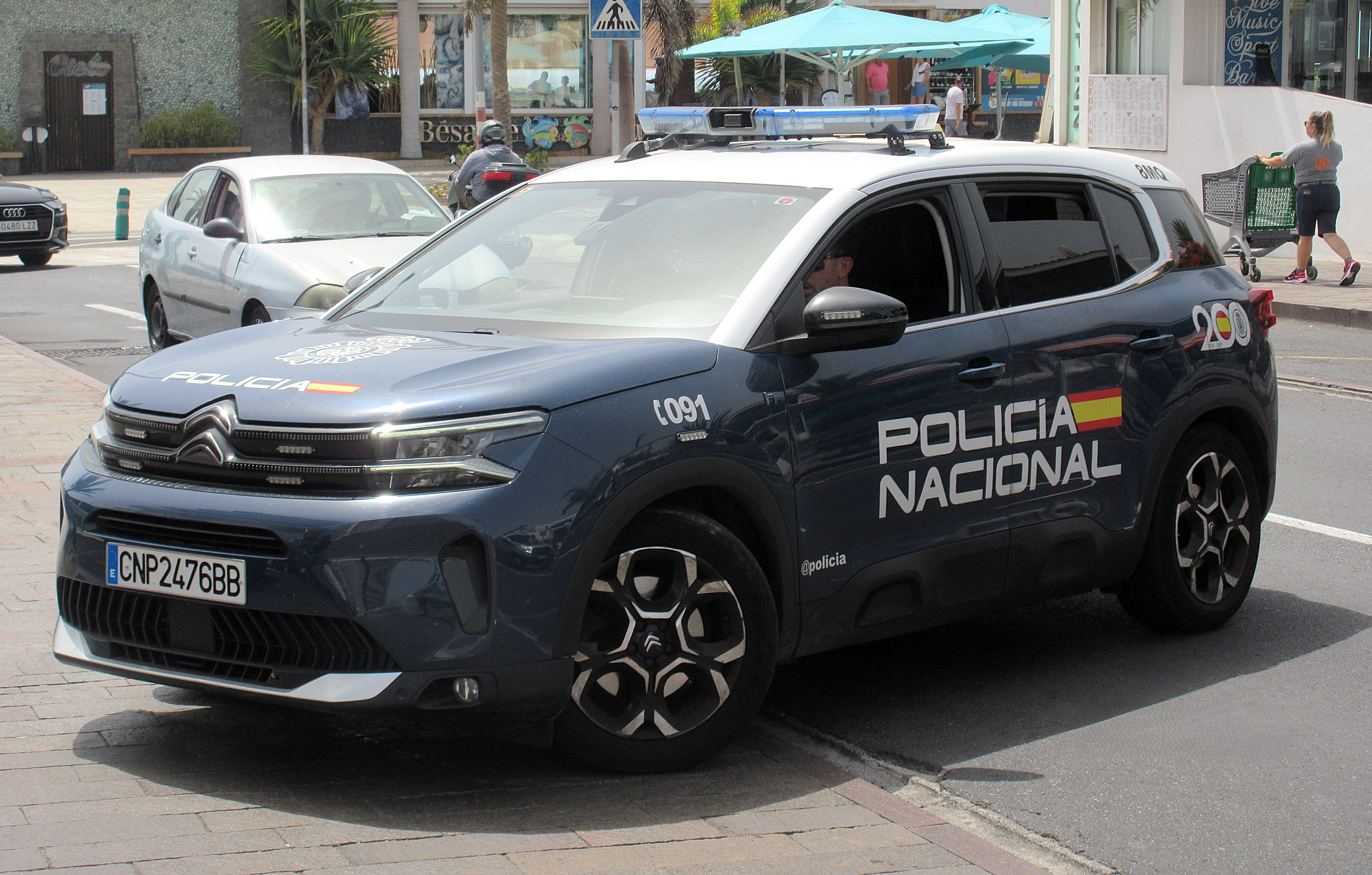
Citroën C5 Aircross used by the Spanish National Police Corps

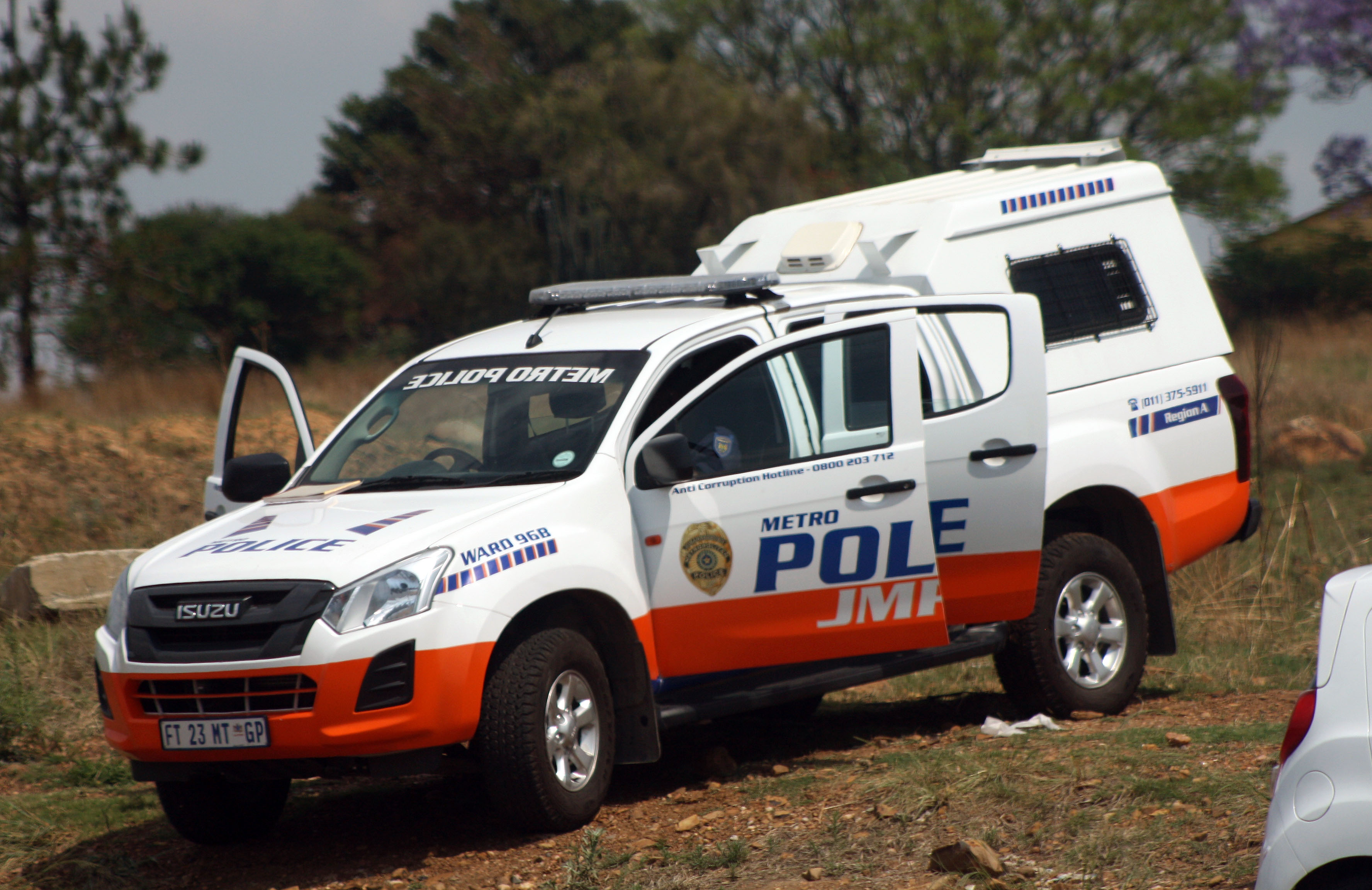
Isuzu KB used by the Johannesburg Metro Police

Hyundai police car used by the South Korean national police

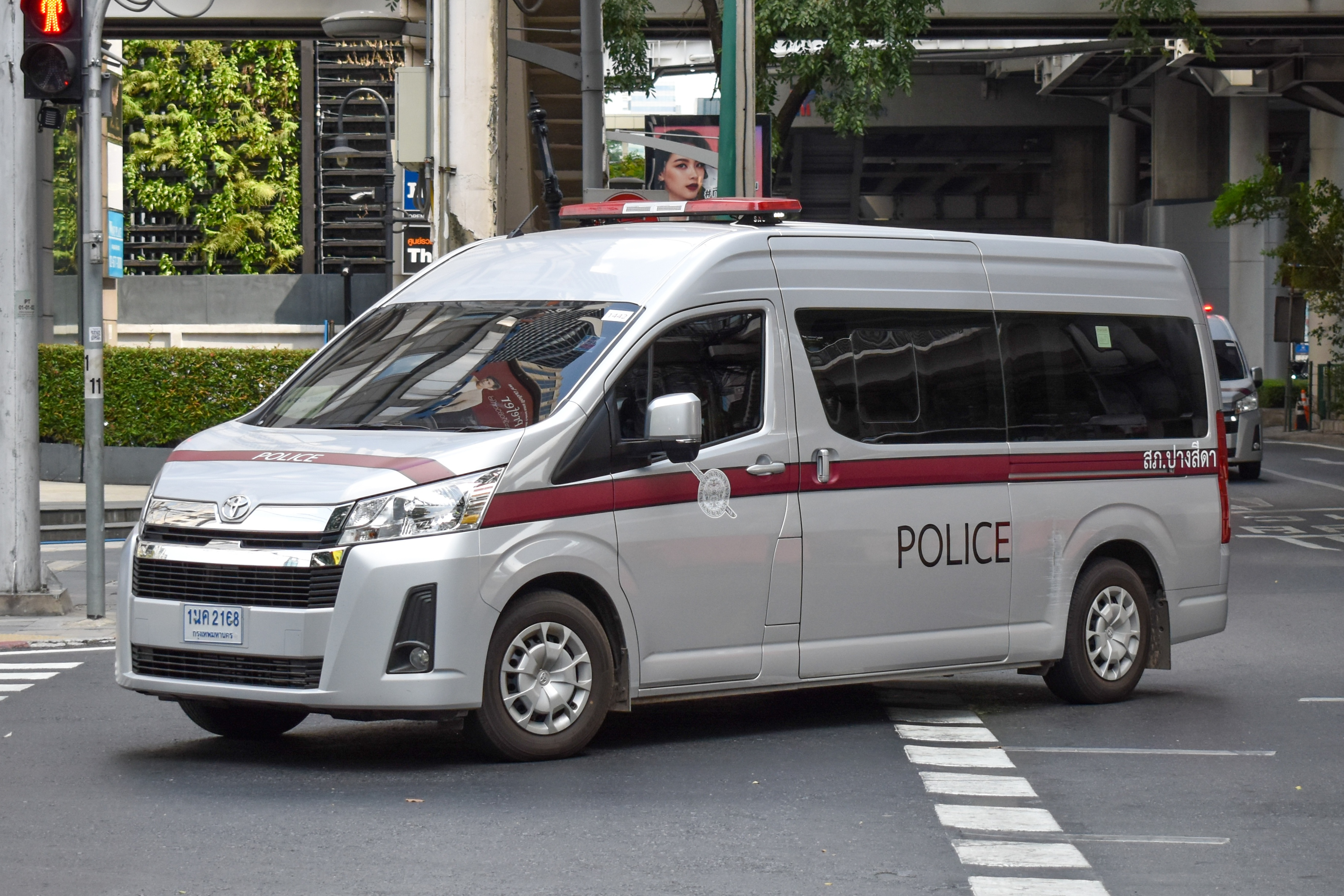
Toyota HiAce used by the Royal Thai Police

A police car is an emergency vehicle used by police for transportation during patrols and responses to calls for service. Police cars are used by police officers to patrol a beat, quickly reach incident scenes, and transport and temporarily detain suspects.

Police vehicles, like other emergency vehicles, usually bear livery markings to distinguish them as such. They generally use emergency lights (typically red, blue, or both) and sirens to warn other motorists of their presence, especially when responding to calls for service. Police cars typically contain communication devices, weaponry, and a variety of equipment for dealing with emergency situations. The vast majority of police cars are modified variants of civilian-market automobiles, though some are custom police-oriented models that are usually designed for special purposes.

== History ==
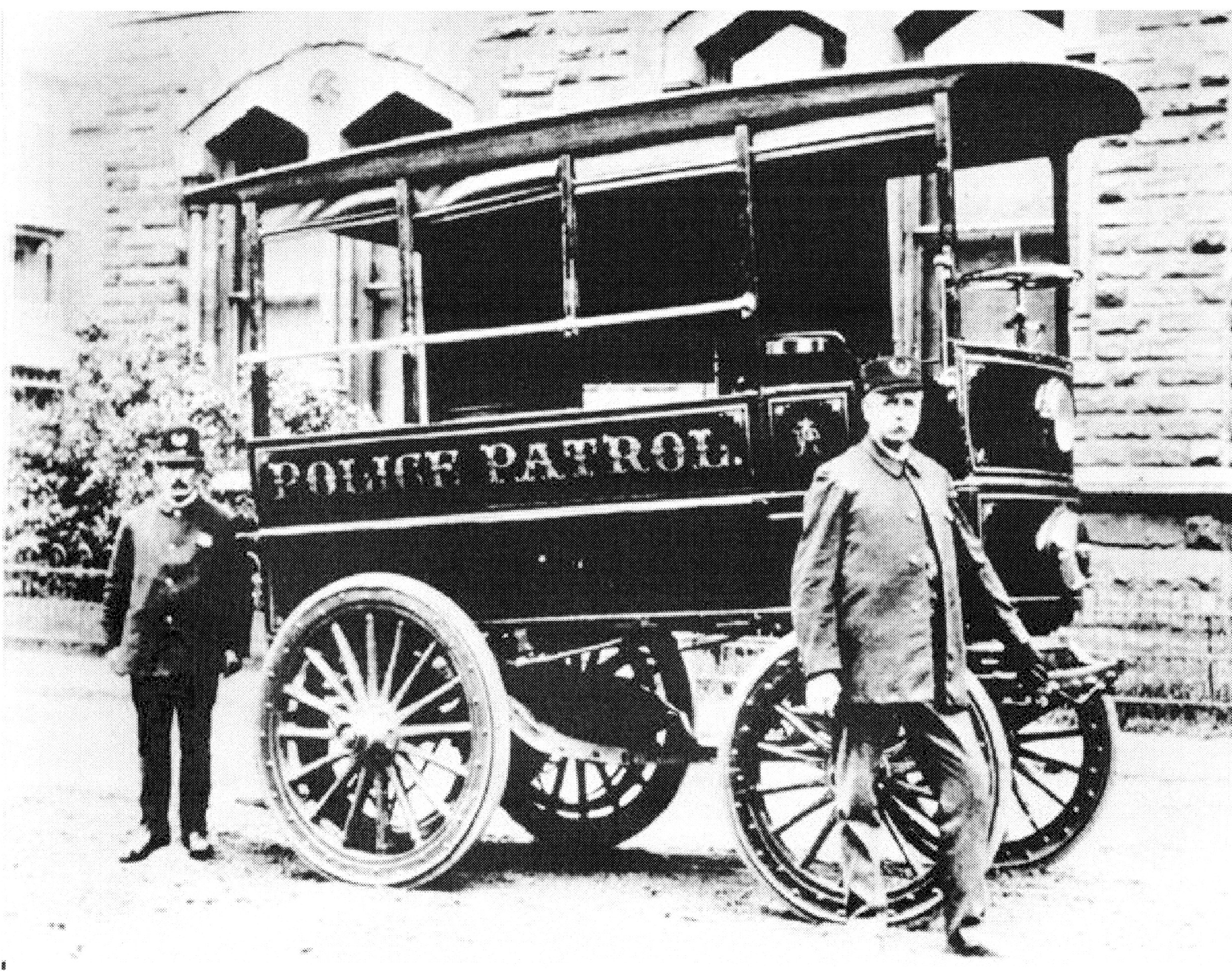
The Akron Police Department's patrol wagon in 1899

The first police car was an electric wagon used by the Akron Police Department in Akron, Ohio, in 1899. The first operator of the police patrol wagon was Officer Louis Mueller, Sr. It could reach 16 mph (26 km/h) and travel 30 mi (48 km) before its battery needed to be recharged. The car was designed by city mechanical engineer Frank Loomis. The US$2,400 vehicle was equipped with electric lights, gongs, and a stretcher. The car's first assignment was to pick up a drunken man at the junction of Main and Exchange streets.

Ford introduced the flathead V8 in the 1932 Ford as the first mass-marketed V8 car; this low-priced, mass-marketed V8 car became popular with police in the United States, establishing strong brand loyalty that continued into the 21st century. Starting in the 1940s, major American automakers, namely the Big Three, began to manufacture specialized police cars. Over time, these became their own dedicated police fleet offerings, such as the Ford Police Interceptor and Chevrolet 9C1.

In the United Kingdom, Captain Athelstan Popkess, Chief Constable of the Nottingham City Police from 1930 to 1959, transformed British police from their Victorian era foot patrol beat model to the modern car-based reactive response model, through his development of the "Mechanised Division", which used two-way radio communication between police command and police cars. Under Popkess, the Nottingham City Police began to use police cars as an asset that police tactics centred around, such as overlaying police car patrol sectors over foot patrol beats and using police cars to pick up foot patrol officers while responding to crimes.

Increased car ownership in the post-World War II economic expansion led to police cars becoming significantly more common in most developed countries, as police jurisdictions expanded farther out into residential and suburban areas, car-oriented urban planning and highways dominated cities particularly in North America, vehicular crimes and police evasion in cars increased, and more equipment was issued to police officers, to the point that vehicles became practically necessary for modern law enforcement.

== Types ==
Various types of police cars exist. Depending on the organization of the law enforcement agency, the class of vehicle used as a police car, country, and the environmental factors of the agency's jurisdiction, many of the types below may or may not exist in certain fleets, or their capabilities may be merged to create all-rounded units with shared vehicles as opposed to specialized units with separate vehicles.

=== Patrol car ===
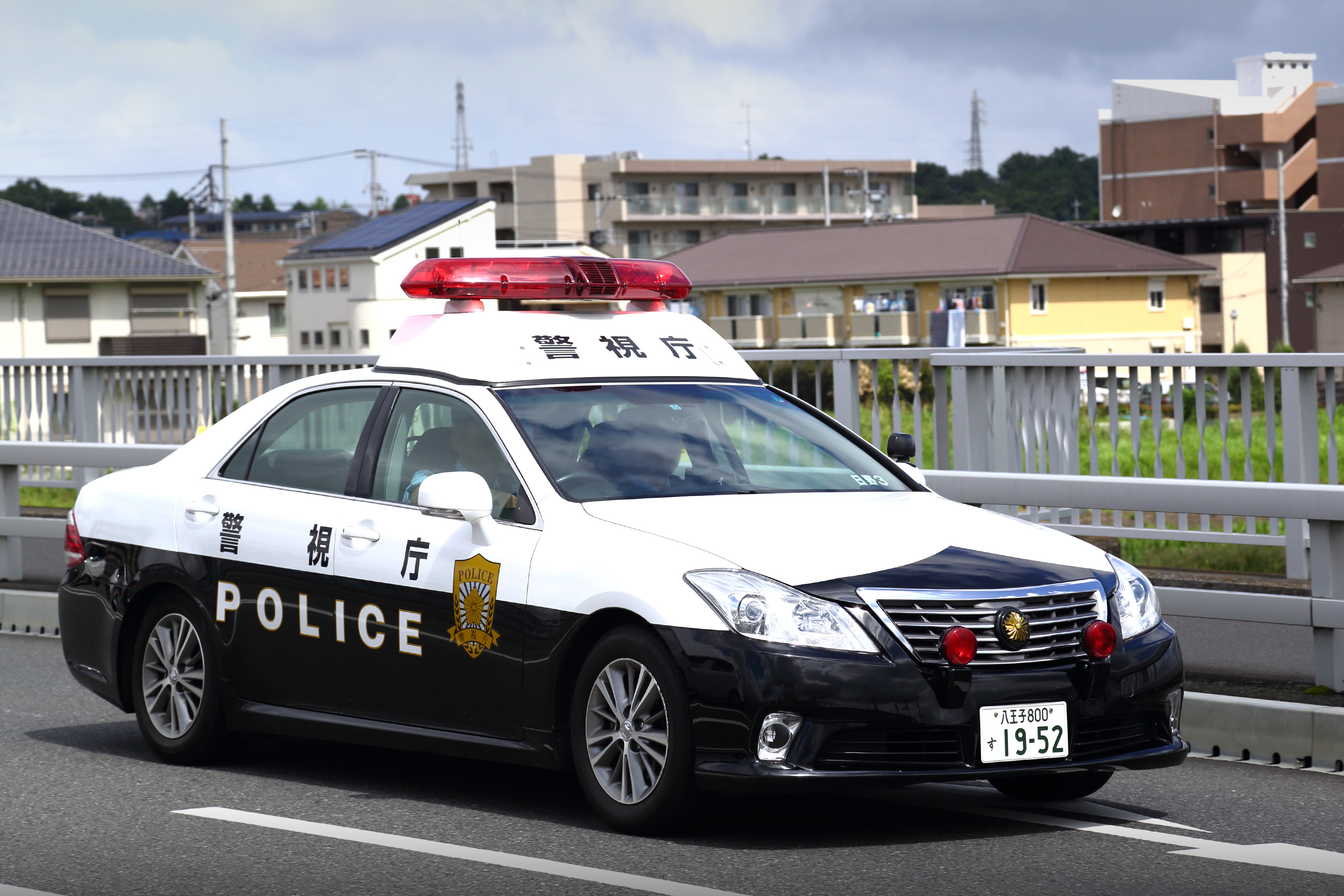
Toyota Crown black and white patrol car used by the Tokyo Metropolitan Police Department

A patrol car, also called a black-and-white police vehicle, or marked patrol car is a police car used for standard patrol. Used to replace traditional foot patrols, the patrol car's primary function is to provide transportation for regular police duties, such as responding to calls, enforcing laws, or simply establishing a more visible police presence while on patrol. Driving a patrol car allows officers to reach their destinations more quickly and to cover more ground compared to other methods. Patrol cars are typically designed to be identifiable as police cars to the public and thus almost always have proper markings, roof-mounted emergency lights, and sirens.

=== Traffic car ===
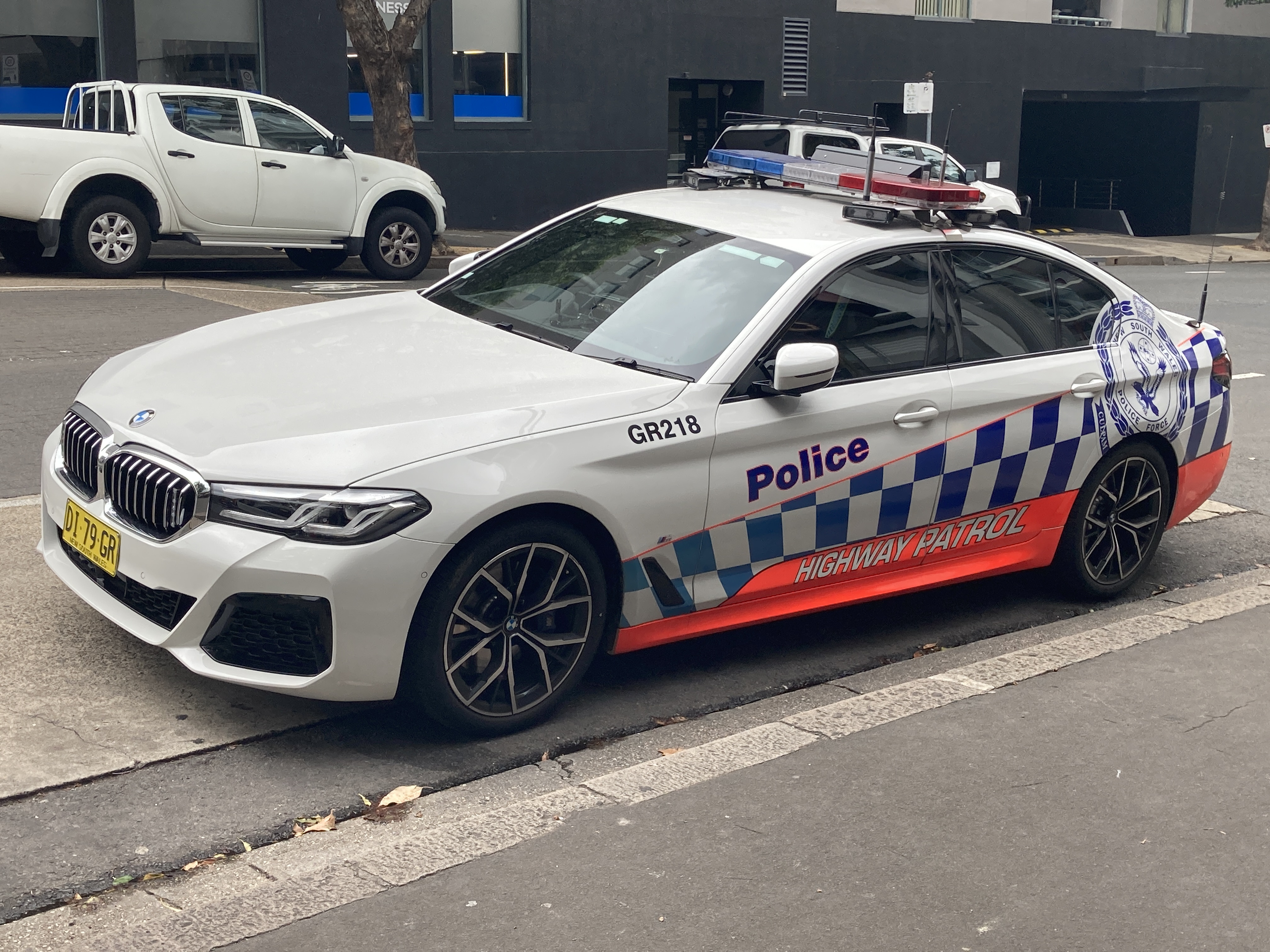
BMW 5 Series highway patrol car used by the New South Wales Police Force

A traffic car, also called a highway patrol car, traffic enforcement unit, speed enforcement unit, or road policing unit, is a police car tasked with enforcing traffic laws and conducting traffic stops, typically on major roadways such as highways. They are often relatively high-performance vehicles compared to patrol cars, as they must be capable of catching up to fast-moving vehicles. They may have specific markings or special emergency lights to either improve or hinder visibility. Alternatively, some traffic cars may use the same models as patrol cars, and may barely differ from them aside from markings, radar speed guns, and traffic-oriented equipment.

=== Unmarked car ===
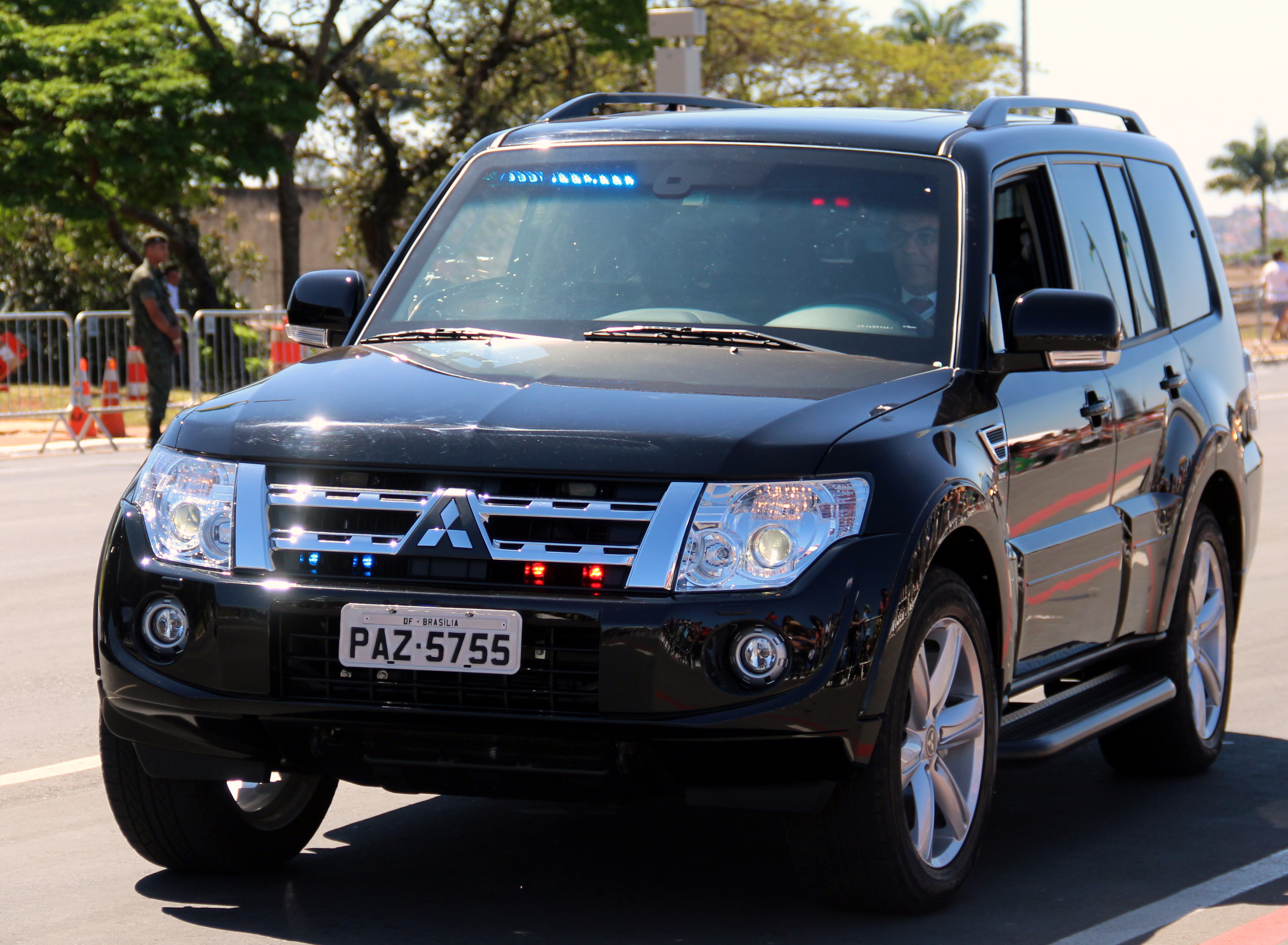
An unmarked Mitsubishi Pajero with its emergency lights on, used by the Federal Police of Brazil

An unmarked car is a police car that lacks markings and easily visible or roof-mounted emergency lights. They are generally used for varying purposes, ranging from standard patrol and traffic enforcement to federal agent and detective work. They have the advantage of not being immediately recognizable, and are considered a valuable tool in catching suspects in the commission of a crime or by surprise. The resemblance an unmarked police car has to a civilian car varies based on their application: they may use the same models as marked patrol cars, and may be virtually identical to them aside from the lack of a livery and roof-mounted emergency lights; alternatively, they may use common civilian vehicle models that blend in with traffic, with emergency lights embedded in the grille or capable of being hidden and revealed, such as Japanese unmarked cars having retractable beacons built into the car's roof.

Unmarked cars typically use regular civilian license plates, occasionally even in jurisdictions where emergency vehicles and government vehicles use unique license plates, though some agencies or jurisdictions may be able to use the unique plates anyway; for example, American federal law enforcement agencies may use either government plates or regular license plates.

The term "undercover car" is often used to describe unmarked cars. However, this usage is erroneous: unmarked cars are police cars that lack markings but have police equipment, emergency lights, and sirens, while undercover cars lack these entirely and are essentially civilian vehicles used by law enforcement in undercover operations to avoid detection.

The close resemblance of unmarked cars to civilian cars has created concerns of police impersonation. Some police officers advise motorists that they do not have to pull over in a secluded location and instead can wait until they reach somewhere safer. In the UK, officers must be wearing uniforms in order to make traffic stops. Motorists can also ask for the officer's badge (warrant card in the UK) and identification or call an emergency number or a police non-emergency number to confirm if the police unit is genuine.

==== Ghost car ====
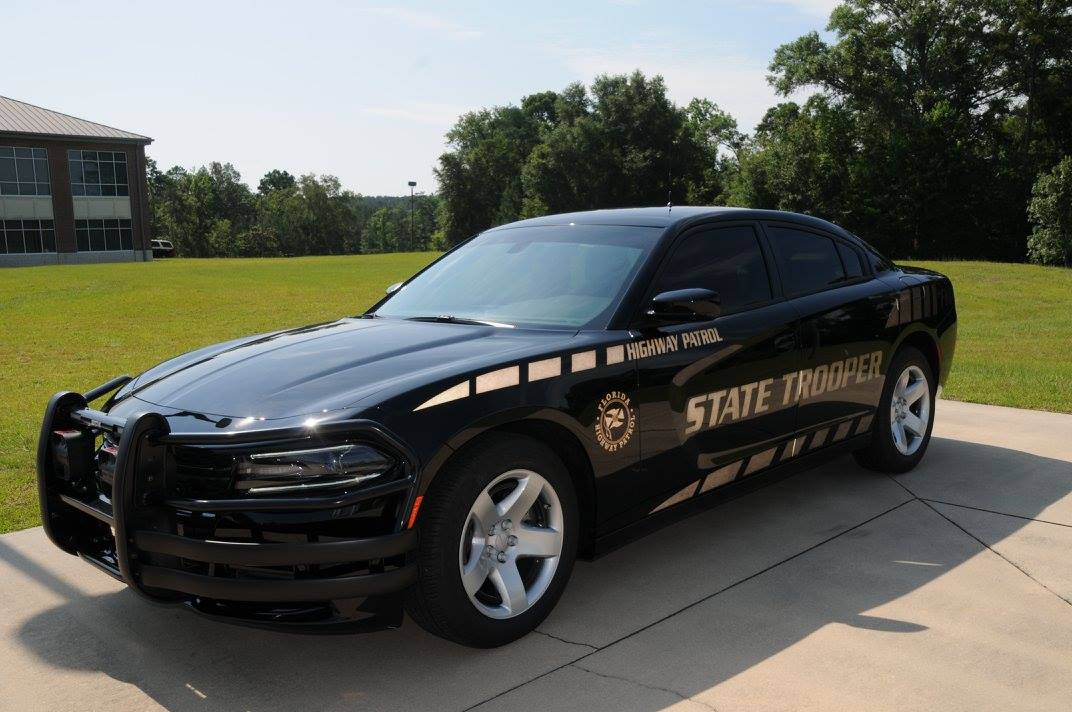
Dodge Charger Pursuit used as a ghost car by the Florida Highway Patrol. The white markings have been made visible by a light shined on them at an angle; otherwise, they are almost the same color as the vehicle itself, as seen near the rear.

A ghost car, also called a stealth car or semi-marked car, is a police car that combines elements of both an unmarked car and a marked patrol car, featuring markings that are either similar colors to the vehicle's body paint, or are reflective graphics that are difficult to see unless illuminated by lights or viewed at certain angles. Ghost cars are often used for traffic enforcement, though they may also be used in lieu of unmarked cars in jurisdictions where they are prohibited or have their enforcement capabilities limited, such as being unable to conduct traffic stops. In these cases, the markings on ghost cars may be sufficient to legally count as marked police cars, despite the markings being difficult to see.

=== Utility vehicle ===
A utility vehicle is a police car used for utility or support purposes as opposed to regular police duties. Utility vehicles are usually all-wheel drive vehicles with cargo space such as SUVs, pickup trucks, vans, utes, or off-road vehicles. They are often used to transport or tow assets such as trailers, equipment, or other vehicles such as police boats; they are alternatively used for or are capable of off-roading, especially in fleets where most other vehicles cannot do so. They can also be used for animal control, if that is the responsibility of police within that jurisdiction. Some utility vehicles can be used for transporting teams of officers and occasionally have facilities to securely detain and transport a small number of suspects, provided there is enough seating space.

=== Police dog vehicle ===
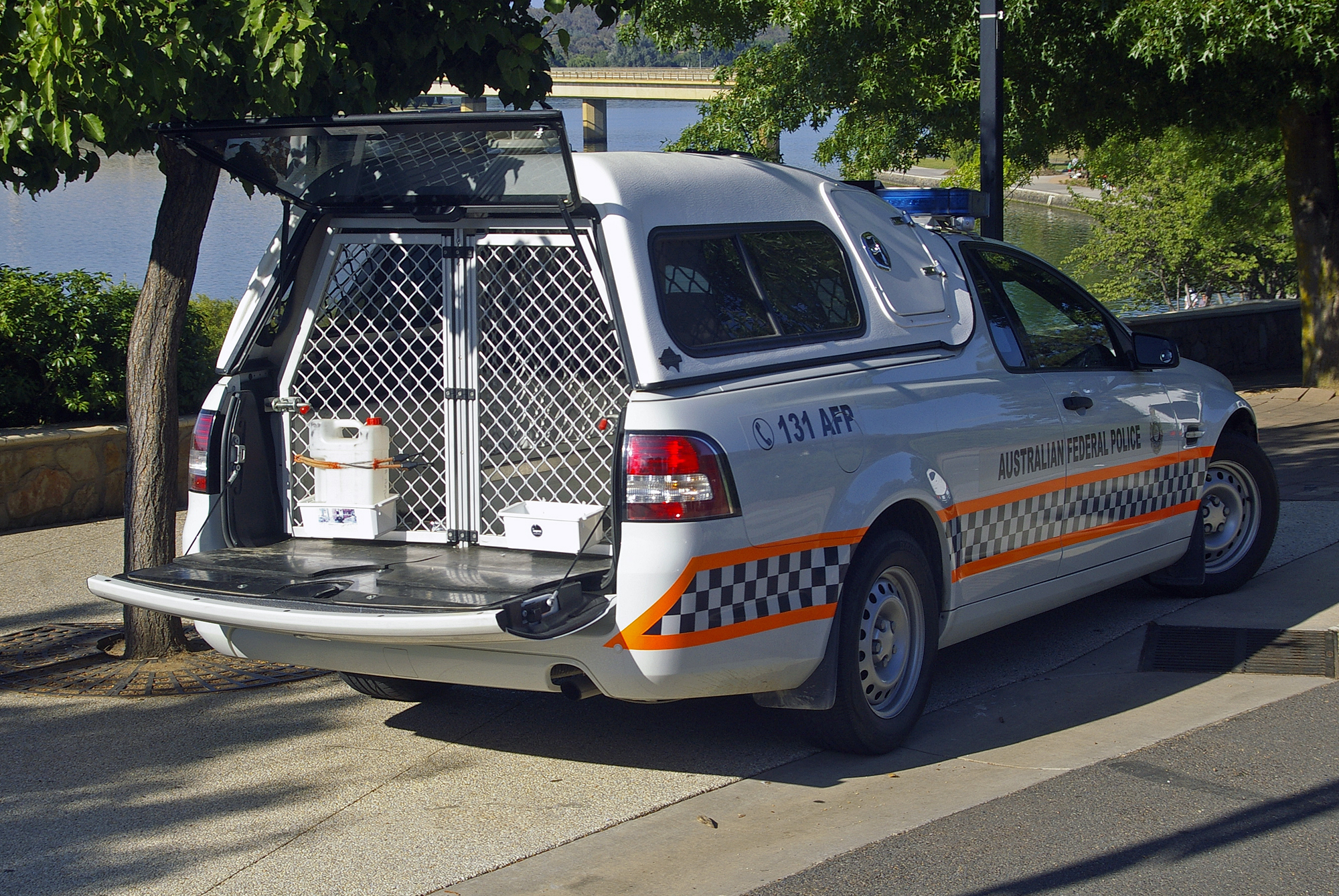
Holden Ute police dog vehicle used by the Australian Federal Police

A police dog vehicle, also called a K-9 vehicle or police dog unit, is a police car modified to transport police dogs. The models used for these vehicles range from the same as patrol cars to dedicated SUVs, pickup trucks, or vans. To provide sufficient space for the police dog, there is usually a cage in the trunk or rear seats with enough space for the dog, though some agencies may put the cage in the front passenger seat, or may lack a dedicated cage entirely and simply have the dog in the rear compartment. There may or may not be space to transport detainees or additional officers. Police dog vehicles almost always have markings noting they have a police dog on board, typically just the agency's standard markings with the added notice.

=== Decoy car ===
A decoy car is a police car used to establish a police presence, typically to deter traffic violations or speeding, without a police officer actually being present. They may be older models retired from use, civilian cars modified to resemble police cars, or demonstration vehicles. In some instances, a "decoy car" may not be a vehicle at all, but rather a life-sized cutout or sign depicting a police car. The use of decoy cars is intended to provide a visible deterrent against crime without having to commit manpower, allowing the officer that would otherwise be there to be freed up for other assignments.

In the United Kingdom, decoy liveried police cars and vans may be parked on filling station forecourts to deter motorists dispensing fuel then making off without payment, also known as "bilking".

The use of decoy cars is entirely up to the agency, though in 2005, the Virginia General Assembly considered a bill that would make decoy cars a legal requirement for police. The bill stated in part: "Whenever any law-enforcement vehicle is permanently taken out of service ... such vehicle shall be placed at a conspicuous location within a highway median in order to deter violations of motor vehicle laws at that location. Such vehicles shall ... be rotated from one location to another as needed to maintain their deterrent effect."

=== Surveillance car ===
A surveillance car is a police vehicle used for surveillance purposes. Usually SUVs, vans, or trucks, surveillance cars can be marked, unmarked, undercover, or disguised, and may be crewed or remotely monitored. They are used to gather evidence of criminal offenses or provide better vantage points at events or high-traffic areas. The surveillance method used varies, and may include CCTV, hidden cameras, wiretapping devices, or even aerial platforms. Some surveillance cars may also be used as bait cars, deployed to catch car thieves.

=== Armored vehicle ===
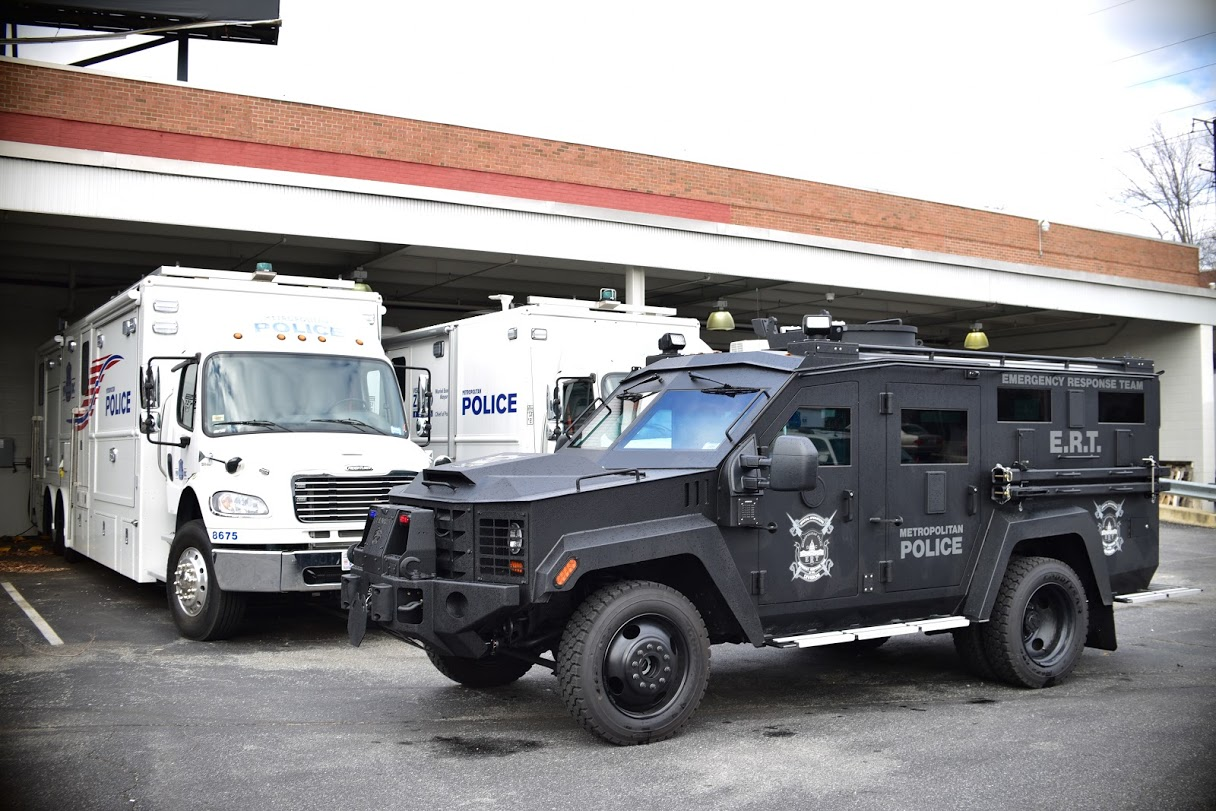
Lenco BearCat armored vehicle and Freightliner mobile command centers used by the Metropolitan Police Department of the District of Columbia

A police armored vehicle, also called a SWAT vehicle, tactical vehicle, or rescue vehicle, is an armored vehicle used in a police capacity. They are typically four-wheeled armored vehicles with similar configurations to military light utility vehicles, infantry mobility vehicles, internal security vehicles, MRAPs, or similar armored personnel carriers, that lack mounted and installed weaponry. As their name suggests, they are typically used to transport police tactical units such as SWAT teams, though they may also be used in riot control or to establish police presence at events.

=== Mobile command center ===
A mobile command center, also called an emergency operations center, mobile command post, or mobile police station, is a truck used to provide a central command center at the scene of an incident, or to establish a visible police presence or temporary police station at an event.

=== Bomb disposal vehicle ===
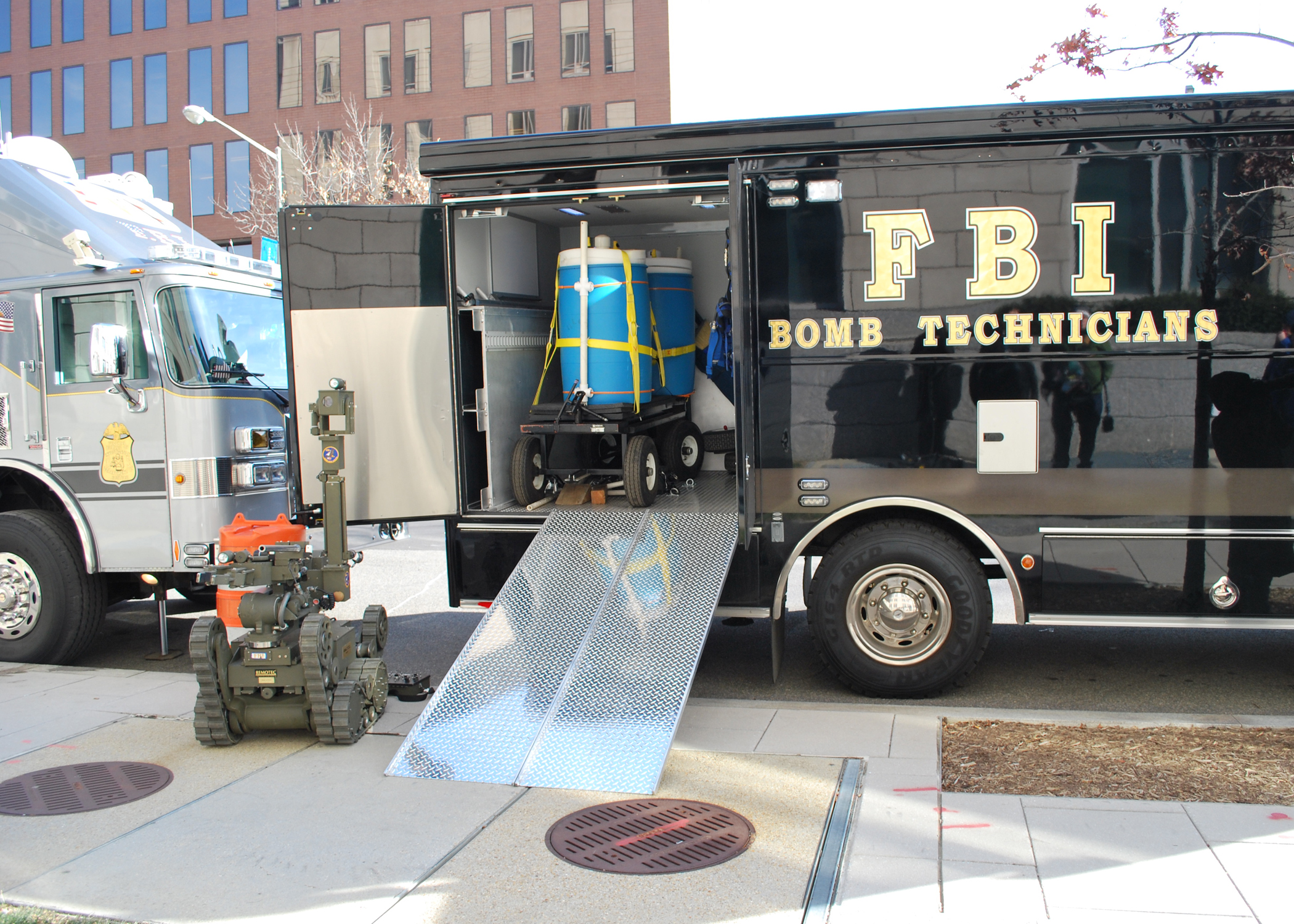
A bomb disposal vehicle used by the Federal Bureau of Investigation

A bomb disposal vehicle is a vehicle used by bomb disposal squads to transport equipment such as bomb disposal robots, or to store bombs for later disposal. They are often vans or trucks, typically with at least one bomb containment chamber installed in the rear of the vehicle, and ramps to allow bomb disposal robots to access the vehicle. Bomb disposal vehicles are generally not explosive-resistant and are only used for transporting explosives for disposal, not actively disposing of them.

=== Armed vehicle ===
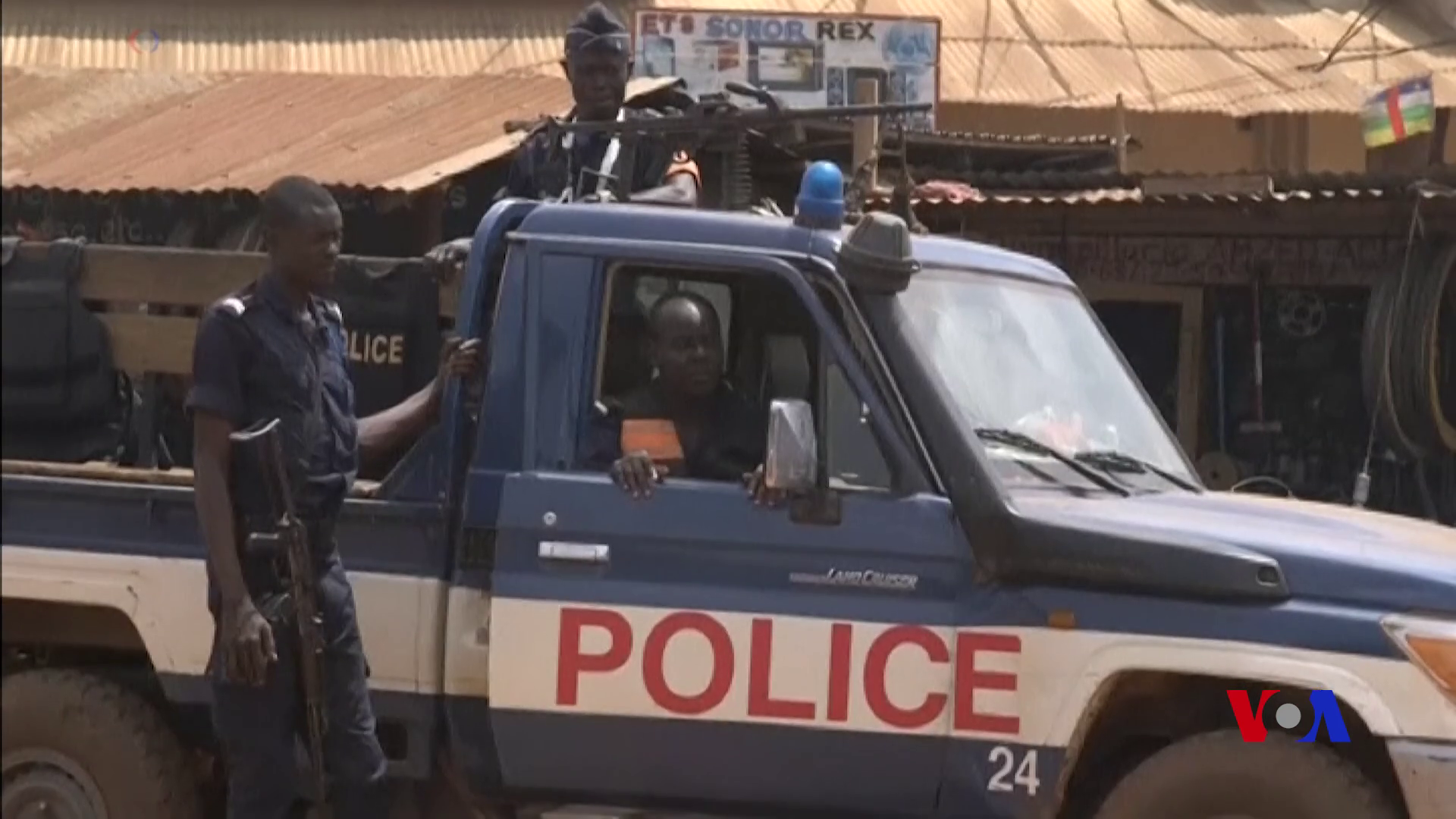
Toyota Land Cruiser technical used by the Central African Republic Police

An armed police vehicle is a police vehicle that has lethal weaponry installed on it. These are often technicals or light utility vehicles with machine gun turrets, and may or may not lack emergency lights and sirens. Armed police vehicles are very rare and are usually only used in wartime, in regions with very high violent crime rates, or where combat with organized crime or insurgencies is common to the point that armed police vehicles are necessary; for example, the Iraqi Police received technicals during the Iraq War, and the National Police of Ukraine used armed vehicles during the 2022 Russian invasion of Ukraine, including the STREIT Group Spartan and a modified BMW 6 Series with a mounted machine gun.

These should not be confused with police vehicles that have turrets but do not have guns, which are often just police armored vehicles or, if less-lethal munitions are used, riot control vehicles.

=== Riot control vehicle ===
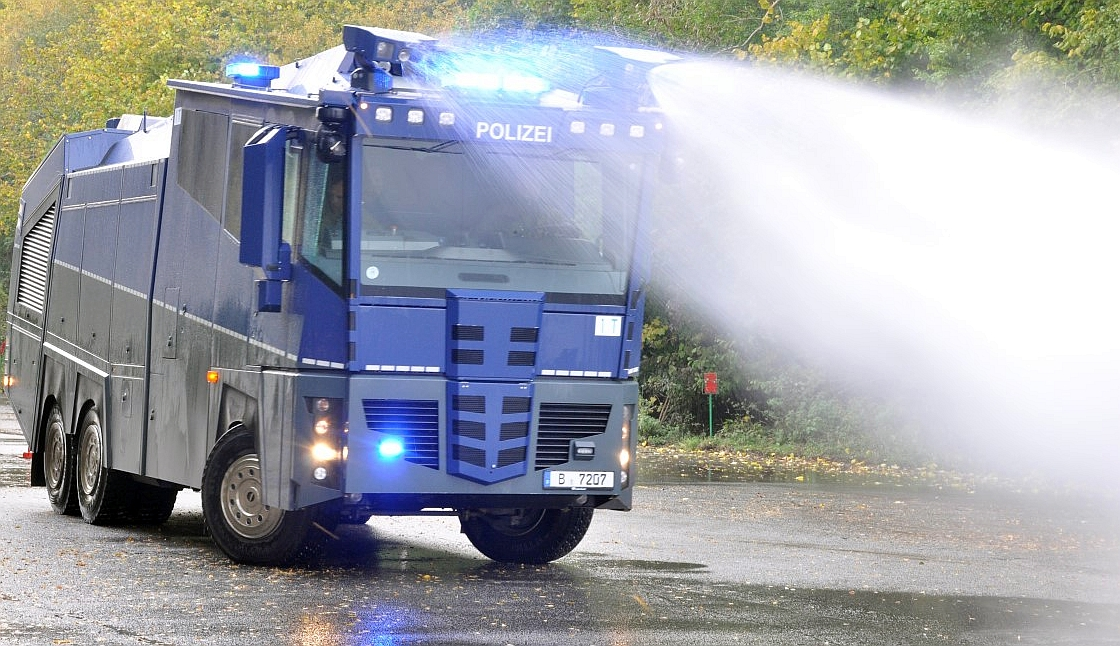
Wasserwerfer 10000 water cannon used by the Berlin Police Bereitschaftspolizei

A riot control vehicle, also called a riot suppression vehicle or simply a riot vehicle, is an armored or reinforced police vehicle used for riot control. A wide array of vehicles, from armored SUVs and vans to dedicated trucks and armored personnel carriers, are used by law enforcement to suppress or intimidate riots, protests, and public order crimes; hold and reinforce a police barricade to keep the scene contained; or simply transport officers and equipment at the scene in a manner safer than what could be achieved with a standard police car.

Common modifications include tear gas launchers, shields, and caged windows. Some riot control vehicles also include less-lethal weaponry and devices, such as water cannons and long-range acoustic devices.

=== Community engagement, liaison, and demonstration vehicles ===
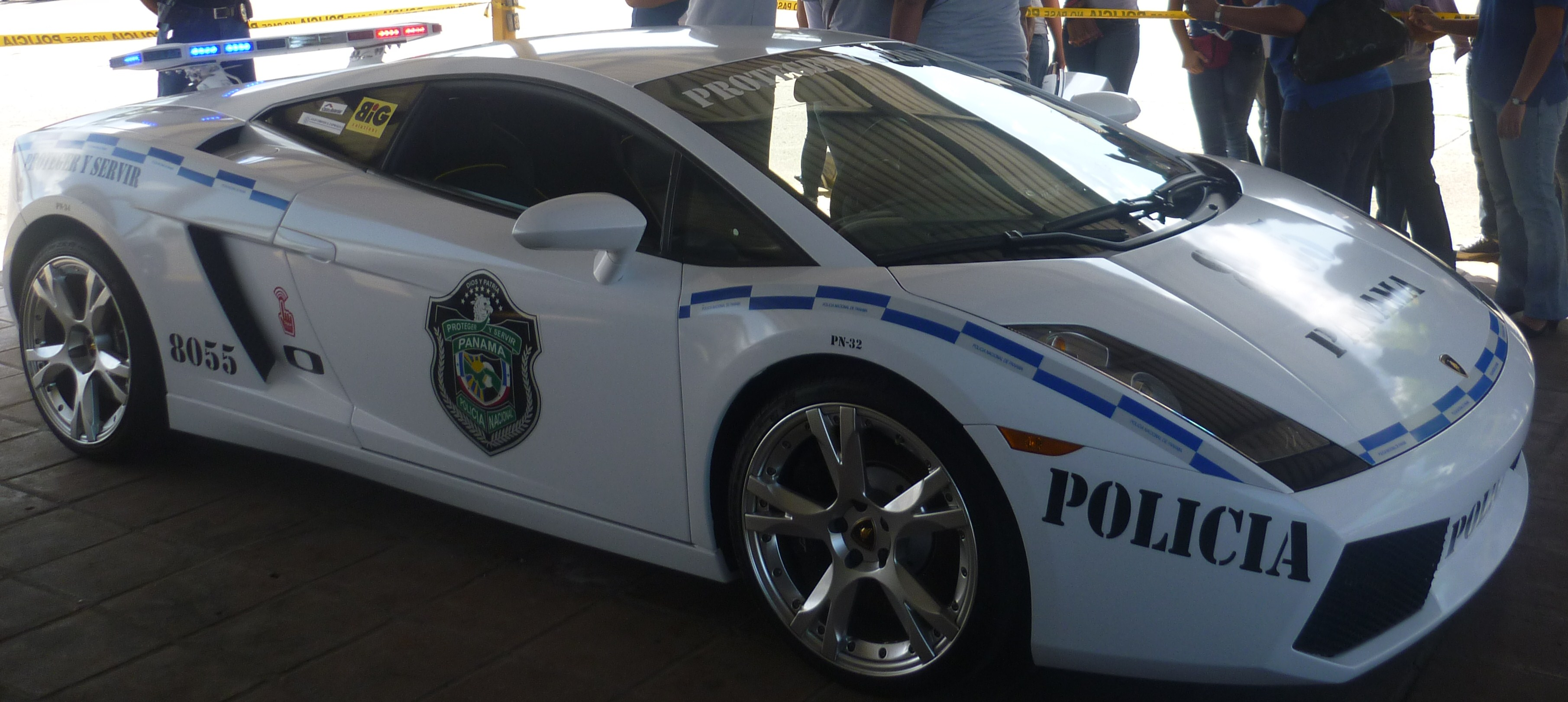
Lamborghini Gallardo used by the National Police of Panama to encourage recruitment

A community engagement vehicle, also known as a liaison vehicle, demonstration vehicle, or parade car depending on its use, is a police car used for display and community policing purposes, but not for patrol duties. These are often performance cars, modified cars, classic police cars, or vehicles seized from convicted criminals and converted to police cars, that are used to represent the agency in parades, promote a specific program (such as the D.A.R.E. program), or help build connections between law enforcement and those that the vehicle appeals to.

Some cars can be visibly marked but not fitted with audio or visual warning devices. These are often used by community liaison officers, administrative staff, or high-ranking officers for transport to meetings, engagements, and community events.

Some vehicles are produced by automotive manufacturers with police markings to showcase them to police departments; these are usually concepts, prototypes, or reveals of their police fleet offerings. Emergency vehicle equipment manufacturers such as Federal Signal, Whelen, and Code 3 also use unofficial police cars to demonstrate their emergency vehicle equipment.

== Equipment ==
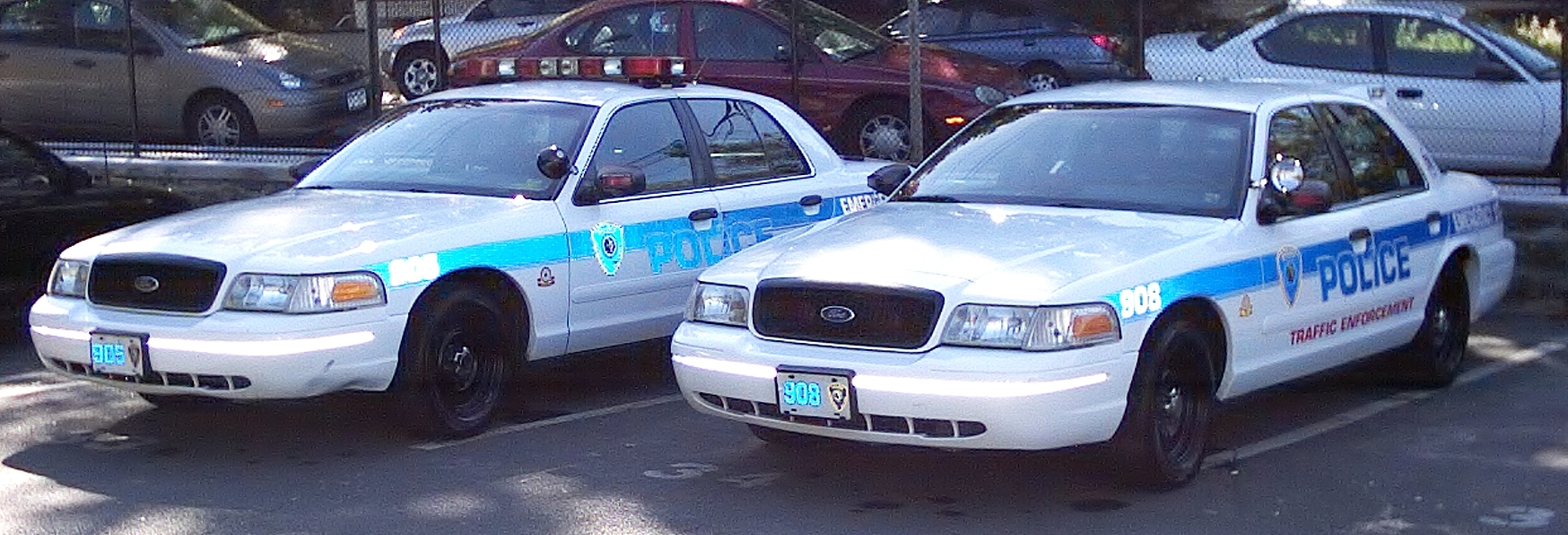
The Ford Crown Victoria Police Interceptor on the left has a roof-mounted lightbar. The one on the right, often called a "slicktop", has internally-mounted lighting devices instead, making it harder to detect at a distance.

Police cars are usually passenger car models which are upgraded to the specifications required by the purchasing police service. Several vehicle manufacturers provide a "police package" option, which is built to police specifications from the factory. Agencies may add to these modifications by adding their own equipment and making their own modifications after purchasing a vehicle.

=== Mechanical modifications ===
Modifications a police car might undergo include adjustments for higher durability, speed, high-mileage driving, and long periods of idling at a higher temperature. This is usually accomplished through installing heavy duty suspension, brakes, calibrated speedometer, tires, alternator, transmission, and cooling systems. The car's stock engine may be modified or replaced by a more powerful engine from another vehicle from the manufacturer. The car's electrical system may also be upgraded to accommodate for the additional electronic police equipment.

=== Warning systems ===
Police vehicles are often fitted with audible and visual warning systems to alert other motorists to their approach or position on the road. In many countries, use of the audible and visual warnings affords the officer a degree of exemption from road traffic laws (such as the right to exceed speed limits, or to treat red stop lights as a yield sign) and may also suggest a duty on other motorists to yield for the police car and allow it to pass.

Warning systems on a police vehicle can be of two types: passive or active.

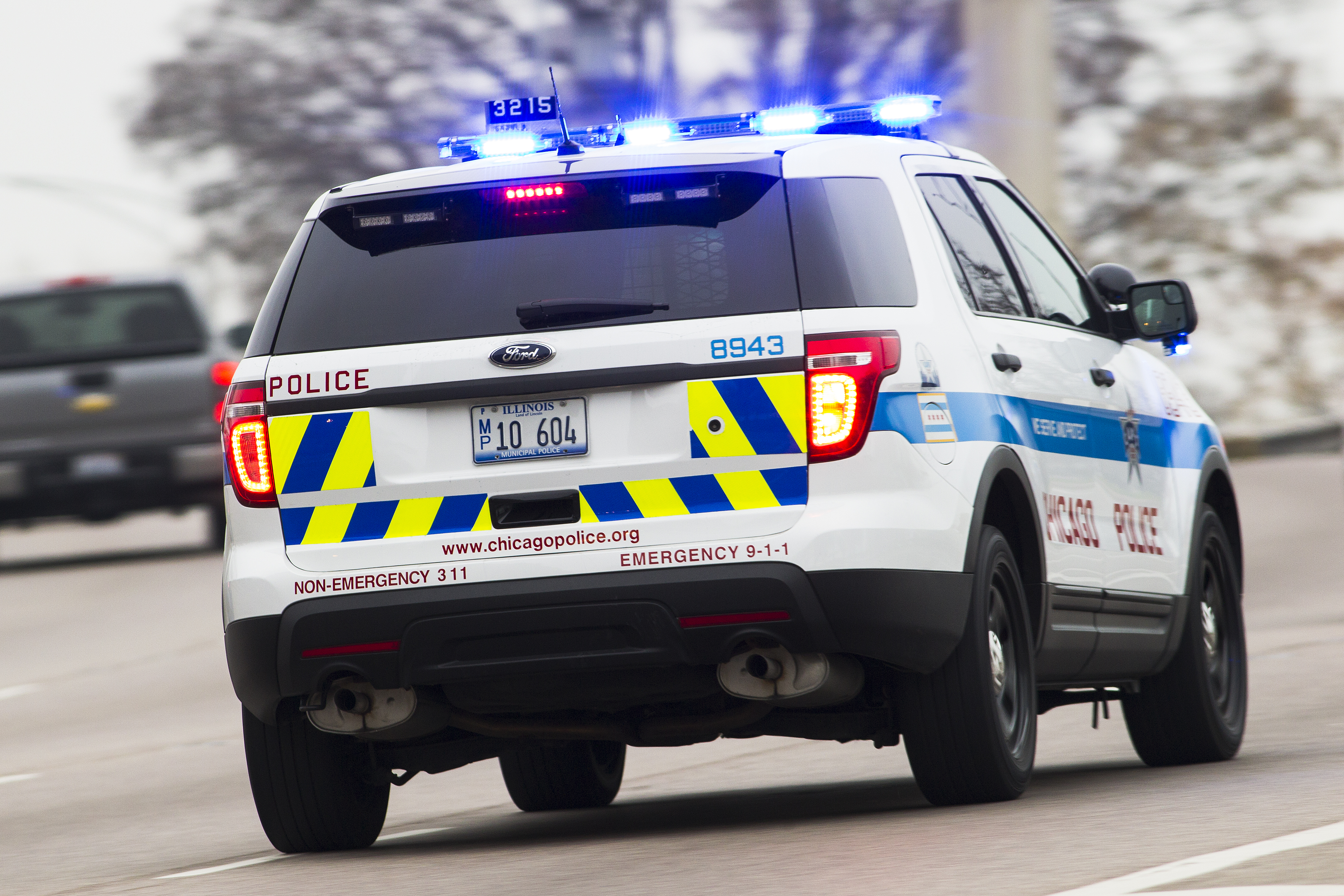
This Chicago Police Department Ford Police Interceptor Utility displays both passive visual warnings (livery markings clearly identifying it as a police vehicle) and active visual warnings (emergency vehicle lighting, currently enabled)

==== Passive visual warnings ====
Passive visual warnings are the livery markings on the vehicle. Police vehicle markings usually make use of bright colors or strong contrast with the base color of the vehicle. Some police cars have retroreflective markings that reflect light for better visibility at night, though others may only have painted on or non-reflective markings. Examples of markings and designs used in police liveries include black and white, Battenburg markings, Sillitoe tartan, and "jam sandwich" markings.

Police vehicle markings include, at the very least, the word "police" (or a similar applicable phrase if the agency does not use that term, such as "gendarmerie", or "public safety", etc.) and the agency's name or jurisdiction (such as "local police", "county sheriff", "state trooper", or "federal agent"). Also common are the agency's seal, the jurisdiction's seal, and a unit number. Text is usually in the national language or local language, though other languages may be used where appropriate, such as in ethnic enclaves, areas with large numbers of tourists, or for agencies serving a specific community such as Shomrim vehicles featuring text in Hebrew.

Unmarked vehicles generally lack passive visual warnings, while ghost cars have markings that are visible only at certain angles, such as from the rear or sides, making them appear unmarked when viewed from the front.

Another unofficial passive visual warning of police vehicles can simply be the vehicle's silhouette if its use as a police car is common, such as that of the Ford Crown Victoria in North America, or the presence of emergency vehicle equipment on the vehicle, such as a pushbar or a roof-mounted lightbar.

==== Active visual warnings ====
Active visual warnings are the emergency lights on the vehicle. These lights are used while responding to attract the attention of other road users and coerce them into yielding for the police car to pass. The colors used by police car lights depend on the jurisdiction, though they are commonly blue and red. Several types of flashing lights are used, such as rotating beacons, halogen lamps, or LED strobes. Some agencies use arrow sticks to direct traffic, or message display boards to provide short messages or instructions to motorists. The headlights and tail lights of some vehicles can be made to flash, or small strobe lights can be fitted in the vehicle lights.

==== Audible warnings ====
A Toronto Police Service Ford Police Interceptor Sedan using its emergency lights and sirens to pass through dense traffic and an intersection

Audible warnings are the sirens on the vehicle. These sirens alert road users to the presence of an emergency vehicle before they can be seen, to warn of their approach. The first audible warnings were mechanical bells, mounted to either the front or roof of the car. A later development was the rotating air siren, which makes noise when air moves past it. Most modern police vehicles use electronic sirens, which can produce a range of different noises. Different models and manufacturers have distinct siren noises; one siren model, the Rumbler, emits a low frequency sound that can be felt through vibrations, allowing those who would not otherwise hear the siren or see the emergency vehicle to still know it is approaching.

Different siren noises may be used depending on traffic conditions and the context. For example, on a clear road, "wail" (a long up-and-down unbroken tone) is often used, whereas in heavy slow traffic or at intersections, "yelp" (essentially a sped-up wail) may be preferred. Other noises are used in certain countries and jurisdictions, such as "phaser" (a series of brief sped-up yelps) and "hi-lo" (a two-tone up-down sound). Some vehicles may also be fitted with electronic airhorns.

=== Police-specific equipment ===
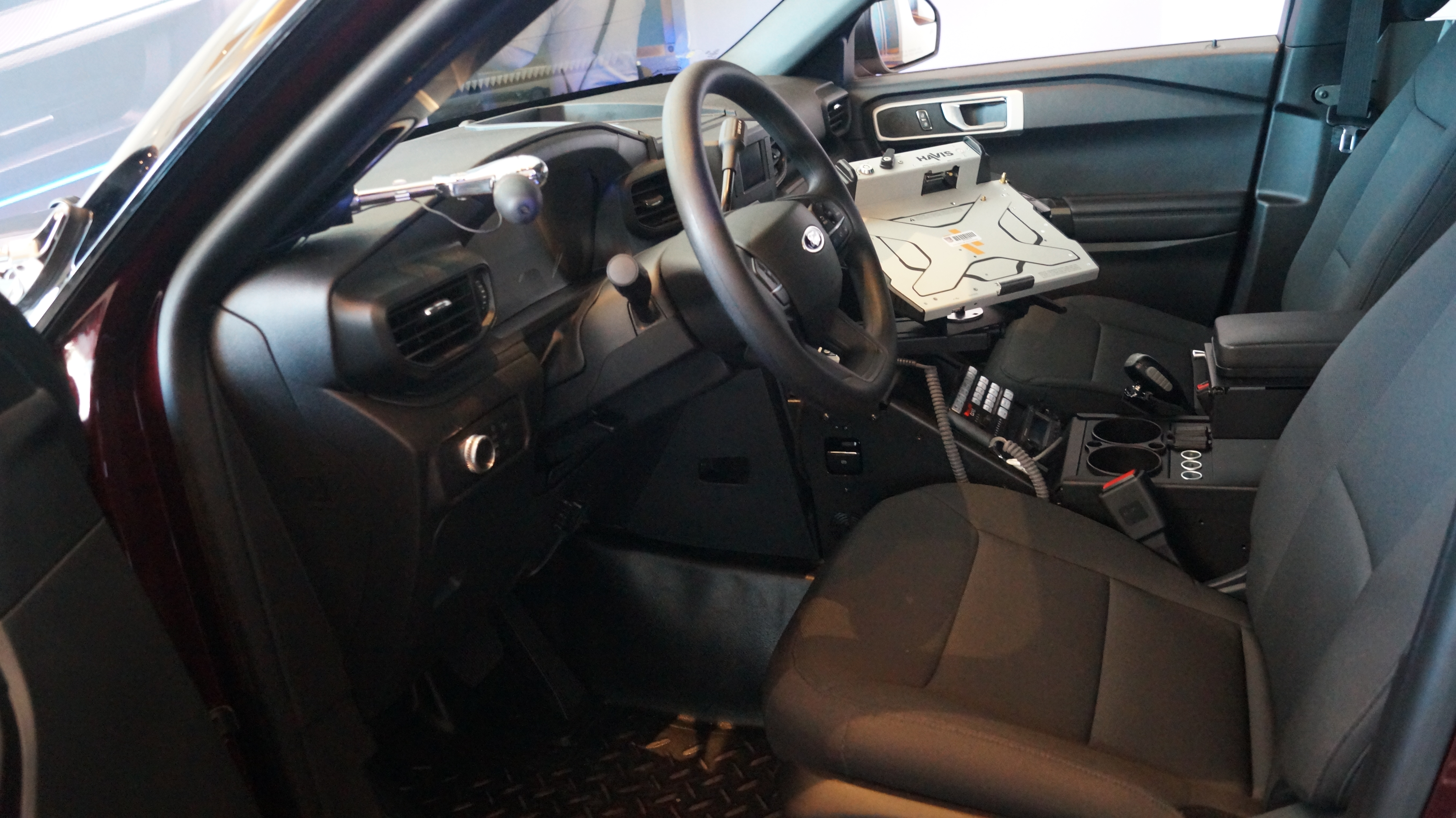
The interior of a 2023 Ford Police Interceptor Utility, featuring a lights/sirens console, radio transceiver, mobile data terminal mount, spotlight swivel, and dashboard indent for a dashcam or aftermarket devices

A wide range of equipment is carried in police cars, used to make police work easier or safer. The installation of this equipment in a police car partially transforms it into a desk. Police officers use their car to fill out different forms, print documents, type on a computer or a console, and examine different screens, all while driving. Ergonomics in layout and installation of these items in the police car plays an important role in the comfort and safety of the police officers at work and preventing injuries such as back pain and musculoskeletal disorders.

==== Communication devices ====
Police radio systems are generally standard equipment in police cars, used to communicate between the officers assigned to the car and the dispatcher. Mobile data terminals are also common as alternative ways to communicate with the dispatcher or receive important information, and are typically a tablet or a dashboard-mounted laptop installed in the car.

==== Suspect transport enclosure ====
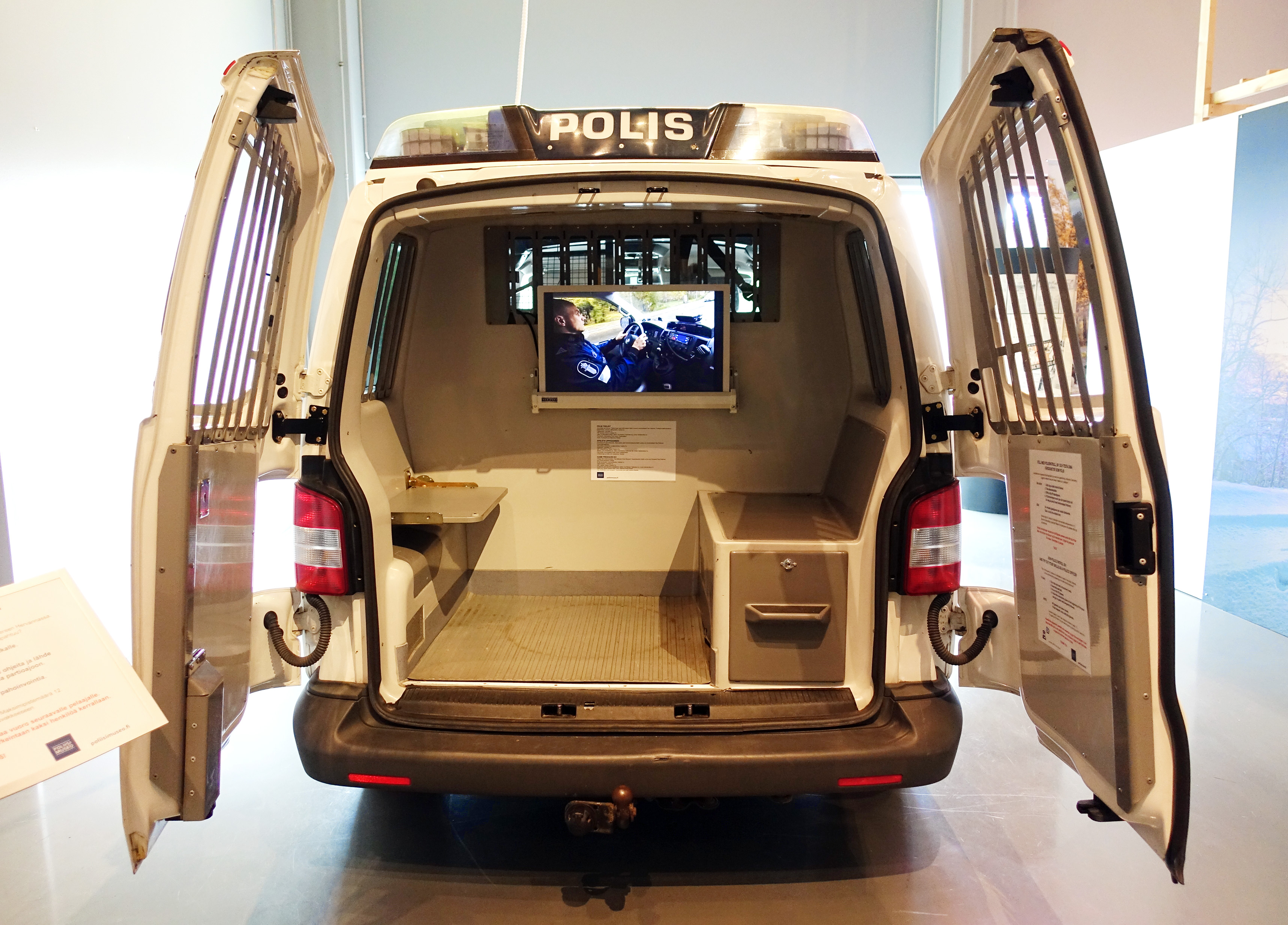
A separate compartment at the rear of a police van used to carry suspects

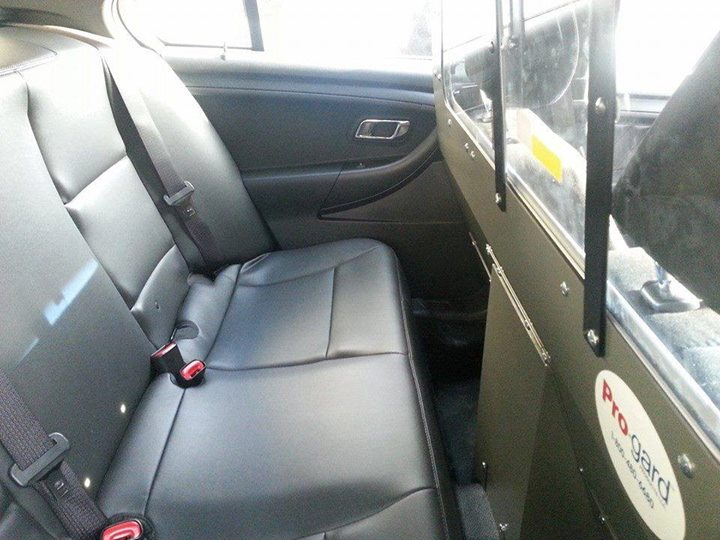
A barrier separating the rear and front seats of a police car, called a "partition" or "cage"

Suspect transport enclosures are typically located at the rear of the vehicle, taking up the rear seats or rear compartment. The seats are sometimes modified to be a hard metal or plastic bench. Separating the transport enclosure is often a partition, a barrier between the front and rear compartments typically made of metal with a window made of reinforced glass, clear plastic, or metal mesh or bars. Some police cars do not have partitions; in these instances, another officer may have to sit in the rear to secure the detainee, or a dedicated transport vehicle may be called.

==== Weapon storage ====
Weapons may be stored in the trunk or front compartment of the vehicle. In countries where police officers are already armed with handguns, long guns such as rifles or shotguns may be kept on a gun rack in the front or in the trunk, alongside ammunition. In countries where police are not armed or do not keep their guns on them, handguns may be kept in the car instead; for example, Norwegian Police Service officers are issued handguns, but they keep them in a locked compartment in their car that requires high-ranking authorization to access. Less-lethal weaponry and riot gear may also be stored in the trunk.

==== Rescue equipment ====
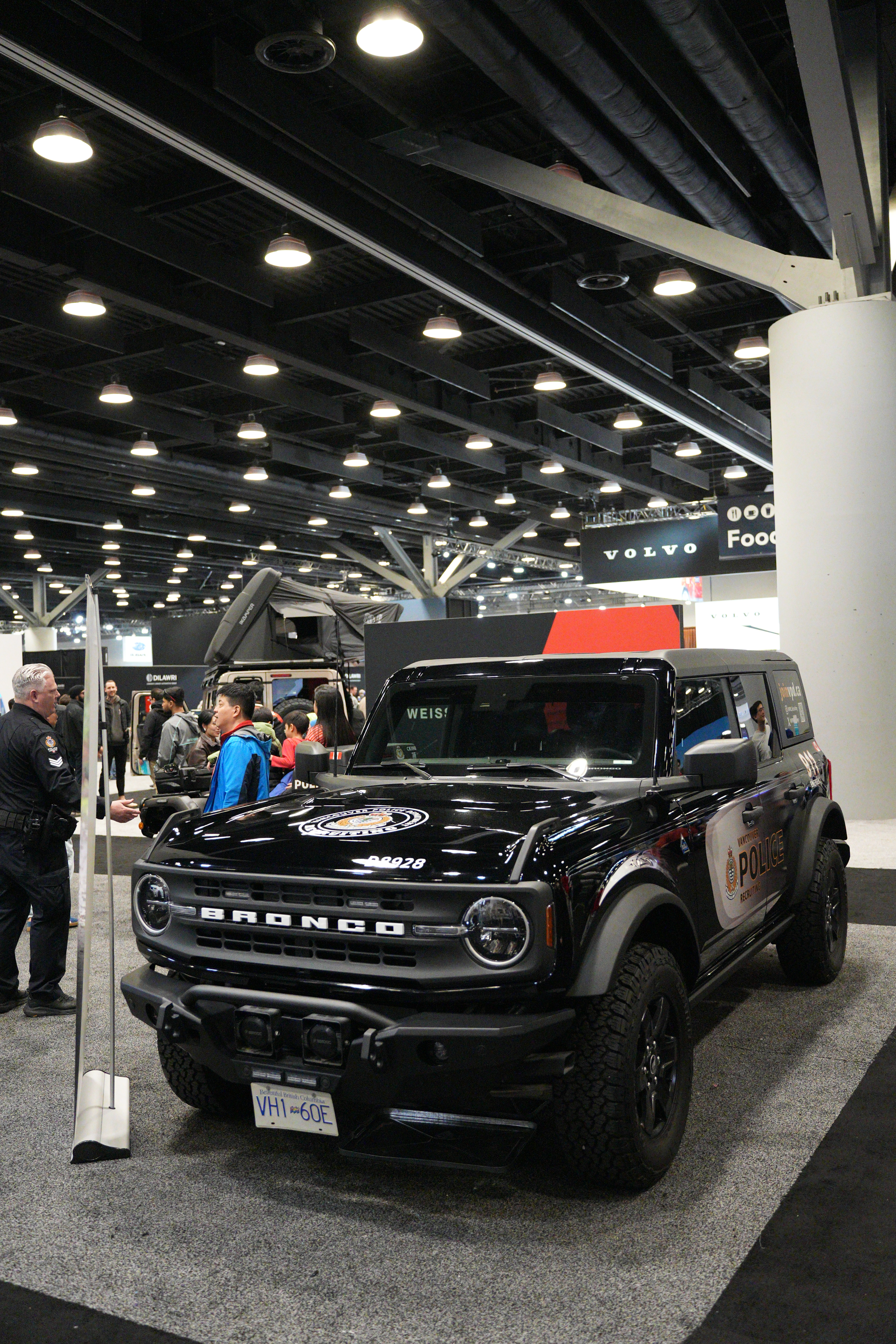
A Ford Bronco patrol/utility vehicle in Vancouver Police Department livery, displayed at an auto show with a VPD officer standing nearby

Rescue equipment such as first aid kits, dressing, fire extinguishers, defibrillators, and naloxone kits are often kept in police cars to provide first aid and rescue when necessary.

==== Scene equipment ====
Tools such as barricade tape, traffic cones, traffic barricades, and road flares are often kept in police cars to secure scenes for further investigation.

==== Recording equipment ====
Recording equipment such as dashcams and interior cameras are installed in some police cars to make audio and video recordings of incidents, police interactions, and evidence.

==== Detectors ====
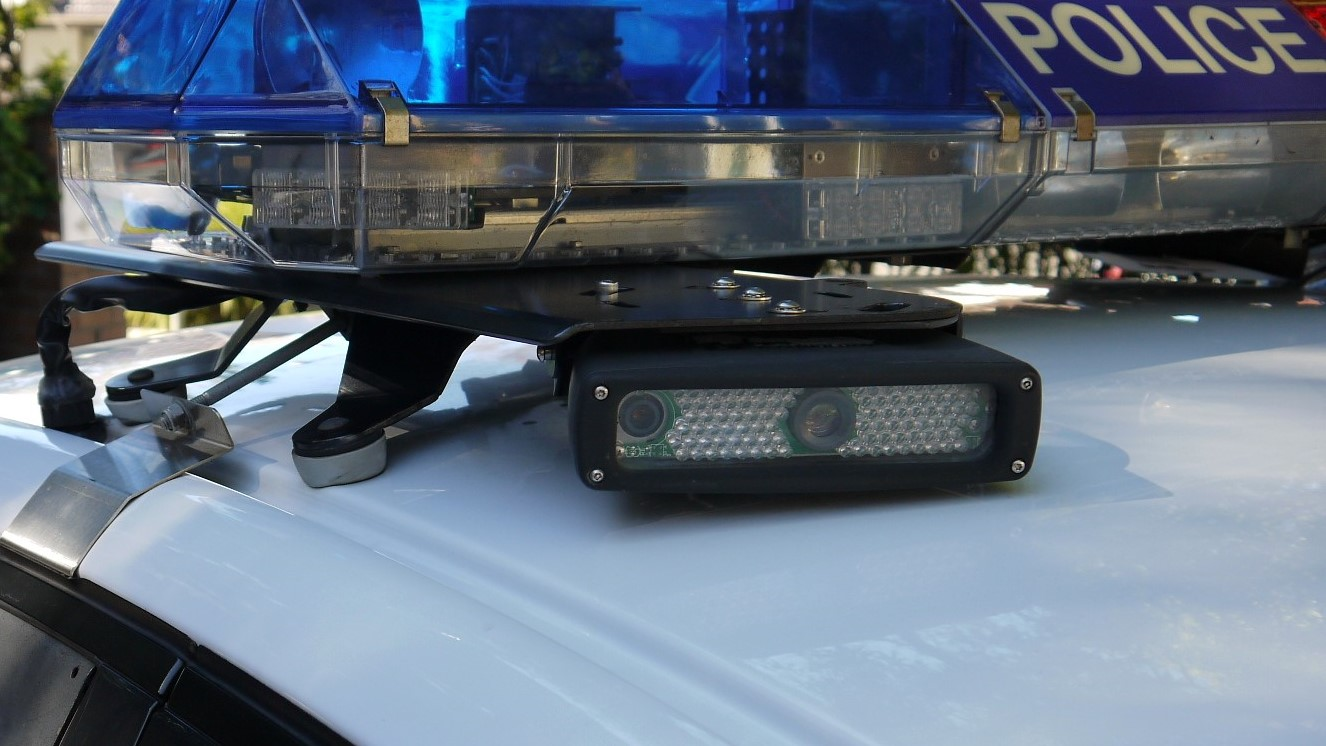
Automatic number-plate recognition cameras fitted underneath a police car's lightbar

Detector devices such as radar speed guns, automatic number-plate recognition, and LoJack are used in some police cars, typically in traffic enforcement, to detect speeding violations, read multiple plates for flags (such as warrants or lack of insurance) without having to manually check, and track stolen cars, respectively.

==== Pushbar ====
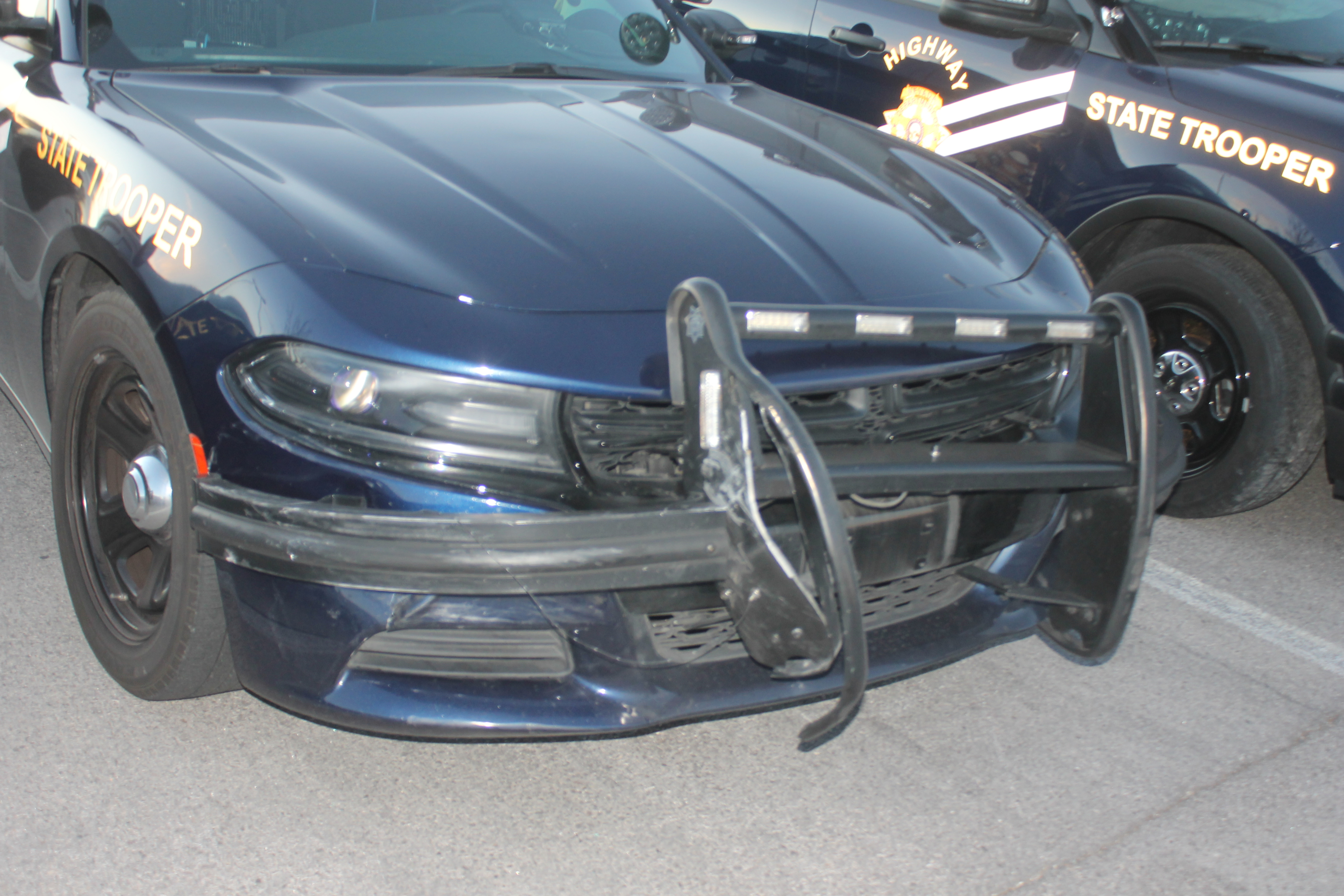
A Nevada State Police Dodge Charger Pursuit with a damaged pushbar. The pushbar protected the front of the vehicle from damage.

Pushbars, also known as bullbars, rambars, or nudge bars, are fitted to the chassis of a police car to augment the front bumper. They allow the car to push disabled vehicles out of a roadway, breach small and light objects, and conduct PIT maneuvers with less damage to the front of the vehicle. Pushbar designs vary; some are small and only protect the grille, while others have extensions that shield as far as the headlights. Some pushbars also have emergency lights installed on them, providing additional visual warnings.

==== Spotlights ====
Spotlights are small searchlights typically installed on the front of a police car. They are used to provide light in darkened areas or where necessary, such as down alleyways or into a suspect's car during a nighttime traffic stop. These spotlights can be activated and aimed by the officers inside the vehicle. Usually, one or two are installed on the A-pillar of the vehicle, though additional fixed searchlights may occasionally be installed on the roof, grille, bumper, or pushbar; these are sometimes called "alley lights".

==== Run lock ====
Run locks allow the vehicle's engine to be left running without the keys being in the ignition. This allows adequate power to be supplied to the vehicle's equipment at the scene of an incident without battery drain. The vehicle can only be driven after inserting the keys; if the keys are not inserted, the engine will switch off if the handbrake is disengaged or the footbrake is activated.

=== Ballistic protection ===
Some police cars can be optionally upgraded with bullet-resistant armor in the car doors. The armor is typically made from ceramic ballistic plates and aramid baffles. A 2016 news report said that Ford sells 5 to 10 percent of their American police vehicles with ballistic protection in the doors. In 2017, New York City Mayor Bill de Blasio announced that all NYPD patrol cars would have bullet-resistant door panels and bullet-resistant window inserts installed.

== Use by country ==
- Police vehicles in Armenia
- Police vehicles in Australia
- Police vehicles in Austria
- Police vehicles in Belgium
- Police vehicles in China
- Police vehicles in the Czech Republic
- Police vehicles in Denmark
- Police vehicles in France
- Police vehicles in Germany
- Police vehicles in Greece
- Police vehicles in Hong Kong
- Police vehicles in Hungary
- Police vehicles in Iceland
- Police vehicles in India
- Police vehicles in Indonesia
- Police vehicles in Italy
- Police vehicles in Japan
- Police vehicles in Malaysia
- Police vehicles in the Netherlands
- Police vehicles in New Zealand
- Police vehicles in The Philippines
- Police vehicles in Poland
- Police vehicles in Romania
- Police vehicles in Russia
- Police vehicles in South Africa
- Police vehicles in Sweden
- Police vehicles in Taiwan
- Police vehicles in Turkey
- Police vehicles in Ukraine
- Police vehicles in the United Kingdom
- Police vehicles in the United States and Canada
- Police vehicles in Vietnam
- Police vehicles in South Korea

== See also ==
=== General ===
- Battenburg markings
- Emergency vehicle
- Police transportation
- Mounted police
- Use of UAVs in law enforcement

=== Other types of emergency vehicles ===
- Ambulance
- D.A.R.E. car
- Fire chief's vehicle
- Fire motorcycle
- Fire truck
- Jam sandwich (police car)
- Military police vehicle
- Panda car (British police forces)
- Police aircraft
- Police bus
- Police motorcycle
- Police van
- Police watercraft
- Police armored vehicle
