= Traffic regulations =

Traffic regulations may refer to:

- Motor vehicle traffic regulations (rules of the road)
  - Highway Code in the United Kingdom
  - Traffic code in the United States
  - Vienna Convention on Road Traffic for international standards
- Air traffic control
- International Regulations for Preventing Collisions at Sea
