= Traffic code =

Traffic regulations, laws, and rules

Traffic codes are laws that generally include provisions relating to the establishment of authority and enforcement procedures, statement of the rules of the road, and other safety provisions. Administrative regulations for driver licensing, vehicle ownership and registration, insurance, vehicle safety inspections and parking violations may also be included, though not always directly related to driving safety. Violations of traffic code (i.e., a "moving violation") are often dealt with by forfeiting a fine in response to receiving a valid citation ("getting a ticket"). Other violations, such as drunk driving or vehicular homicide are handled through the criminal courts, although there may also be civil and administrative cases that arise from the same violation (including payment of damages and loss of driving privileges). In some jurisdictions, there is a separate code-enforcement branch of government that handles illegal parking and other non-moving violations (e.g., noise and other emissions, illegal equipment). Elsewhere, there may be multiple overlapping police agencies patrolling for violations of state or federal driving regulations.

== United States ==
For the traffic code in the United States, each state has its own traffic code, although most of the rules of the road are similar for the purpose of uniformity, given that all states grant reciprocal driving privileges (and penalties) to each other's licensed drivers. There is also a "Uniform Vehicle Code" which has been proposed by a private, non-profit group, based upon input by its members. As with many such offerings, some states adopt selected portions as written, or else with modifications, and others create their own versions. Similarly, most states have adopted relevant standards for signs and signals, based upon the Manual on Uniform Traffic Control Devices from the U.S. Department of Transportation. Many of the standard rules of the road involve consistent interpretation of the standard signs and signals, such as what to do when approaching a stop sign, or the driving requirements imposed by a double yellow line on the street or highway. Many federal departments have also adopted their own traffic code for enforcement on their respective reservations (e.g., national parks, military bases).

== Other countries ==
Most countries define national legislation relative to car driving and penalties. Most of those regulations have some common basis to help people driving between countries. International conventions such as the Vienna Convention on Road Traffic and Vienna Convention on Road Signs and Signals have helped in harmonization of traffic laws across countries.

Road, driving and traffic regulations are the subject to specific codification of the law in countries such as:

- Austria: Straßenverkehrsordnung (StVO)
- Brazil: Código de Trânsito Brasileiro (Brazilian Traffic Code), based on the Vienna Convention
- Canada (Manitoba): The Codification Permanente des Lois du Manitoba contains legislation called "Highway Traffic Act", translated as Code de la route in French (chapter H 060).
- Canada (Quebec): Code de la sécurité routière (Highway Safety Code)
- Cuba: Código de Seguridad Vial (Road Safety Code)
- Estonia: Liikluseeskiri
- France: Code de la route
- Germany: Straßenverkehrs-Ordnung
- Greece: Κώδικας Οδικής Κυκλοφορίας
- Italy: Codice della strada
- Lithuania: Kelių eismo taisyklės (KET)
- Luxembourg: In Luxembourg, the equivalent legislation is called Code de la route and is considered codes-loi ("law-code") or recueil de Législation Routière.
- Malta: The Highway Code
- Nigeria: Highway Code
- Philippines: Land Transportation and Traffic Code (Republic Act No. 4136)
- Poland: Prawo o ruchu drogowym
- Portugal: Código da estrada
- Romania: Codul rutier
- Russia: Правила дорожного движения Российской Федерации
- Switzerland: Verkehrsregelnverordnung (VRV)
- Turkey: Karayolları Trafik Kanunu
- Ukraine: Правила дорожнього руху

In Morocco, the law loi n°52-05 portant code de la route deals with a new traffic code, approved on 14 January 2009 and adopted on 11 February 2010 (26 Safar 1431 in the Islamic calendar).

Belgium traffic code regulation is not a code although it is road traffic specific. It is defined by Koninklijk besluit houdende algemeen reglement op de politie van het wegverkeer en van het gebruik van de openbare weg. [KB. 09.12.1975].

In Switzerland, this legislation is not considered a code as it is law number 741.01.

In the United Kingdom there is no codification. Some laws, such as a Road Traffic Act 1988 and a Traffic Signs Regulations and General Directions, do exist; a manual titled Highway Code is edited by a public entity with guidelines based on and/or compatible with local law.

In European Union law, legislation is more oriented on transport competition and not on sharing the road. There is some effort oriented to issues such as driver's license and car control.

See also:

- Australian Road Rules about legislation and rules and their history in Australia

See also small-mini-drafts:

- New Zealand Road Code about the official and public learning book of New Zealand
- Road rules in Hong Kong where there is no single act governing rules of the road like other jurisdictions.
- Rules of the Road (Ireland)
- Highway Traffic Act (Ontario, Canada)

== See also ==
- Traffic
- Vehicle registration plate
- Vienna Convention on Road Traffic
- Vienna Convention on Road Signs and Signals
- Highway Code, the equivalent document in the UK
- Uniform Vehicle Code, as implemented by individual jurisdictions in the US
