= ROTR =

ROTR can refer to:

- Rules of the road (disambiguation), in any of that term's senses (eg, transportation, entertainment)
- ROTR (video game), a shoot'em up video game for the Nintendo DS and Wii from Nibris
- The Return of the Regulator, a 2001 album by rapper Warren G
- Reviews on the Run, a video game review TV show
- Rise of the Robots, a 1994 video game
- Rise of the Runelords, a 2007 Adventure Path for Dungeons & Dragons and the Pathfinder Roleplaying Game.
- Rise of the Tomb Raider, a 2015 video game
- Robots on the Road, a traveling robotics program for middle school students, operated by NASA's Aerospace Education Services Project
- Rock on the Range, an annual music festival held in Columbus, Ohio and Winnipeg, Canada
- Rumble on the Rock: a mixed martial arts tournament
- Run-of-the-river hydroelectricity, a type of power generation
- Star Wars: Rise of the Resistance, a Star Wars themed attraction at Disney's Hollywood Studios in Walt Disney World and Disneyland
