= Rule of the road =

Rule of the road may refer to:

- Left- and right-hand traffic, regulations requiring all vehicular traffic to keep either to the left or the right side of the road
- Traffic code (also motor vehicle code), the collection of local statutes, regulations, ordinances and rules which that govern public (and sometimes private) ways

== See also ==
- Rules of the road (disambiguation)
