= Driver's manual =

United States of America road safety guide

A driver's manual is a book created by the driving authority of a governing body, or a state in order to give information to people about their driving laws. Manuals often outline road laws, driving restrictions, and license renewal.

== Driver's manuals by country ==
=== United States ===
In the United States, it is left up to each individual state to decide how to create a driving manual.

The beginning of every manual starts with how to get a driver's license. It informs potential drivers about what types of identification are needed, as well as the eligibility requirements necessary to get a license. In most states, these potential drivers "must provide documentary proof of their full legal name, age, Social Security number, citizenship, or legal presence and address." (Ohio Driver's Manual). In all states there is a minimum age requirement for getting a driver's permit, which later leads into receiving a full driver's license. This age limit varies by state. "The person must also be in good general health, and can have good vision with or without glasses or contacts." (New Jersey Driver's Manual). There is also usually a payment fee in order to receive your license. Along with getting a license, all states also offer voter registration and becoming an organ donor when applying for your license. Every state requires taking a written test to receive your driver's permit. Every state also requires a driver's test that you must pass in order to get your license. However, only a few of the states' manuals actually go into detail about what exactly they will test you on for the driving test. All manuals proceed to talk about the specifics of how to drive and the rules of the road.

Every manual includes a section that goes into detail about car and driver safety. All states require vehicle inspection, but only some require annual inspection. Driving while intoxicated is illegal in the United States. Almost all states have a "minimum blood alcohol level while driving of .08%" (Kentucky Driver's Manual). For seat belts, 49 states and the District of Columbia have passed laws requiring seat belt use by at least all occupants of the front seat, with New Hampshire being the only state to not have such a requirement for adult drivers. However, in all states it is mandatory for anyone under the age of 18 to wear a seat belt. Vehicles must always make way for emergency vehicles.

==== Canada ====
Similar to the United States, each individual province and territory in Canada has their own driver's manual, or guide; there is no single universal driver's manual applicable to the entirety of Canada, as all provinces and territories have their own laws related to driving and traffic safety that may differ from that of another province or territory.

== See also ==
- The Highway Code, the equivalent guide in the United Kingdom
- Malta's The Highway Code, the equivalent guide in Malta
- Road Users' Code, the equivalent guide in Hong Kong
