= List of equipment of the Philippine National Police =

Equipment used by the Philippine National Police

There follows a list of equipment used by the Philippine National Police.

== Vehicles ==
Picture	Model	Origin	Type	Notes
Amphibious Vehicle
	GAZ 3409	Russia	Amphibious ATV	Used by PNP-Special Action Force, delivered in 2018.
Armored Vehicles
	V-150 Cadillac Gage Commando	United States	Armoured personnel carrier	28 units used by the PNP-Special Action Force. Although the number of active vehicles might be less. 2 captured by Maute Group fighters in May 2017.
	Shladot-MDT Armor Tiger Mk. II	Israel	Armoured personnel carrier/MRAP	6 units acquired in 2019 used by PNP-Special Action Force. Armed with cupola-mounted 12.7mm or 7.62mm machine gun.
	AM General HMMWV	United States	Armored tactical vehicle	25 M1114 provided in 2013 shared between the Philippine Army and PNP-SAF.
MX-8 Armored Escort Vehicle	Steelcraft MX-8 Armored Escort Vehicle	Philippines	Armored tactical vehicle	2 Prototype units of MX-8 Mark 3 Delivered and used by Special Action Force.
	CTK Armored Vehicle	Philippines	Armoured personnel carrier	Several in PNP-Special Action Force inventory. Based on locally developed bank armored vehicles. Only used on urban operations. Some Donated by Cities to Local SWAT units.
	Ford F550	United States	SWAT car	Donation in 2019 from the Bureau of Customs and used by Cagayan Valley Regional Office, and National Headquarters.
Motorcycles
	Honda XRM	Philippines; Japan	police motorcycle	Used by Cities and Municipalities in service since 2006.
	Yamaha RX-King 135	Japan	police motorcycle	Donated by Public Safety Savings and Loan Association, Inc. (PSSLAI) in 2013.
	Honda XR 150L	Japan	police motorcycle	Used by Cities and Municipalities since 2014.
	Honda CRF300L	Japan	police motorcycle	Donated in 2014 by United States of America Used for Eastern Visayas in service since 2014 .
	Yamaha FZ16	Japan	police motorcycle	Used by Cities and Municipalities since 2015. Donated by Public Safety Savings and Loan Association, Inc. (PSSLAI) in 2015.
	Kawasaki Ninja 650R	Japan	police motorcycle	Used by PNP-Highway Patrol Group since 2015. and Butuan City Police Office
	Kawasaki Rouser	India; Japan	police motorcycle	Used by Cities and Municipalities since 2015.
PNP Kawasaki Versys 650cc Patrol Motorcycle	Kawasaki Versys 650	Japan	police motorcycle	Used by PNP-Highway Patrol Group since 2018. Police Security and Protection Group, Sorsogon Police Provincial Office, and Butuan City Police Office
	Hyosung Aquila Grand Voyage GV125S	South Korea	police motorcycle	Donation in 2018 from the South Korean Government and used by National Support Units and selected cities where Korean communities are established.
	BMW G 310 R	Germany	police motorcycle	Used by Philippine National PoliceHighway Patrol Group donated by San Miguel Corp in 2018.
	Yamaha NMAX	Japan	police motorcycle	Used by Cities and Municipalities since 2019.
Kawasaki versys 1000 PNP	Kawasaki Versys 1000	Japan	police motorcycle	Used by PNP-Highway Patrol Group since 2020. and Police Security and Protection Group
	KTM 390 series	Austria	police motorcycle	Used by Philippine National PoliceHighway Patrol Group donated by Delgado Brothers (Delbros Group) in 2021.
	CFMoto 650	China	police motorcycle	Used by Philippine National Police donated by People's Republic of China to Davao in 2021 .
	BMW F750GS	Germany	police motorcycle	Used by Pampanga Highway Patrol Group since 2021.
	Suzuki Burgman Street	Japan	police motorcycle	Used by Cities and Municipalities since 2023.
	HondaCB500F	Japan	police motorcycle	Used by Philippine National PoliceHighway Patrol Group donated by Newport World Resorts in 2024.
	Honda ADV 160	Japan	police motorcycle	Used by Cities and Municipalities since 2025.
	Honda 650	Japan	police motorcycle	Used by Romblon Province since 2026.
Auto rickshaw
	Bajaj RE autorickshaw	India	Auto rickshaw	Used by Davao Oriental Police Provincial Office (DOPPO) since 2021.
Hybrid Electric Vehicles
	Toyota Prius	Japan	police car	Donation in granted in 2015 from the Japanese Government. Delivered in 2018 for Eastern Visayas Regions
	BYD Dolphin	China	police car	Used by Valenzuela City since 2024.
	Aion Y	China	police car	Used by Bacolod City since 2026.
	VinFast VF 3	Vietnam	police car	Used by the municipality of Noveleta in Cavite. since 2026.
Hatchback
	Toyota Wigo	Japan	Police Car	Used by Cavite Provincial Police Office.
Sedan
	Toyota Vios	Japan	Police Car	Used by Cities Manila Police District and Sorsogon Province.
Nissan Almera 1.5 E Pasig City police vehicle	Nissan Almera	Japan	Police Car	Used by Cities Pasig City and Manila City.
	Hyundai Elantra	South Korea	police car	Donation in 2018 from the South Korean Government and used by National Support Units and selected cities where Korean communities are established.
	Toyota Corolla Altis	Japan	police car	Used by PNP-Highway Patrol Group since 2015.
Multi-Purpose Vehicle
Funerals in the Philippines	Suzuki Carry (DC61T/DN61T)	Japan	police car	Used by National Capital Region Police Office. In Service since 2019.
	Kia K-2700	South Korea	police jeep	Used by Public Safety Battalions and Companies since 2015.
	Mitsubishi L300	Japan	police jeep	Used by Cavite Provincial Police Office and Baguio City Police Office.
	Mitsubishi Adventure	Japan	police car	Used by Police Forces in Baguio City, Bacoor City and Tagaytay City. Also used by Crime Laboratory and SOCO Units.
	Isuzu Crosswind	Japan	police car	Used by Cities and Municipalities.
	Mahindra Xylo	India	Police car	Used by the Cities and Municipalities. Used by Cebu Provincial Police Office since 2018
	Toyota Innova	Japan	police car	Used by Police Forces in Cities and Municipalities.
	Toyota Veloz	Japan	police car	Used by Police Forces in Cities and Municipalities.
MG ZS 1.5 Style Marikina City police car	MG ZS (crossover)	China	police car	Used by Marikina City since 2020.
Toyota Avanza 1.3 E 2021 Muntinlupa Police Car	Toyota Avanza	Japan	police car	Used by Police Forces in Cities and Municipalities.
	Toyota Rush	Japan	police car	Used by Police Forces in Cities and Municipalities.
Pickup
2023 Ford Ranger 2.0 XL 4x4 PNP EOD SECU Taguig K9 Group vehicle, 07-28-2024	Ford Ranger	United States	police car	Multiple Donation from the United States Government in 2021 and 2023
	Mitsubishi Triton	Japan	police jeep	Also known as Mitsubishi Strada until 2023.
	Nissan Navara	Japan	police jeep	Used by Cabanatuan City Police Office and Pampanga Province.
	Isuzu D-Max	Japan	police jeep	Used by Cities .
	Mahindra Enforcer	India	police jeep	Used by the Cities and Municipalities. Future plans for procurement suspended due to being seen as unfit for police operations.
	Toyota Hilux FX	Japan	police jeep	Commonly found and used all across police units in the Philippines.
	Ford Ranger Raptor	United States	police jeep	Ford Ranger Raptor Variant is also used by Police forces in Tagaytay City and Pampanga Highway Patrol Group since 2021.
Sport Utility Vehicle
	Mitsubishi Montero Sport	Japan	police car	Donation in 2017 from the Japanese Government
	Toyota Fortuner	Japan	police car	Used By Cities as Command Car.
0001jfVigils demonstrations Media coverages Ferdinand Edralin Marcos Burial Cases Judgmentfvf	Mahindra Scorpio	India	police car	In Service since 2015 .Used by Regional Offices and Support Units. Future plans for procurement suspended due to being seen unfit for police operations.
Van
	Hyundai Stargazer	South Korea	police van	Donation in 2024 from the Hyundai Motor Philippines and used by PNP Command Group and Directorate for Logistics.
	Hyundai Grand Starex	South Korea	police van	Donation in 2018 from the South Korean Government and used by National Support Units and selected cities where Korean communities are established. Also being used by Police Forces in Dasmariñas City.
	Hyundai H350	South Korea	police van	Used by PNP-Special Action Force
	Mercedes-Benz Sprinter	Germany	police van	Donation from the United States Government in 2015. and used only for CBRNE.
	Nissan NV 350 Urvan	Japan	police van	Used by PNP-Special Action Force and PNP Medical Command
	Toyota Hiace	Japan	police van	Used by National Support Units and Crime Laboratory Service. In service since 2015.
Bus
	Hino XZU730L Mini Bus	Japan	police bus	Used by Regional offices and support units
Police bus used by Regional Office 48 of the Philippine National Police. Taken at the Tagaytay Mahogany Beef Market on Tagaytay, Cavite, Philippines.	Toyota Coaster	Japan	police bus	Used by Regional Offices, and Support Units
Truck
	GAZ Sadko	Russia	police truck	Used by PNP-Special Action Force since 2019
	Hino 300 Series	Japan	police truck	Used by PNP-Special Action Force since 2018.
	Hino 500 Series	Japan	police truck	Used by Regional Offices, and Support Units since 2018.
	Isuzu Forward	Japan	police truck	Used by Regional Offices, and Support Units since 2019
	Man CLA 18.300	Germany	police truck	Used by Regional Offices, and Support Units since 2013
	Ural Next	Russia	police truck	Used by PNP-Special Action Force

== Aircraft ==
Picture	Model	Origin	Type	Variant	In Service	Notes
Helicopters
	Eurocopter AS350 Écureuil	France	Light utility helicopter	H125	7	The original 5 AS350s are retired, inoperable or scrapped. The current fleet consists of 7 H125 helicopters inducted between 2019 and 2021.
	Robinson R44	United States	Light utility helicopter	R44 Raven II	4	3 acquired in 2008–2009, 1 crashed in 2010. 2 brand new units received in August 2019. 4 units in service total.
Fixed-wing aircraft
	Cessna 150	United States	Trainer Aircraft		1	Cessna 150 with tail number RP-8680 is the primary and only trainer aircraft used for flying training in the Air Unit of the Philippine National Police

== Watercraft ==
Picture	Model	Origin	In Service	Notes
	Baywatch 55' Patrol Boat	Philippines	>2	Donated, catamaran-hulled design. PB-103 and PB-105 seen in Manila Bay area.
	Sea Ark Dauntless 48' Patrol Boat	United States	4	Aluminium hulled. Provided by US government in 2016. Assigned in Palawan.
	Naiad 33' Police Gun Boat (PGB)	United States	6	Aluminium hulled. Provided by US government in August 2010. More units provided by the US government in later years. 2 more donated by US government in August 2012. Boat no. SBU001 to SBU006.
	PNP 40' High Speed Tactical Watercraft (HSTW)	Philippines	60 (+2)	Fibreglass hulled, 45-knot tactical boats. First 21 units built by Propmech Corporation-Safehull Technologies joint venture and delivered starting late 2018. Next 7 units built by Als Marine-FB Design joint venture and were delivered in early 2019. Third batch of 22 units were built and delivered by Dynacast Shipbuilding & Repair in October 2020. Fourth batch for 10 units was delivered by Propech Corporation, and were formally inducted in February 2022. Another 2 units ordered from Propmech Corporation in December 2021.
	Stoneworks Orient Craft 914 Police Fast Boat (PFB)	Philippines	25	9.14m long, acquired in 2012, fibreglass hulled Used in Regions 9, 10, 11, 12 and BARMM.
	Rigid-hulled inflatable boat		unknown	Acquired from multiple suppliers through several projects
	Rubber boat		107	Acquired from multiple suppliers; 21 units received in June 2010, 85 units acquired in 2010.

== Weapons ==
Picture	Model	Origin	Type	Caliber	Variant	In Service	Notes
Pistols
	Glock 17	United States; Austria	semi-automatic pistol	9×19mm Parabellum	Glock 17 Gen 4	70,000+	
	IWI Masada	Israel	semi-automatic pistol	9×19mm Parabellum		>1920	
	Canik TP9	Turkey	semi-automatic pistol	9×19mm Parabellum	TP9SF Elite-S	>10000	
	Zigana	Turkey	semi-automatic pistol	9×19mm Parabellum	PX-9		
	Pindad G2	Indonesia	semi-automatic pistol	9x19mm Parabellum	G2 Combat		
	Taurus TS9	Brazil	semi-automatic pistol	9×19mm Parabellum	TS9 Striker	>2000	
	Beretta 92	Italy	semi-automatic pistol	9×19mm Parabellum	92 FS		
	Girsan MC 9	Turkey	semi-automatic pistol	9×19mm Parabellum	MC 9S	8,358	
Arex Delta Gen 1	Arex Delta	Slovenia	Semi-automatic pistol	9×19mm Parabellum	Delta	8,001	
Assault rifles
	M16 rifle	United States; Philippines	assault rifle	5.56×45mm NATO	M16A1	>30,000	Current standard-issue rifle, either made by Colt USA or Elisco Tool (Elitool) Philippines. 30,000 units were handed-over to the PNP on loan from the Armed Forces of the Philippines, several are with the PNP-SAF.
HK416N	Heckler & Koch HK416	Germany	assault rifle	5.56×45mm NATO	HK416		
	Norinco CQ	China	assault rifle	5.56×45mm NATO	CQ-A5b	6000	Part of donations from China
	IMI Galil ACE	Israel	assault rifle	5.56×45mm NATO	Galil ACE 22N	>8483	
	Emtan MZ-4	Israel	Assault rifle	5.56×45mm NATO	MZ-4 P FRB	>5631	
	Daewoo Precision Industries K2	South Korea	Assault rifle	5.56×45mm NATO	K2C1	1,677	Purchased K2C1 in 2019, based from a contract in 2018
	Dasan DSAR	South Korea	Assault rifle	5.56×45mm NATO	DSAR-15	5,755	Philippine National Police received 5,755 DSAR-15s in 2023
Machine guns
	IWI Negev	Israel	Light machine gun	5.56×45mm NATO 7.62×51mm NATO	NG-7	>320 >231	
	Rheinmetall MG 3	Germany; Pakistan	General-purpose machine gun	7.62x51mm NATO	MG 3	>42	Acquired from Pakistan
Daewoo K3 machine gun 0	Daewoo Precision Industries K3	South Korea	Light machine gun	5.56×45mm NATO	K3	205	
	MMG556	Turkey	Light machine gun	5.56×45mm NATO	MMG556	155	
