= New Zealand Road Code =

Official guide to New Zealand's traffic law and safe driving practices

The New Zealand Road Code is the official road safety manual for New Zealand published by NZ Transport Agency. It is a guide to safe driving practices and traffic law in New Zealand, and is also the basis for theory and practical driving tests.

There are separate editions:

- The Official Road Code (cars and light vehicles requiring a class 1 licence)
- The Official Road Code for Heavy Vehicle Drivers (vehicles 3500 kg and heavier, and licence classes 2–5)
- The Official Road Code for Motorcycles (two-wheeled vehicles, and licence class 6)
- The Official Code for Cyclists provides rules for cyclists on New Zealand's roads.

The latest versions of the printed Road Code books are available online, but in both cases need to be read in conjunction with any updates – which are posted on NZTA's Road Code updates page.

The Road Code contains a list of all questions that can be asked in the theory test for the learner licence. Answers are not included with the questions and must be either deduced from reading the Road Code, or researched using an external website such as Driving Tests.

For tourist drivers, the Visiting Drivers Project has been created to improve road safety for tourists.

== History ==
As Transport Minister in the new Labour Government Bob Semple introduced the first Highway Code in 1936. It had no speed limit, but required motorists to be able to stop in half the distance they could see and not to overtake trams when they stopped. Introduction of the British Highway Code was being well publicised at the time.
