= Rules of the road =

Rules of the road may refer to:

== Transportation ==
- Rules of the Road (Ireland), the official road safety manual for Ireland
- Rules of the road in China
- International Regulations for Preventing Collisions at Sea
- Traffic § Rules of the road

== Arts and entertainment ==
- Rules of the Road (Anita O'Day album), 1993
- Rules of the Road (Lee Kernaghan album), 2000 album
- Rules of the Road, a 1993 documentary film by Oliver Herbrich
- Rules of the Road, a 1993 short film by Su Friedrich

== See also ==
- Rule of the road (disambiguation)
- Australian Road Rules
- Road Rules (TV series)
