= Police vehicles in Taiwan =

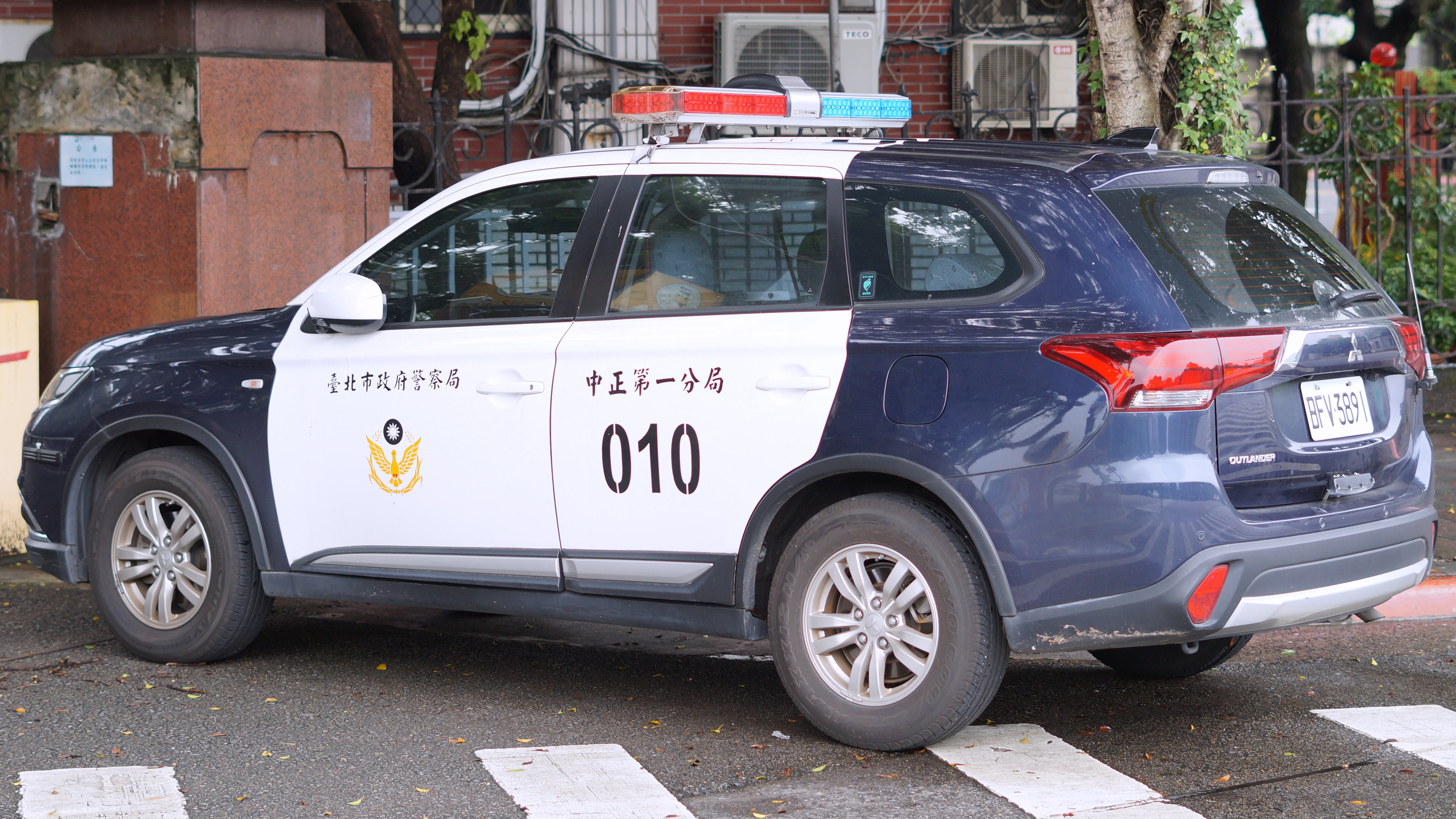
Mitsubishi Outlander police car

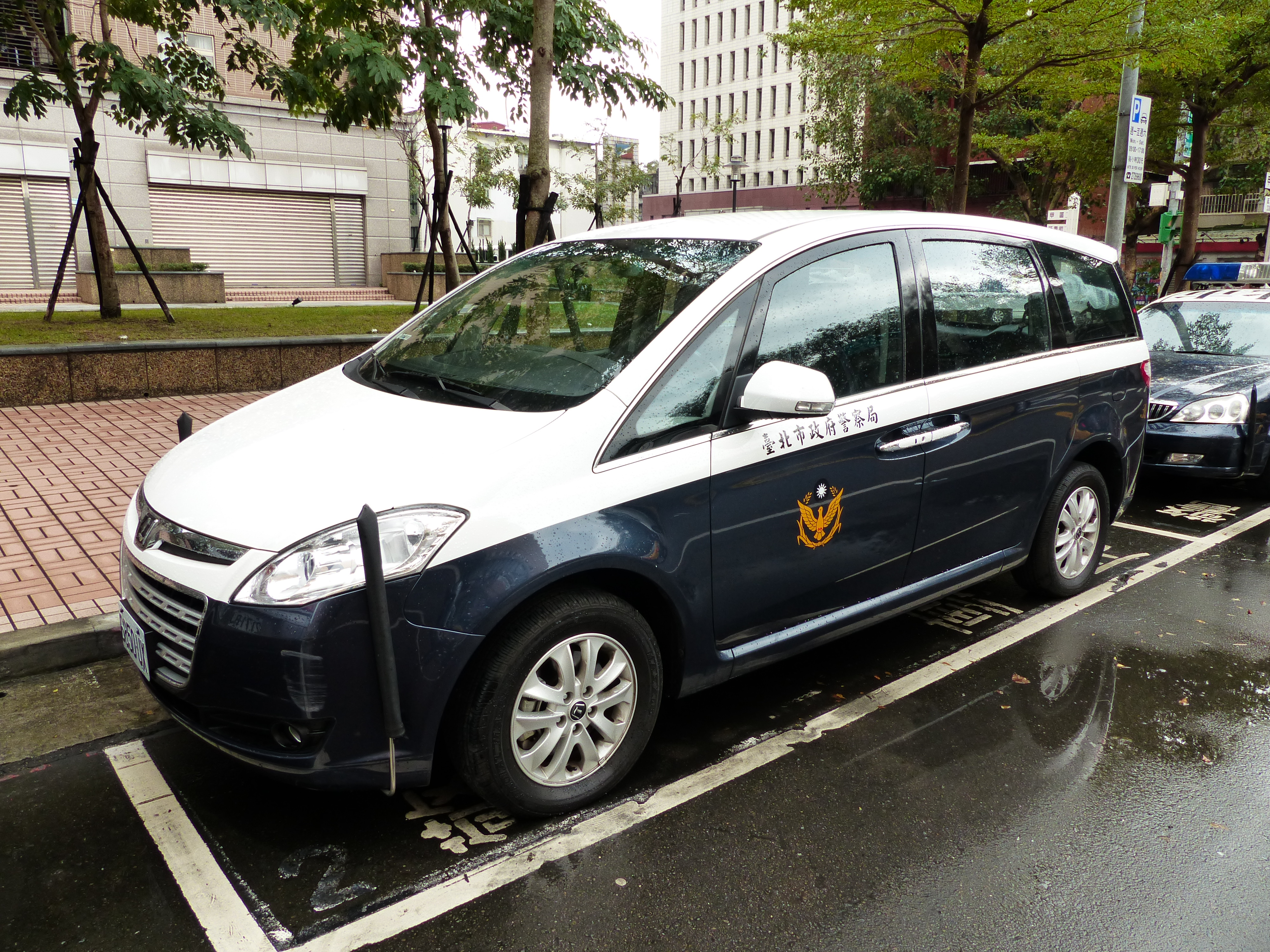
Luxgen M7 police car

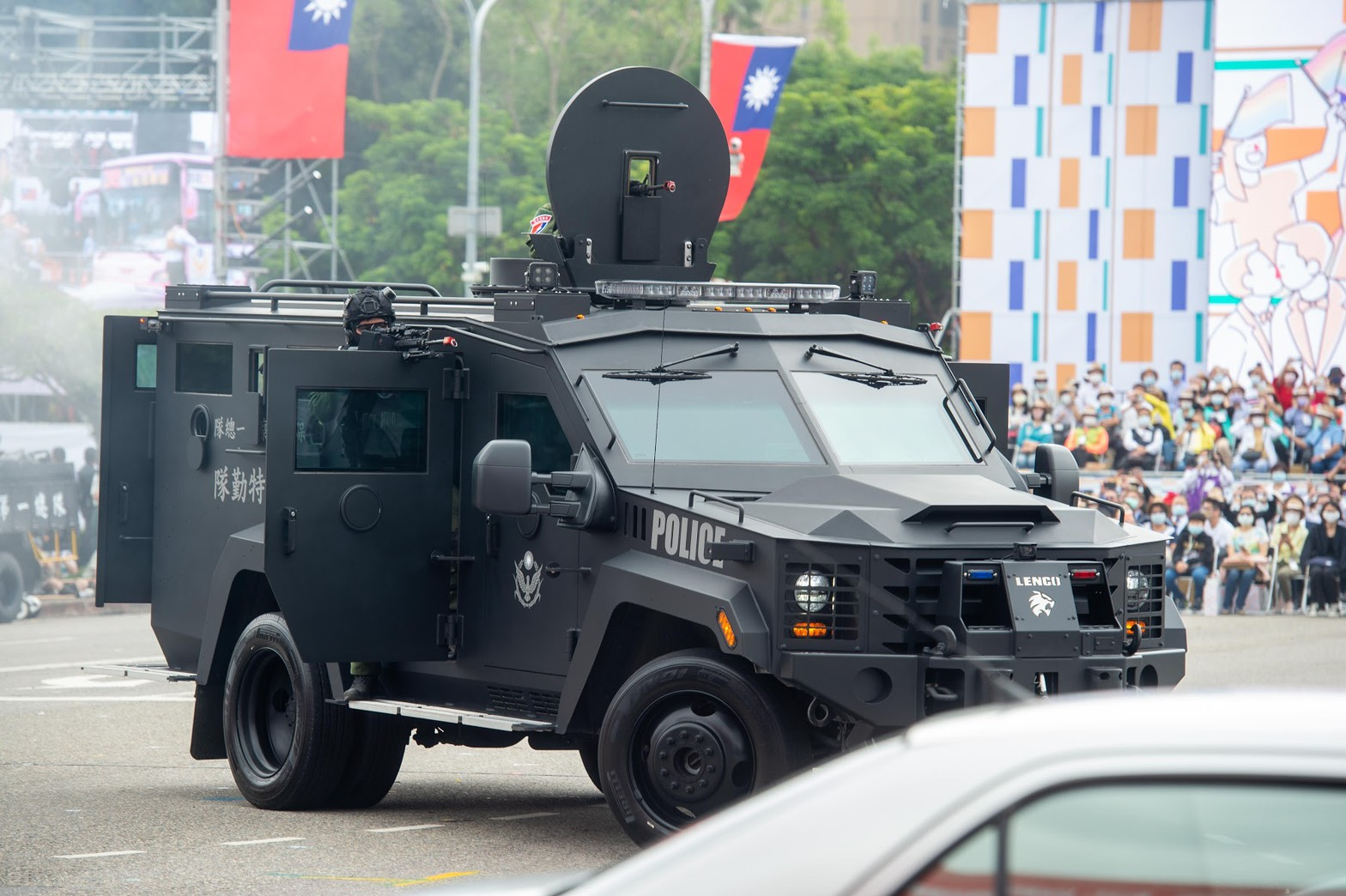
Lenco BearCat

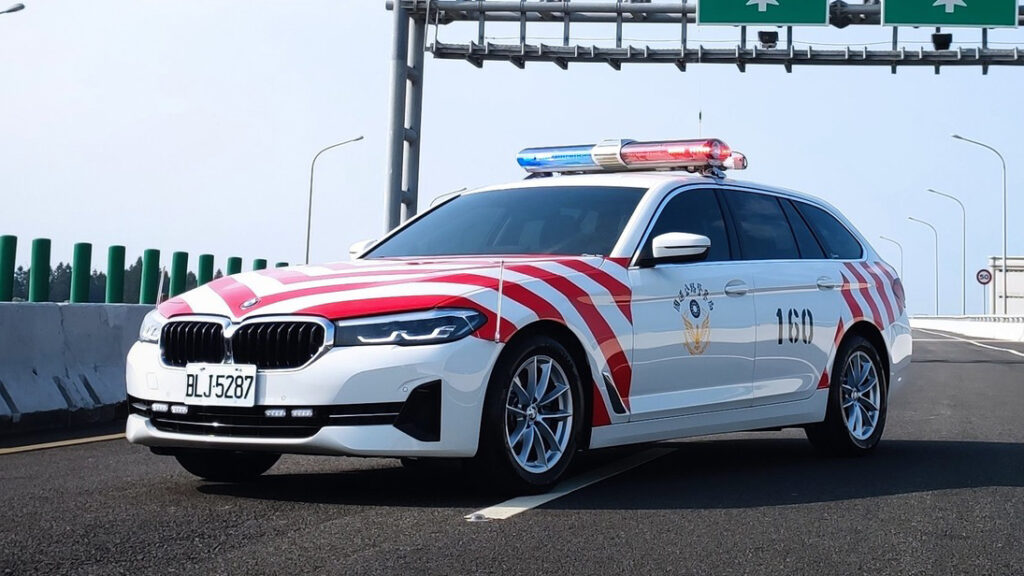

Police vehicles in Taiwan are used by the National Police Agency to enforce the law, maintain public and social order, and deal with crime in the country. Many different types of vehicles are used depending on the duties of the police force.

== Vehicles ==
- Audi A6
- BMW 5 Series
- BMW X3
- BMW R1250RT
- BMW R1300RT
- Ford Kuga
- Ford Mondeo (fourth generation)
- Ford F-150
- Hino Ranger
- Honda CR-V
- Hyundai Tucson
- Infiniti Q50
- Iveco Daily
- Kia Carnival
- Lenco BearCat
- Luxgen M7
- Luxgen U6
- Luxgen S5
- Mitsubishi Outlander
- Mitsubishi Grunder
- Nissan Teana
- Patriot3 MARS
- Tesla Model 3
- Toyota Camry
- Toyota Crown
- Toyota Coaster
- Toyota RAV4
- Toyota Corolla Cross
- Volkswagen Tiguan
- Volkswagen Transporter (T6)
- Volvo XC60
- Volvo S90
- Volvo XC90
- Yamaha FJR1300P

== See also ==
- Republic of China Military Police
