= Code 3 =

Code 3 may refer to:

- Code 3 Collectibles, a scale model company
- Code 3 Response, a response mode for emergency vehicles
- Code 3 Public Safety Equipment, Inc. a model emergency lights
- Code-3 temporal pattern, a distinct evacuation tone pattern used primarily in fire alarms
- Code 3 (film), a 2025 film starring Rainn Wilson
- Code 3 (TV series), 1957 TV series produced at Hal Roach Studios
- Code 3 in sailing: see spinnaker
- Code 3, a documentary TV series following firefighters, hosted by Gil Gerard
