= Road Users' Code =

Hong Kong government publication

- Cover of 2020 edition
- Author: Transport Department
- Language: English, Traditional Chinese
- Subject: Transportation
- Publisher: Government Logistics Department
- Publication date: June 1987
- Publication place: Hong Kong
- Media type: Print, digital

Road Users' Code (Chinese: 道路使用者守則; Jyutping: dou6 lou6 si2 jung6 ze2 sau2 zak1) is a road users' guide published by the Transport Department of Hong Kong.

== Overview ==
There is not a single law governing the rules of the road like other jurisdictions. Licensing and road maintenance are under the purview of the Transport Department and the Highways Department respectively.

There are several motoring laws in Hong Kong:

- Motor Vehicles Insurance (Third Party Risks) Ordinance – governs third party insurance for drivers
- Road Traffic (Driving-Offence Points) Ordinance – sets up a point system for breach of rules of the road
- Road Traffic Ordinance – regulates road traffic and use of vehicles

== History ==
The Road Users' Code was preceded by a publication called the Highway Code, which was targeted almost exclusively toward motorists. In 1984, the Road Traffic (Amendment) Bill was announced. Among the provisions of the bill was to rename the Highway Code as the Road Users' Code in order to reflect that the updated publication was to provide guidance to all road users.

Secretary for transport Michael Leung formally announced the new booklet in April 1987. It was first published in June 1987. Updated editions were published in May 2000 and June 2020.

== See also ==
- The Highway Code, the British equivalent
- Malta's The Highway Code, the Maltese equivalent
- Driver's manual, equivalence in the United States
