= The Highway Code (Malta) =

Official road user guide for Malta

The Highway Code is the official road user guide for Malta.

== Background ==
The Highway Code is published by the Maltese government and is their official road user guide. The guide contains road use rules for pedestrians, cyclists and automobile users. The manual is available in both English and Maltese and as a printed publication and online.

== Influence on road safety ==
A motoring commentator for the Maltese The Sunday Times argued that roads might be safer in Malta if a higher priority is given to enforcing the rules in The Highway Code and that higher penalties for contravention should be dispensed.

== See also ==
- The Highway Code, the British equivalent
- Road Users' Code, the Hong Kong equivalent
- Driver's manual, equivalent in the United States
