= Rules of the Road (Ireland) =

Official road user guide for Ireland

The Rules of the Road (Irish: Rialacha an Bhóthair) is the official road user guide for Ireland published by the Road Safety Authority. It is available in English and Irish.

== See also ==
- The Highway Code
- Driver's education
