= The Highway Code =

Official rules for UK road users

The Highway Code, first edition 1931 (Djvu file: click on the image to browse though the pages.)

The Highway Code is the official set of information and guidance for road users in the United Kingdom, its objective being to promote the safe and efficient use of the road network. The Code applies to all road users, including pedestrians, horse riders and cyclists, as well as motorcyclists and other drivers. It gives information on traffic signs, traffic signals, road markings and legal requirements for different road users, and has annexes on vehicle maintenance, licence requirements, documentation, penalties, and vehicle security.

Though The Highway Code itself is not legally binding, many of its rules directly reflect the law, and a failure to observe any of its provisions may be used as evidence in legal proceedings (for example to establish liability in relation to offences such as careless and dangerous driving).

The Highway Code was first published in 1931, and is regularly updated. It is prepared by the Department for Transport and the Driver and Vehicle Standards Agency, and is published by The Stationery Office in both electronic form and as a printed book.

The 17th edition (2022) introduced some significant changes. In particular, a new "hierarchy of road users" classifies road users according to their risk of injury in the event of a collision, with the most vulnerable (for example, pedestrians and cyclists) at the top.

The Great Britain version, available in English and Welsh, applies to England, Scotland and Wales; however, region-specific signs such as driver location signs in England and bilingual signs in Scotland and Wales are not covered. There is also a Northern Ireland version, available in English and Irish.

== History ==
The Departmental Committee on the Regulation of Motor Vehicles announced in 1920 that "a compulsory and uniform code of signals for all road vehicles is to be brought into operation". Drivers in London had evolved a system for signalling their intentions to turn right or stop, using their arm, and this was seen to be of such benefit that it should be required and standardised as a code of behaviour across the country. The code allowed the driver to use either their own arm or a dummy arm – which had obvious benefits in wet weather for drivers with the luxury of an enclosed cab, or for drivers using left-hand-drive vehicles, as in imported American cars. The intention to bring in the compulsory code was delayed and in successive years the code was expanded including whip signals for horse-drawn vehicles, and signals made by policemen controlling junctions.

In 1923 a booklet costing one penny was published by His Majesty's Stationery Office and approved by the Home Office and Scottish Office. Entitled Traffic Signals to be used by the Police and Drivers of Vehicles, this booklet arose from discussions between the Police and The Automobile Association. In subsequent years, in addition to being promoted by the automobile associations, the code was publicised using posters by the National Safety First Association (which still continues this work, having been renamed the Royal Society for the Prevention of Accidents in 1936).

The formal introduction of The Highway Code was one of the provisions of the wide-reaching Road Traffic Act 1930. Costing one penny, the first edition of the code was published on 14 April 1931. It contained 21 pages of advice, including the arm signals to be given by drivers and police officers controlling traffic. The second edition, considerably expanded, appeared in 1934, and included illustrated road signs for the first time. During its preparation the Ministry of Transport consulted with the Pedestrians' Association.

Further major updates followed after the Second World War, references to trams, for example, being removed after the 1954 version. (Blackpool was for decades the only place in the UK with a tram system. Tramway rules returned to the Code in 1994, after the first modern tram systems in Britain had opened). Motorway driving was first included in the fifth edition. The sixth edition, in 1968, used photographs as well as drawings, and updated the illustrations of road signs to take the new 'continental' designs into account. The 70-page 1978 edition introduced the Green Cross Code for pedestrians, and orange badges for unskilled drivers. The book's layout was changed to a taller format in the 1990s. An electronic Highway Code app followed in 2012. Following public consultations in 2020, a new "hierarchy of road users" was incorporated into the 17th edition (2022), classifying road users according to their risk (for example of them being injured) in the event of a collision, with the most vulnerable at the top.

== Hierarchy of road users (2022 edition) ==
The "hierarchy of road users", according to The Official Highway Code, is a concept that places those road users most at risk in the event of a collision at the top of the hierarchy. Three special rules are provided which cover the concept:

=== Rule H1 ===
Sets out the principle that those in charge of vehicles that can cause the greatest harm in the event of a collision bear the greatest responsibility to take care and reduce the danger they pose to others. The principle applies most strongly to drivers of large goods and passenger vehicles, vans/minibuses, cars/taxis and motorcycles. Cyclists, horse riders and drivers of horse drawn vehicles likewise have a responsibility to reduce danger to pedestrians.

=== Rule H2 – for drivers (including motorcyclists), horse drawn vehicles, horse riders and cyclists ===
At a junction, other road users should give way to pedestrians crossing or waiting to cross a road into which or from which they are turning.

Pedestrians have priority on zebra crossings and on shared use cycle tracks. Only pedestrians (including wheelchair and mobility scooter users) may use the pavement. Pedestrians may use any part of the road and may use cycle tracks as well as the pavement, unless there are signs to the contrary.

=== Rule H3 – for drivers (including motorcyclists) ===
Drivers should not cut across cyclists, horse riders or horse drawn vehicles going ahead when they are turning into or out of a junction or changing direction or lane (just as they would not turn across the path of another motor vehicle). The code says "do not turn at a junction if to do so would cause the [more vulnerable road user] going straight ahead to stop or swerve". This applies not only when the more vulnerable road user is on the road, but also when they are in a cycle lane or on a cycle track.

== Legal aspects ==
Certain rules in The Highway Code are legal requirements, and are identified by the words 'must' or 'must not', presented in bold red block capitals. In these cases, the rules also include references to the corresponding legislation. Offenders may be cautioned, given penalty points on their driving licences, fined, banned from driving or imprisoned, depending on the severity of the offence. Although failure to comply with the other rules will not, in itself, cause a person to be prosecuted, The Highway Code may be used in court under the Road Traffic Act 1988 to establish liability or determine who is at fault in a road traffic incident. These include advisory rules with the wording 'should' and 'should not' or 'do' or 'do not'. The latest official printed version of the Highway Code is the one in force at any time, but in legal proceedings the version current at the time of the incident applies.

The Road Traffic Act 1988 states:

A failure on the part of a person to observe a provision of The Highway Code shall not of itself render that person liable to criminal proceedings of any kind but any such failure may in any proceedings (whether civil or criminal...) be relied upon by any party to the proceedings as tending to establish or negative any liability which is in question in those proceedings.

== Access ==
The currently applicable Highway Code for England, Scotland, and Wales is available to read online at the Highway Code website, with links to download as free PDF eBook, app, and audio book. A printed version is widely available for purchase.

== See also ==
- Driver's manual, the United States and Canada equivalent of the Highway Code
- Road Users' Code, the Hong Kong equivalent of The Highway Code
- Malta's The Highway Code, the Maltese Highway Code
- Ireland's Rules of the Road, the Irish equivalent of the Highway Code.
- Manual on Uniform Traffic Control Devices
- Road surface marking
- Road marking machine
- Traffic Signs Regulations and General Directions
- Vienna Convention on Road Traffic
- Vienna Convention on Road Signs and Signals
