= 2021 Ohio's 11th congressional district special election =

Ohio's 11th congressional district special election
- November 2, 2021

Ohio's 11th congressional district
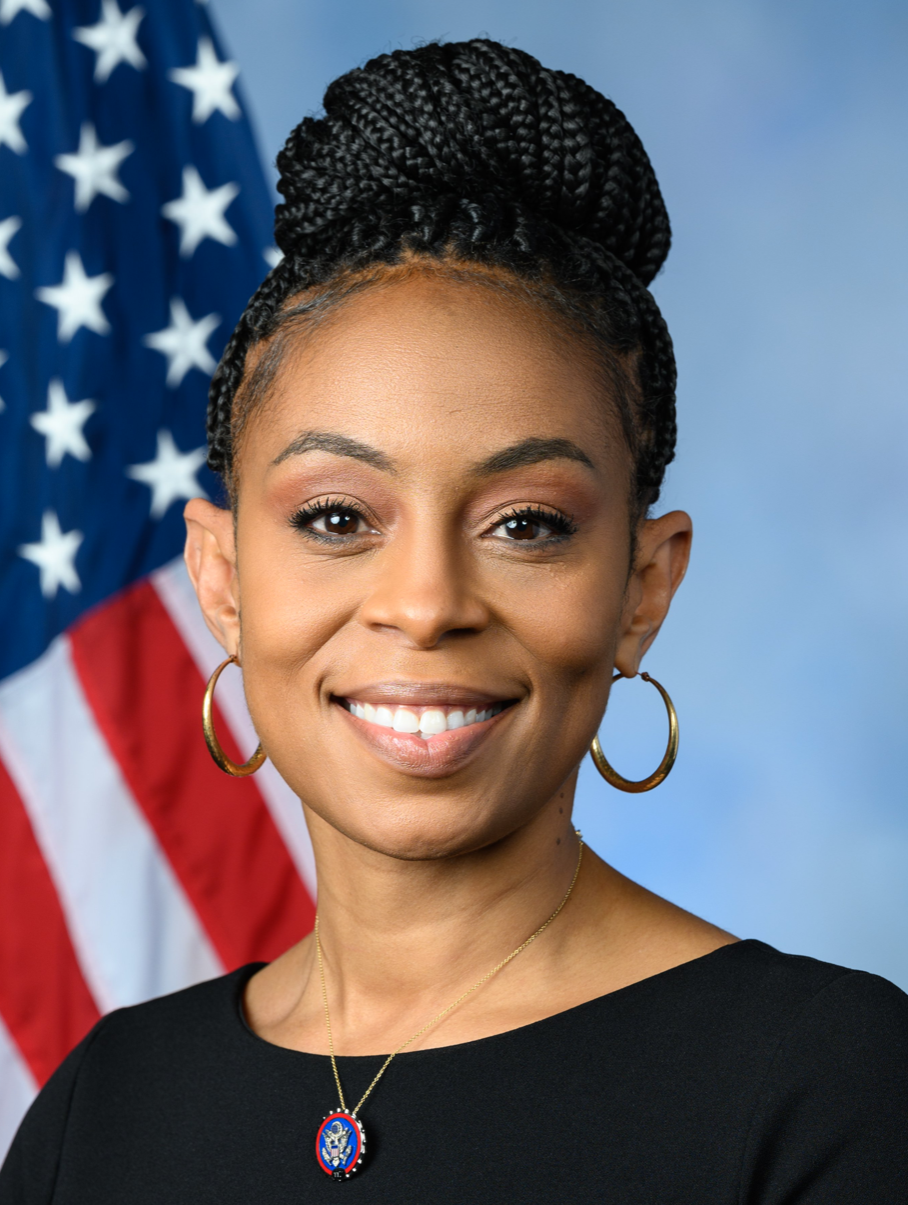

Nominee	Shontel Brown	Laverne Gore
Party	Democratic	Republican
Popular vote	82,913	22,198
Percentage	78.9%	21.1%
- County results Brown: 60–70% 80–90%
U.S. Representative before election
Marcia Fudge
Democratic
Elected U.S. Representative
Shontel Brown
Democratic

On March 10, 2021, Marcia Fudge resigned her seat in the United States House of Representatives, after being confirmed by the United States Senate to serve as the Secretary of Housing and Urban Development in the Biden administration. Governor Mike DeWine set the primary date for August 3, concurrent with the special election in Ohio's 15th congressional district. The general election was on November 2. Shontel Brown won both the hotly contested Democratic primary, which drew national attention, and the general election, and was sworn in on November 4.

== Democratic primary ==
By early January 2021, former state senator Nina Turner, Cuyahoga County Council member Shontel Brown, and former Cleveland City Council member Jeff Johnson had all announced their candidacies. Turner was perceived as the progressive candidate in the race, while Brown was considered a moderate. Johnson portrayed himself as ideologically between the other two.

Turner filed paperwork to register a committee by the name of "Nina for Us" with the Federal Election Commission (FEC) on the day the Fudge appointment was announced. On December 10, Fudge's nomination was made official; five days later, Turner announced her candidacy in the special election for Ohio's 11th congressional district.

By mid-February 2021, former state senator Shirley Smith and former state representative John E. Barnes Jr. had entered the primary. Turner and Brown were considered the front-runners at this point, with Turner having raised $650,000 to Brown's $40,000. Upon entering the race, Smith attacked Turner for her ties to left-wing activist groups, and Brown for her ties to the Cuyahoga County "machine", while Barnes touted his legislative experience. On February 19, The Plain Dealer and Cleveland.com Editorial Team called on Brown to resign as Cuyahoga County Democratic Party chair in order to avoid conflicts of interest, and to "restart the process of amassing local endorsements from scratch" as a candidate and not a "powerful local chair".

By the time the United States Senate confirmed Fudge as HUD secretary, two more candidates had entered the race: Bryan Flannery, a former state representative, and Tariq Shabazz, who ran in the Democratic primary for OH-11 in 2020. The candidates in the Democratic primary have a noted geographical divide. The 11th district, which is heavily gerrymandered, is split roughly evenly between Cuyahoga and Summit Counties. However, six of the seven major candidates were from Cuyahoga County, Flannery being the only exception. Flannery withdrew from the race in early May, citing family issues.

By mid-June, Seth Richardson of The Plain Dealer considered Turner the sole front-runner, as expected support for Brown's campaign had not materialized. Turner was often called the "frontrunner" in local and national media. In late June, several senior and more moderate Democrats publicly announced their support for Brown; these endorsements were noted as resulting in large fundraising hauls for Turner, but they caused Brown to rise substantially in the polls, though her fundraising totals remained behind Turner's. In July, Brown was referred to the Ohio Ethics Commission over allegations made in an article in The Intercept that she had used her influence to award government contracts to campaign donors. Brown faked the endorsement of Garfield Heights Councilman Michael Dudley, who actually endorsed Turner.

In the days leading up to the special election, many national figures came to last-minute campaign events. Figures such as House Majority Whip Jim Clyburn campaigned for Brown, while figures such as Senator Bernie Sanders, a 2016 and 2020 contender for the Democratic nomination for president of the United States, campaigned for Turner.

David Weigel of The Washington Post said Brown's campaign was trying to make the special election "a referendum on supporting the Biden administration" but that Brown's lack of substance on what she would do in Congress "has become a sticking point in the primary". Due to the fragmented nature of the field, it was considered unlikely that any candidate would get 50% of the vote, which resulted in heavy campaigning in Summit County, home to Akron, as the traditionally overlooked pool of voters there were considered a potential swing factor.

Brown won the August 3 primary with 50.2% of the vote.

=== Campaign financing ===
By mid-February 2021, Turner had raised $650,000 to Brown's $40,000. Final direct campaign donations in August totaled $2.1 million for Brown and $4.5 million for Turner, according to FEC filings. No other candidate raised more than $60,000.

By July, the Democratic Majority for Israel PAC had contributed over $660,000 in advertising attacking Turner and supporting Brown, a figure that rose to over $2 million by the end of the primary, $1 million of which was for television advertisements. The Jewish Democratic Council of America spent five figures targeting Jewish voters in support of Brown. As of late July, the Working Families Party pledged to spend at least $150,000 for Turner via its Super PAC. By the end of the campaign, outside advertisement spending supporting Turner or opposing Brown totaled $900,000 and outside advertisement spending supporting Brown or opposing Turner totaled $2.9 million. NPR reported that the Turner team's fundraising was approximately $5.7 million, while Brown's campaign was about $2.6 million.

=== Analysis ===
Exit polls showed that Brown won some of the areas with a higher proportion of Black and Jewish voters while Turner won some with more white voters, a minority in the district. In general, Brown fared better in wealthier areas, while Turner won more with below-average incomes. Brown won more areas in the suburbs, while Turner won more in the city of Cleveland. A press release from the Brown campaign says that their internal polling also showed that Turner's loss could be attributed in part to her comparison of voting for then-candidate Joe Biden to "eating half a bowl of shit".

According to HuffPost, Turner's campaign spent too much on consultants rather than television advertising, and did not "adequately respond to the inevitable attacks on Turner’s history of conflict with key figures in the Democratic Party".

In the broader context of 2021 Democratic primaries, the race was one example of the success of the Democratic Party's institutional, moderate faction against its left-wing factions. In this race Brown represented the successful institutional faction, while Turner represented the leftist faction. Representative Hakeem Jeffries described this institutional success as a marker Democratic voters' disinterest in the more strident ideological rhetoric of the leftist faction. Moderate party leaders publicly exulted at this success. Biden advisors saw the moderate wins as proof of its success in 2020 and as proof of the importance of moderate voters. Members of the left disputed this characterization following the primary season, noting primary election successes like the mayoral campaigns in Buffalo and Pittsburgh and the success of progressive incumbents like Philadelphia district attorney Larry Krasner.

=== Candidates ===
==== Nominee ====
- Shontel Brown, Cuyahoga County Council member (2015–2021), Chair of the Cuyahoga County Democratic Party

==== Eliminated in primary ====
- John E. Barnes Jr., former state representative for the 12th district (1999–2002, 2011–2018)
- Jeff Johnson, former state senator for the 10th district (1990–1998), former Cleveland City Council member (1984–1990, 2014–2018), candidate for Mayor of Cleveland in 2017
- Tariq Shabazz, U.S. Navy veteran, candidate for OH-11 in 2020
- Shirley Smith, former state senator for the 21st district (2007–2014), former Assistant Minority Leader of the Ohio Senate (2008–2014), former state representative for the 8th district (1999–2003) and the 10th district (2003–2006)
- Nina Turner, president of Our Revolution (2017–present), former state senator for the 25th district (2008–2014), former Minority Whip of the Ohio Senate (2013–2015), former Cleveland City Councillor (2006–2008), national co-chair of the 2016 and 2020 Bernie Sanders presidential campaigns, nominee for Ohio Secretary of State in 2014

==== Other declared candidates ====
- Martin Alexander, lawyer
- James Jerome Bell, author and perennial candidate
- Seth J. Corey, oncologist
- Will Knight, businessman
- Pamela Pinkney, preacher
- Isaac Powell, former city council candidate
- Lateek Shabazz, businessman and teacher

==== Withdrawn ====
- Bryan Flannery, former state representative for the 17th district (1999–2002) and candidate for governor of Ohio in 2006

==== Declined ====
- Blaine Griffin, Cleveland City Council member for Ward 6 (endorsed Turner)
- Stephanie Howse, state representative (endorsed Turner)
- Sandra Williams, state senator (endorsed Turner)

=== Debates ===
2021 Ohio's 11th congressional district democratic primary debates
No.	Date & Time	Host	Moderator	Link	Participants						
Key: P Participant A Absent N Non-invitee W Withdrawn											
Key: P Participant A Absent N Non-invitee W Withdrawn					John E. Barnes Jr.	Shontel Brown	Jeff Johnson	Tariq Shabazz	Shirley Smith	Nina Turner	Others
1	May 23, 2021	East Cleveland Public Library	Wayne Dawson; Brandon King; Korean Stevenson	Video	P	A (Note: Brown sent a surrogate, Jasmine Lattery, to debate in her place.)	P	P	P	A	Bell; Pinkney
2	June 22, 2021	City Club of Cleveland	M.L. Schultze		P	P	P	P	P	P	Corey; Knight

=== Endorsements ===
Shontel Brown

Executive officials

- Hillary Clinton, 67th United States Secretary of State (2009–2013), U.S. Senator from New York (2001–2009), First Lady of the United States (1993–2001), 2016 Democratic nominee for president of the United States

U.S. Representatives

- Pete Aguilar, U.S. Representative from CA-31 (2015–present), Vice Chair of the House Democratic Caucus (2021–present)
- Joyce Beatty, U.S. Representative from OH-03 (2013–present), Chair of the Congressional Black Caucus (2021–present)
- Troy Carter, U.S. Representative from LA-02 (2021–present)
- Jim Clyburn, U.S. Representative from SC-06 (1993–present), House Majority Whip (2019–present)
- Ted Deutch, U.S. Representative from FL-22 (2011–present)
- Josh Gottheimer, U.S. Representative from NJ-05 (2017–present)
- Ron Klein, former U.S. Representative from FL-22 (2007–2011)
- Gregory Meeks, U.S. Representative from NY-05 (2013–present)
- Stacey Plaskett, Delegate to the United States House of Representatives from the U.S. Virgin Islands (2015–present)
- Brad Schneider, U.S. Representative from IL-10 (2017–present)
- Bennie Thompson, U.S. Representative from MS-02 (1993–present)
- David Trone, U.S. Representative from MD-06 (2019–present)
- Marc Veasey, U.S. Representative from TX-33

Statewide officials

- Richard Cordray, director of the Consumer Financial Protection Bureau (2012–2017); Ohio Attorney General (2009–2011); Ohio State Treasurer (2007–2009)
- Ted Strickland, former governor of Ohio (2007–2011)

State legislators

- Kent Smith, Ohio State Representative from District 8 (2015–present)
- Terrence Upchurch, Ohio State Representative from District 10 (2019–present)
- Casey Weinstein, Ohio State Representative from District 37 (2019–present)

Local officials

- Armond Budish, Cuyahoga County Executive (2015–present)
- Dan Horrigan, mayor of Akron, Ohio (2016–present)
- Don Plusquellic, former mayor of Akron, Ohio (1987–2015)
- Bill Mason, former Cuyahoga County Prosecutor
- Brad Sellers, mayor of Warrensville Heights, Ohio

Labor unions

- American Federation of Teachers / Ohio Federation of Teachers
- Boilermakers Local 744
- International Brotherhood of Electrical Workers Local 38
- International Association of Sheet Metal, Air, Rail and Transportation Workers
- Bricklayers Local 5
- International Union of Painters and Allied Trades
- National Association of Letter Carriers Ohio State Chapter
- Laborers Local 130
- Pipe Fitters Local 20
- Teamsters Local 436
- UAW Regional 2B

Organizations

- Congressional Black Caucus PAC
- Democratic Majority for Israel
- Jewish Democratic Council of America
- New Democrat Coalition Action Fund
- Pro-Israel America

Notable individuals

- Yvette Nicole Brown, actress
Bryan Flannery (withdrawn)

Organizations

- Democrats for Life of America
Nina Turner

Executive officials

- Robert Reich, United States Secretary of Labor (1993–1997)

U.S. Senators

- Ed Markey, U.S. Senator from Massachusetts (2013–present)
- Bernie Sanders, U.S. Senator from Vermont (2007–present) and candidate for president in 2016 and 2020

U.S. Representatives

- Jamaal Bowman, U.S. Representative from NY-16 (2021–2025)
- Cori Bush, U.S. Representative from MO-01 (2021–present)
- Pramila Jayapal, U.S. Representative from WA-07 (2017–present), Chair of the Congressional Progressive Caucus (2019–present)
- Mondaire Jones, U.S. Representative from NY-17 (2021–2023)
- Ro Khanna, U.S. Representative from CA-17 (2017–present)
- Andy Levin, U.S. Representative from MI-09 (2019–present)
- Ted Lieu, U.S. Representative from CA-33 (2015–present)
- Alexandria Ocasio-Cortez, U.S. Representative from NY-14 (2019–present)
- Ilhan Omar, U.S. Representative from MN-05 (2019–present)
- Mark Pocan, U.S. Representative from WI-02 (2013–present)
- Katie Porter, U.S. Representative from CA-45 (2019–2025)
- Ayanna Pressley, U.S. Representative from MA-07 (2019–present)
- Jamie Raskin, U.S. Representative from MD-08 (2017–present)
- Rashida Tlaib, U.S. Representative from MI-13 (2019–present)

Statewide officials

- Keith Ellison, Attorney General of Minnesota (2019–present); U.S. Representative from MN-05 (2007–2019)

State legislators

- Nickie Antonio, Ohio State Senator from District 23 (2019–present)
- Charles Booker, Kentucky State Representative (2019–2021) and candidate for U.S. Senate in 2020 and 2022
- Janine Boyd, Ohio State Representative from District 9 (2015–present)
- Juanita Brent, Ohio State Representative from District 12 (2019–present)
- Nick Celebrezze, Ohio State Representative from District 15 (2012–2019)
- Tavia Galonski, Ohio State Representative from District 35 (2017–present)
- Stephanie Howse, Ohio State Representative from District 11 (2015–present)
- Eric Kearney, Ohio State Senator from District 9 (2005–2014)
- C.J. Prentiss, Ohio State Senator from District 8 (1999–2007); Minority Leader of the Ohio Senate (2005–2006)
- Phil Robinson, Ohio State Representative from District 6 (2019–present)
- Bakari Sellers, South Carolina State Representative (2006–2014)
- Mike Skindell, Ohio State Representative from District 13 (2019–present; 2003–2010); Ohio State Senator from District 23 (2011–2018)
- Sandra Williams, Ohio State Senator from District 21 (2015–present)
- Kenny Yuko, Ohio State Senator from District 25 (2015–present); Minority Leader of the Ohio Senate (2017–present)

Municipal officials

- Carmen Yulín Cruz, Mayor of San Juan, Puerto Rico (2013–2020)
- Frank Jackson, Mayor of Cleveland, Ohio (2006–present)
- Ben Jealous, president and CEO of the NAACP (2008–2013) and 2018 nominee for Governor of Maryland
- Melissa Mark-Viverito, Speaker of the New York City Council (2014–2017) and Councilwoman from District 8 (2006–2017)
- Rhine McLin, Mayor of Dayton, Ohio (2002–2010)
- David Pepper, Chair of the Ohio Democratic Party (2015–2020); former Cincinnati city councilor
- Yvette Simpson, city council member of Cincinnati (2011–2018) and CEO of Democracy for America (2019–present)
- Randall Woodfin, Mayor of Birmingham, Alabama (2017–present)

Labor unions

- Amalgamated Transit Union
- Bakery, Confectionery, Tobacco Workers and Grain Millers' International Union Local 19
- Retail, Wholesale and Department Store Union
- SEIU Local 1
- SEIU Local 1199
- National Nurses United

Newspapers and publications

- Blavity News
- The Plain Dealer (Democratic primary only)

Organizations

- Akron Democratic Socialists of America
- Brand New Congress
- Cuyahoga County Progressive Caucus
- Center for Biological Diversity Action Fund
- Climate Hawks Vote
- Cleveland Stonewall Democrats
- Congressional Progressive Caucus PAC
- Democracy for America
- Friends of the Earth Action
- International Association of Black Professional Firefighters
- Justice Democrats
- MoveOn
- Our Revolution
- Peace Action
- Progressive Democrats of America
- Sierra Club
- Sunrise Movement
- The Gravel Institute
- The People for Bernie Sanders
- Women's March
- Working Families Party
- YDSA at IUSB

Notable individuals

- Krystal Ball, journalist and political pundit; former host of Rising on The Hill
- Charlamagne tha God, radio presenter, television personality, and author
- Ben Cohen, businessman, activist, and philanthropist
- Sean Combs, rapper, record producer, record executive, and entrepreneur
- Danny Glover, actor, film director, and political activist
- John Iadarola, talk show host, YouTube personality, and political pundit
- Ana Kasparian, political commentator and journalist
- Killer Mike, rapper, songwriter, actor, and activist
- Shaun King, writer, civil rights activist, and co-founder of Real Justice PAC
- Kyle Kulinski, political commentator, YouTuber, co-founder of Justice Democrats and Secular Talk host
- Chuck Rocha, political consultant, Democratic Party strategist, former union organizer, and president of Solidarity Strategies
- Aida Rodriguez, comedian
- Mark Ruffalo, actor and producer
- Susan Sarandon, actress and activist
- Sam Seder, actor, political commentator, and host of The Majority Report with Sam Seder
- Norman Solomon, activist and founder of RootsAction.org
- Paula Jean Swearengin, environmental activist; candidate for U.S. Senate from West Virginia in 2018 and Democratic nominee in 2020
- Cenk Uygur, former candidate for California's 2020 25th congressional district special election, journalist, creator of The Young Turks, and co-founder of Justice Democrats
- Jeffrey P. Weaver, political strategist
- Cornel West, philosopher, social critic and activist
- Marianne Williamson, spiritual leader, author, and political activist; candidate for president in 2020
- Andrew Yang, entrepreneur and philanthropist; candidate for president in 2020; candidate for Mayor of New York City in 2021

=== Polling ===
Graphical summary

Poll source	Date(s) administered	Sample size (Note: Key: A – all adults RV – registered voters LV – likely voters V – unclear)	Margin of error	John E. Barnes Jr.	Shontel Brown	Jeff Johnson	Tariq Shabazz	Shirley Smith	Nina Turner	Other	Undecided
Data for Progress (D) (Note: This poll was conducted for an IE and released after the primary)	July 30 – August 1, 2021	341 (LV)	± 5.3%	–	46%	2%	–	–	43%	3%	7%
The Mellman Group (D) (Note: This poll was sponsored by DMFI PAC, which had previously endorsed Brown)	July 13–17, 2021	400 (LV)	± 4.9%	–	36%	–	–	–	41%	5%	18%
Data for Progress (D)	July 13–14, 2021	318 (LV)	± 5.5%	–	46%	–	–	–	45%	9%	–
TargetPoint (R)	July 8–10, 2021	300 (LV)	± 5.7%	1%	33%	3%	1%	–	33%	4% (Note: "One of the other candidates" with 3%, Will Knight with 1%)	25%
Normington Petts (D) (Note: This poll was sponsored by Brown's campaign)	July 6–8, 2021	400 (LV)	± 4.9%	–	36%	–	–	–	43%	7%	14%
The Mellman Group (D)	June 2021	400 (LV)	± 4.9%	–	26%	–	–	–	50%	6%	18%
Tulchin Research (D) (Note: This poll was sponsored by Turner's campaign)	May 20–26, 2021	600 (LV)	± 4.0%	2%	15%	4%	2%	3%	50%	5% (Note: "Other" with 3%, Seth Corey and Pamela Pinkney with 1%, Isaac Powell with 0%)	21%
The Mellman Group (D)	April 2021	400 (LV)	± 4.9%	–	19%	–	–	–	42%	11%	29%
Normington Petts (D)	April 2021	400 (LV)	± 4.9%	–	10%	–	–	–	42%	19%	29%

=== Results ===
Results by precinct, municipality, and county
Brown
- 40–50%
- 50–60%
- 60–70%
- 70–80%
- 80–90%
- >90%
Turner
- 40–50%
- 50–60%
- 60–70%
- 70–80%
- 80–90%
- >90%
Tie
- 40–50%
No votes

Democratic primary results
Party	Candidate	Votes	%
Democratic	Shontel Brown	38,505	50.11%
Democratic	Nina Turner	34,239	44.56%
Democratic	Jeff Johnson	1,388	1.81%
Democratic	John E. Barnes Jr.	801	1.04%
Democratic	Shirley Smith	599	0.78%
Democratic	Seth J. Corey	493	0.64%
Democratic	Pamela M. Pinkney	184	0.24%
Democratic	Will Knight	182	0.24%
Democratic	Tariq Shabazz	134	0.17%
Democratic	Martin Alexander	105	0.14%
Democratic	James Jerome Bell	101	0.13%
Democratic	Lateek Shabazz	61	0.08%
Democratic	Isaac Powell	52	0.07%
Total votes		76,844	100.00%

== Republican primary ==
=== Candidates ===
==== Nominee ====
- Laverne Gore, businesswoman, nominee for OH-11 in 2020

==== Eliminated in primary ====
- Felicia Washington Ross, Democratic candidate for Ohio's 12th state house district in 2020

=== Endorsements ===
Laverne Gore

Newspapers and publications

- The Plain Dealer (Republican primary only)

Organizations

- Ohio Republican Party

=== Results ===
Results by county Gore: Gore—70–80%

Republican primary results
Party	Candidate	Votes	%
Republican	Laverne Gore	4,009	74.05%
Republican	Felicia Washington Ross	1,405	25.95%
Total votes		5,414	100.00%

== General election ==
=== Predictions ===
Source	Ranking	As of
The Cook Political Report	Solid D	August 4, 2021
Inside Elections	Solid D	October 27, 2021
Sabato's Crystal Ball	Safe D	August 4, 2021

=== Endorsements ===
Shontel Brown (D)

Executive officials

- Joe Biden, President of the United States (2021–present), Vice President of the United States (2009–2017) and U.S. Senator from Delaware (1973–2009)
- Hillary Clinton, 67th United States Secretary of State (2009–2013), U.S. Senator from New York (2001–2009), First Lady of the United States (1993–2001), 2016 Democratic nominee for president of the United States
- Bill Kristol, Chief of Staff to the Vice President (1989–1993) (Independent)

U.S. Representatives

- Pete Aguilar, U.S. Representative from CA-31 (2015–present), Vice Chair of the House Democratic Caucus (2021–present)
- Joyce Beatty, U.S. Representative from OH-03 (2013–present), Chair of the Congressional Black Caucus (2021–present)
- Troy Carter, U.S. Representative from LA-02 (2021–present)
- Jim Clyburn, U.S. Representative from SC-06 (1993–present), House Majority Whip (2019–present)
- Ted Deutch, U.S. Representative from FL-22 (2011–present)
- Josh Gottheimer, U.S. Representative from NJ-05 (2017–present)
- Hakeem Jeffries, U.S. Representative from NY-8 (2013–present)
- Ron Klein, former U.S. Representative from FL-22 (2007–2011)
- Gregory Meeks, U.S. Representative from NY-05 (2013–present)
- Stacey Plaskett, Delegate to the United States House of Representatives from the U.S. Virgin Islands (2015–present)
- Brad Schneider, U.S. Representative from IL-10 (2017–present)
- Bennie Thompson, U.S. Representative from MS-02 (1993–present)
- David Trone, U.S. Representative from MD-06 (2019–present)
- Marc Veasey, U.S. Representative from TX-33 (2013–present)
- Debbie Wasserman Schultz, U.S. Representative from FL-23 (2013–present), FL-20 (2005–2013) and Chair of the Democratic National Committee (2011–2016)

Statewide officials

- Richard Cordray, director of the Consumer Financial Protection Bureau (2012–2017); Ohio Attorney General (2009–2011); Ohio State Treasurer (2007–2009)
- Ted Strickland, former governor of Ohio (2007–2011)

State legislators

- Kent Smith, Ohio State Representative from District 8 (2015–present)
- Terrence Upchurch, Ohio State Representative from District 10 (2019–present)
- Casey Weinstein, Ohio State Representative from District 37 (2019–present)

Local officials

- Armond Budish, Cuyahoga County Executive (2015–present)
- Dan Horrigan, mayor of Akron, Ohio (2016–present)
- Don Plusquellic, former mayor of Akron, Ohio (1987–2015)
- Bill Mason, former Cuyahoga County Prosecutor
- Brad Sellers, mayor of Warrensville Heights, Ohio

Labor unions

- American Federation of Teachers / Ohio Federation of Teachers
- Boilermakers Local 744
- International Brotherhood of Electrical Workers Local 38
- International Association of Sheet Metal, Air, Rail and Transportation Workers
- Bricklayers Local 5
- International Union of Painters and Allied Trades
- National Association of Letter Carriers Ohio State Chapter
- Laborers Local 130
- Pipe Fitters Local 20
- Teamsters Local 436
- UAW Regional 2B

Organizations

- Congressional Black Caucus PAC
- Democratic Majority for Israel
- Giffords
- Human Rights Campaign
- Jewish Democratic Council of America
- Mom's Demand Action
- New Democrat Coalition Action Fund
- Pro-Israel America

Notable individuals

- Yvette Nicole Brown, actress
Laverne Gore (R)

Organizations

- Ohio Republican Party

=== Results ===
2021 Ohio's 11th congressional district special election
Party	Candidate	Votes	%	±%
Democratic	Shontel Brown	82,913	78.88%	–1.17
Republican	Laverne Gore	22,198	21.12%	+1.17
Total votes		105,111	100.00%	
Democratic hold				

By county

County	Shontel Brown Democratic		Laverne Gore Republican		Margin		Total votes
County	#	%	#	%	#	%	Total votes
Cuyahoga (part)	76,386	80.27	18,774	19.73	57,612	60.54	95,160
Summit (part)	5,250	62.46	3,155	37.54	2,095	24.93	8,405
Totals	81,636	78.83	21,929	21.17	59,707	57.65	103,565

== Notes ==
Partisan clients
