= 2011 Akron mayoral election =

- November 8, 2011
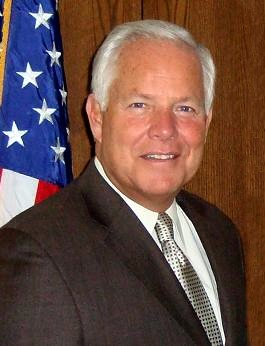

Nominee	Don Plusquellic	Jennifer Hensal
Party	Democratic	Republican
Popular vote	32,493	13,605
Percentage	70.49%	29.51%
Mayor before election
Don Plusquellic
Democratic
Elected Mayor
Don Plusquellic
Democratic

The 2011 Akron mayoral election was held on November 8, 2011. Incumbent Democratic Mayor Don Plusquellic ran for re-election to a seventh term, after defeating a recall attempt in 2009. He was challenged in the Democratic primary by City Councilman Michael Williams, and won by a wide margin. In the general election, he faced Republican Jennifer Hensal, an attorney. Plusquellic defeated Hensal in a landslide, winning re-election with 70 percent of the vote.

Plusquellic would not serve out his full term, however. He announced on May 8, 2015, that he would not seek an eighth term in 2015 and that he would leave office early on May 31, 2015, citing among other reasons unfavorable press coverage from the Akron Beacon Journal.

== Democratic primary ==
=== Candidates ===
- Don Plusquellic, incumbent Mayor
- Mike Williams, City Councilman
- Janice Davis, bank employee, student

=== Primary results ===
Democratic primary results
Party	Candidate	Votes	%
Democratic	Don Plusquellic (inc.)	12,625	54.70%
Democratic	Michael Williams	9,984	43.26%
Democratic	Janice Davis	471	2.04%
Total votes		23,080	100.00%

== Republican primary ==
=== Candidates ===
- Jennifer Hensal, attorney
- Katie Marie Wilkins

=== Primary results ===
Republican primary results
Party	Candidate	Votes	%
Republican	Jennifer Hensal	1,057	65.37%
Republican	Katie Marie Wilkins	560	34.63%
Total votes		1,617	100.00%

== General election ==
=== Results ===
2011 Akron mayoral election
Party	Candidate	Votes	%
Democratic	Don Plusquellic (inc.)	32,493	70.49%
Republican	Jennifer Hensal	13,605	29.51%
Total votes		46,098	100.00%
Democratic hold			
