= 2015 Akron mayoral election =

- November 3, 2015
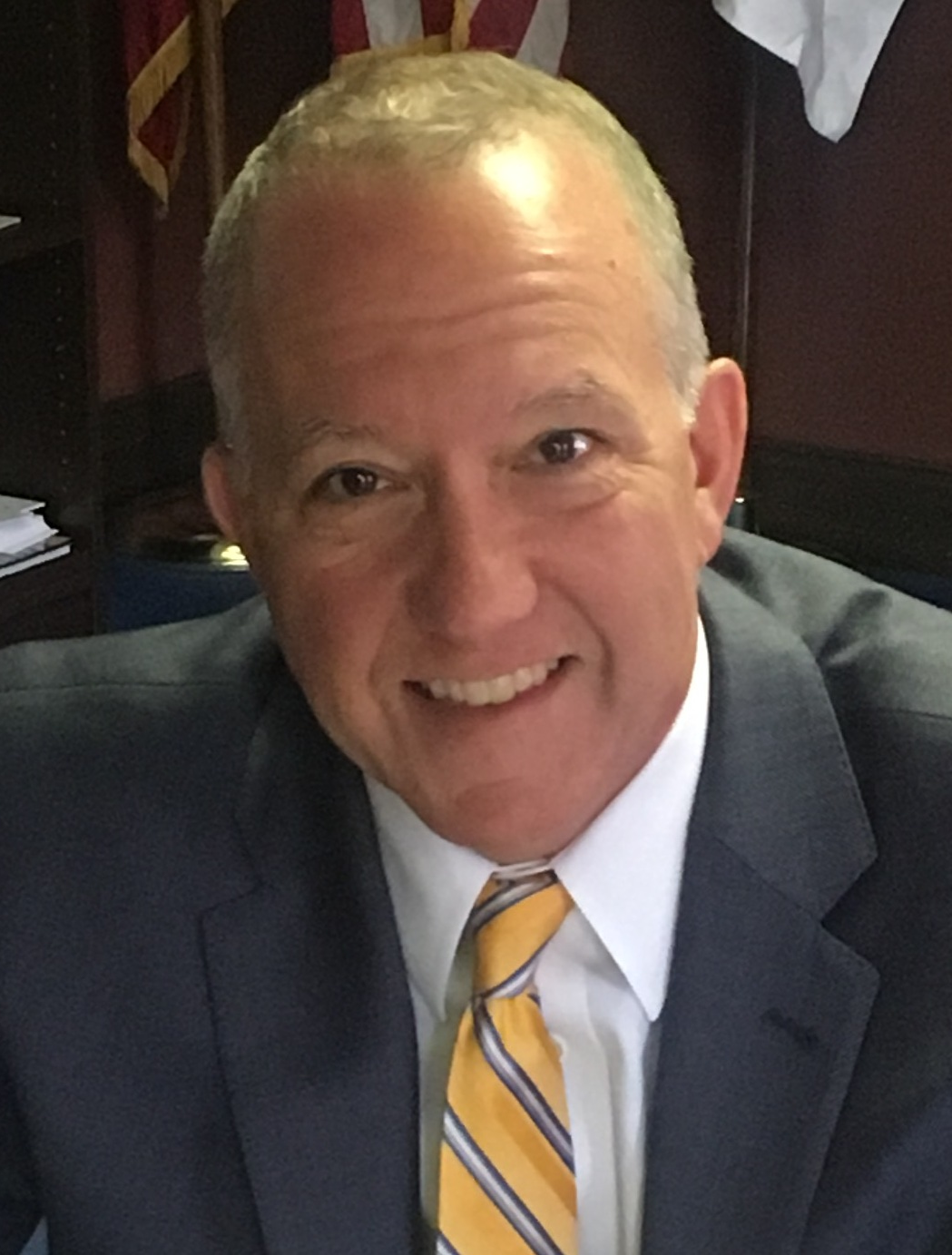

Nominee	Dan Horrigan	Eddie Sipplen
Party	Democratic	Republican
Popular vote	29,436	9,732
Percentage	72.33%	29.51%
Mayor before election
Jeff Fusco (interim)
Democratic
Elected Mayor
Dan Horrigan
Democratic

The 2015 Akron mayoral election was held on November 3, 2015. On May 8, 2015, Mayor Don Plusquellic announced that he would not seek an eighth term and that he would resign from office on May 31, which elevated City Council President Garry Moneypenny to serve as interim Mayor.

Moneypenny planned to run for a full term in the election, but shortly after he took office, he admitted to inappropriate contact with a female city employee and announced that he would not run, and ultimately resigned from office. Newly elected City Council President Jeff Fusco then became interim Mayor, and declined to run for a full term.

Dan Horrigan, the County Clerk of Courts, won the Democratic primary over City Councilman Mike Williams, Plusquellic's 2011 primary challenger, and advanced to the general election. He was opposed by Republican nominee Eddie Sipplen, a criminal defense attorney, and independent William Melver, a retired engineer. Horrigan won the general election in a landslide, receiving 72 percent of the vote to Sipplen's 24 percent and Melver's 4 percent.

== Democratic primary ==
=== Candidates ===
- Dan Horrigan, County Clerk of Courts
- Mike Williams, City Councilman, 2011 candidate for Mayor

==== Dropped out ====
- Frank Comunale, County Councilman
- Tom Sawyer, State Senator, former Congressman, former Mayor of Akron

==== Declined ====
- Jeff Fusco, interim Mayor
- Garry Moneypenny, former interim Mayor
- Don Plusquellic, former Mayor
- Ilene Shapiro, County Council President

=== Primary results ===
Democratic primary results
Party	Candidate	Votes	%
Democratic	Dan Horrigan	10,647	56.83%
Democratic	Mike Williams	8,088	43.17%
Total votes		18,735	100.00%

== Republican primary ==
=== Candidates ===
- Eddie Sipplen, defense attorney

=== Primary results ===
Republican primary results
Party	Candidate	Votes	%
Republican	Eddie Sipplen	1,227	100.00%
Total votes		1,227	100.00%

== General election ==
=== Candidates ===
- Dan Horrigan, County Clerk of Courts (Democratic)
- Eddie Sipplen, defense attorney (Republican)
- William Melver, retired engineer (independent)

=== Results ===
2015 Akron mayoral election
Party	Candidate	Votes	%
Democratic	Dan Horrigan	29,436	72.33%
Republican	Eddie Sipplen	9,732	23.91%
Independent	William Melver	1,528	3.75%
Total votes		40,696	100.00%
Democratic hold			
