= 2019 Akron mayoral election =

- November 5, 2019
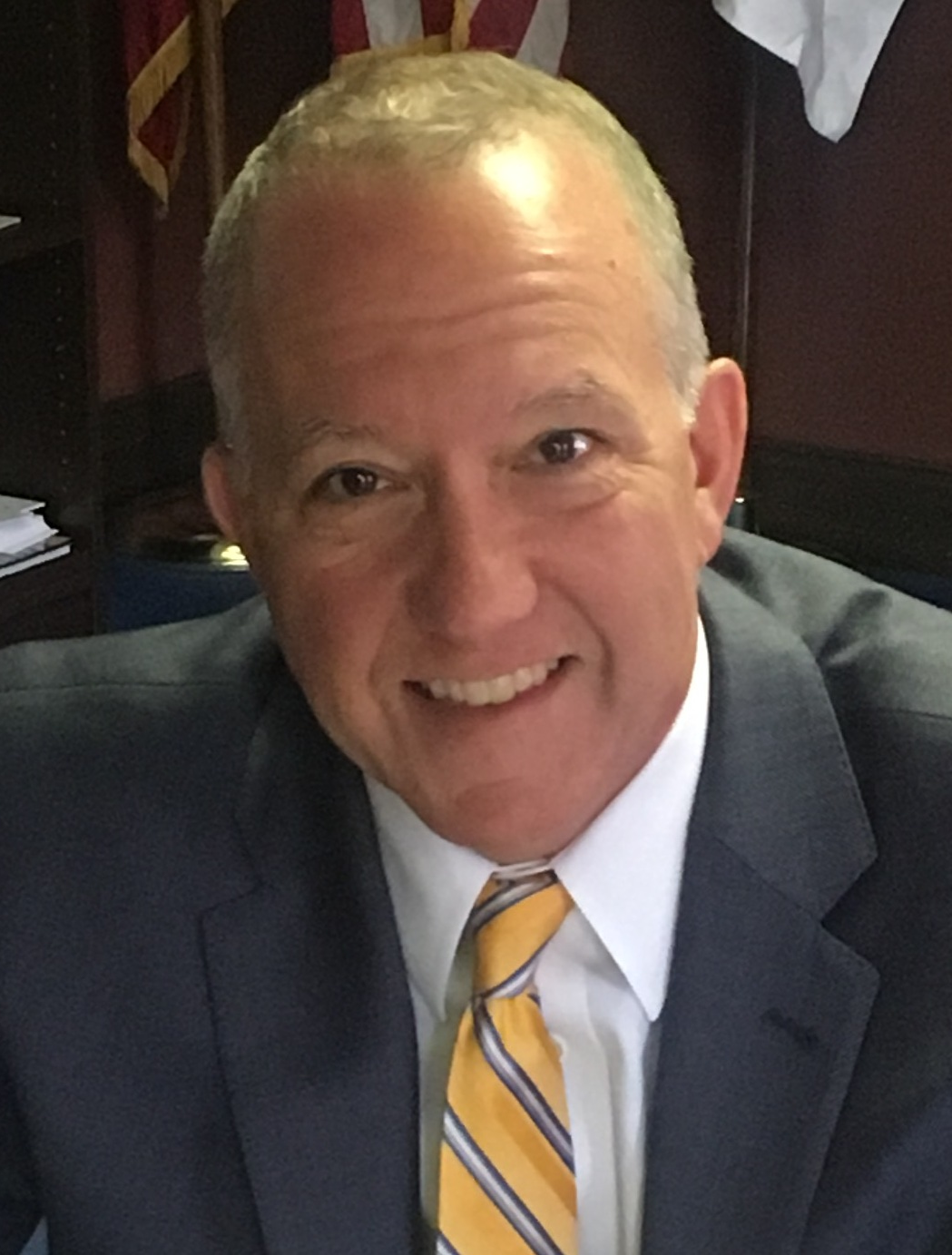

Nominee	Dan Horrigan	Josh Sines
Party	Democratic	Republican
Popular vote	20,254	5,921
Percentage	77.38%	22.62%
Mayor before election
Dan Horrigan
Democratic
Elected Mayor
Dan Horrigan
Democratic

The 2019 Akron mayoral election was held on November 3, 2019. Incumbent Democratic Mayor Dan Horrigan ran for re-election to a second term. He defeated pastor Greg Harrison in the Democratic primary, and faced Republican nominee Josh Sines, a perennial candidate, in the general election. Though former mayor Don Plusquellic considered running against Horrigan as an independent, he ultimately declined to do so. Horrigan defeated Sines in a landslide, receiving 77 percent of the vote.

== Democratic primary ==
=== Candidates ===
- Dan Horrigan, incumbent Mayor
- Greg Harrison, pastor, retired police officer

=== Primary results ===
Democratic primary results
Party	Candidate	Votes	%
Democratic	Daniel Horrigan (inc.)	10,993	78.50%
Democratic	Greg Harrison	3,011	21.50%
Total votes		14,004	100.00%

== Republican primary ==
=== Candidates ===
- Josh Sines, perennial candidate, martial arts and wrestling announcer

=== Primary results ===
Republican primary results
Party	Candidate	Votes	%
Republican	Josh Sines	1,702	100.00%
Total votes		1,702	100.00%

== General election ==
=== Results ===
2019 Akron mayoral election
Party	Candidate	Votes	%
Democratic	Dan Horrigan (inc.)	20,254	77.38%
Republican	Josh Sines	5,921	22.62%
Total votes		26,175	100.00%
Democratic hold			
