= 2008 Summit County, Ohio Executive election =

- November 4, 2008

Nominee	Russ Pry	Jim Laria
Party	Democratic	Republican
Popular vote	150,292	96,489
Percentage	60.90%	39.10%
County Executive before election
Russ Pry
Democratic
Elected County Executive
Russ Pry
Democratic

The 2008 Summit County, Ohio Executive election took place on November 4, 2008. County Executive James McCarthy, who won the 2004 election, resigned from office in 2007, and Russ Pry, the chairman of the county Democratic Party, was selected to replace him. Pry served out the remainder of McCarthy's term and ran for a full term in the 2008 election.

Pry was challenged in the Democratic primary by former Akron City Councilman Joe Finley, who had recently lost the 2007 election for Mayor of Akron, and campaigned on a reform platform. Pry won renomination with 59 percent of the vote, and advanced to the general election, where he faced Republican nominee Jim Laria, the Akron Municipal Court Clerk. He won re-election in a landslide, receiving 61 percent of the vote to Laria's 39 percent.

== Democratic primary ==
=== Candidates ===
- Russ Pry, incumbent County Executive
- Joe Finley, former Akron City Councilman, 2007 candidate for Mayor of Akron

=== Campaign ===
Pry announced on October 24, 2007, that he would seek a second term as County Executive. He campaigned on his accomplishments in office, including negotiating with Goodyear Tire to construct a new worldwide headquarters in the city. Finley, meanwhile, who narrowly lost the Akron mayoral election several months earlier, argued that voters in the area wanted reform. He criticized Pry as too closely connected to the local political establishment, and campaigned against "bossism." Pry, meanwhile, distanced himself from McCarthy, who was personally popular but had a contentious relationship with local officeholders. Owing in large part to Pry's former role as county party chairman, he was endorsed for re-election by the Summit County Democratic Party, with the central committee voting for Pry over Finley, 154–3.

=== Results ===
Democratic primary results
Party	Candidate	Votes	%
Democratic	Russ Pry (inc.)	57,999	58.56%
Democratic	Joe Finley	41,038	41.44%
Total votes		99,037	100.00%

== Republican primary ==
=== Candidates ===
- Jim Laria, Akron Municipal Court Clerk

=== Results ===
Republican primary results
Party	Candidate	Votes	%
Republican	Jim Laria	25,316	100.00%
Total votes		25,316	100.00%

== General election ==
=== Results ===
2008 Summit County Executive election
Party	Candidate	Votes	%
Democratic	Russ Pry (inc.)	150,292	60.90%
Republican	Jim Laria	96,489	39.10%
Total votes		246,781	100.00%
Democratic hold			
