= 2023 Akron mayoral election =

- November 7, 2023
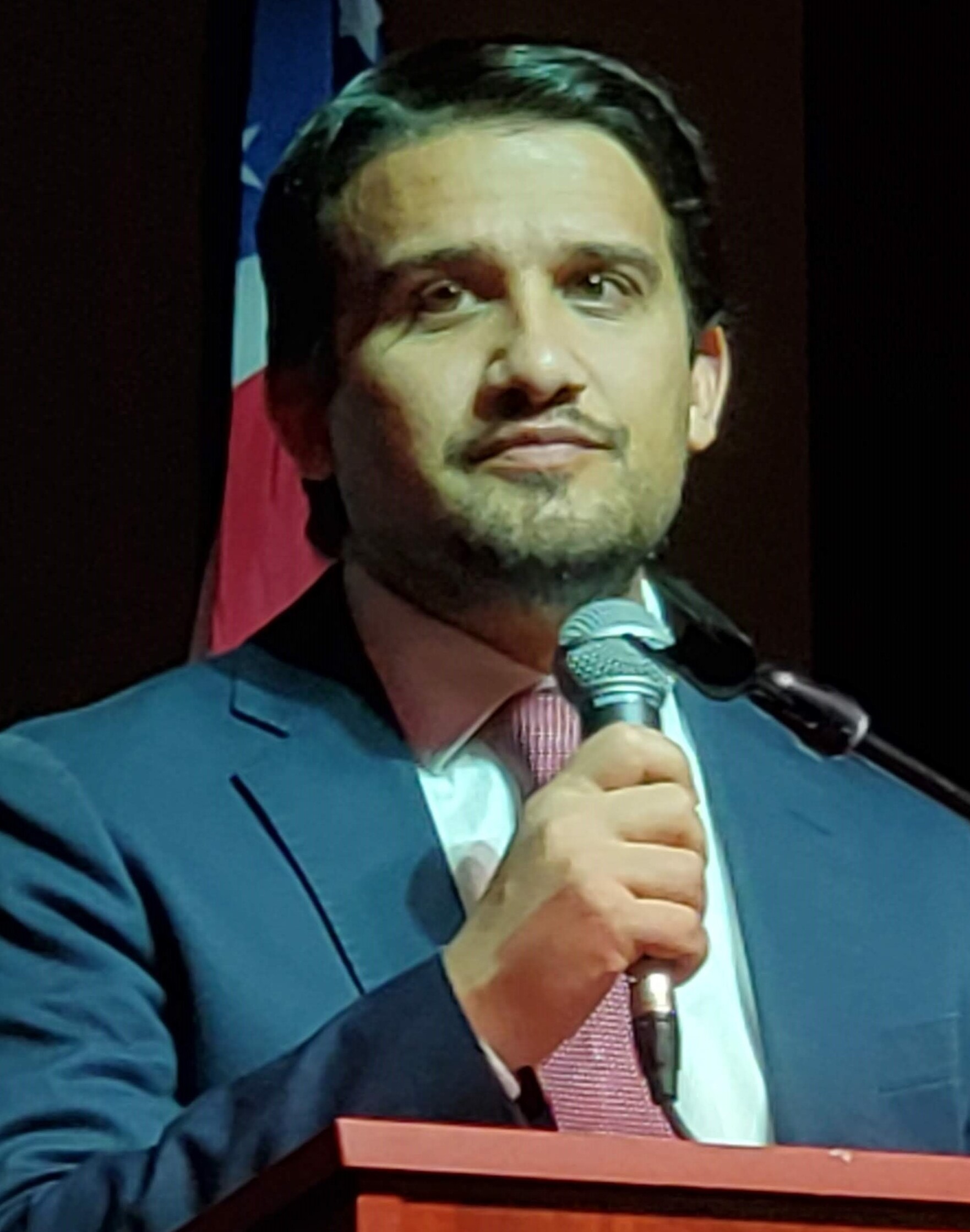
Nominee	Shammas Malik
Party	Democratic
Popular vote	36,629
Percentage	95.72%
Mayor before election
Dan Horrigan
Democratic
Elected Mayor
Shammas Malik
Democratic

The 2023 Akron mayoral election was held on November 7, 2023, to elect the mayor of Akron, Ohio. Party primaries were held on May 2. Incumbent Democratic mayor Dan Horrigan chose not to seek re-election to a third term in office.

In the Democratic primary, Ward 8 city councilor Shammas Malik won the nomination, prevailing in a field of seven candidates. Because the sole Republican candidate was disqualified, Malik was considered the presumptive next mayor of Akron. Malik was the only candidate on the ballot, as the only other person who qualified for the race was write-in candidate Nathaniel Green. He defeated Green with 95.72% of the vote.

== Democratic primary ==
=== Candidates ===
==== Nominee ====
- Shammas Malik, city councilor

==== Eliminated in primary ====
- Mark Greer, former Akron Small Business Program Manager
- Keith Mills, teacher
- Tara Mosley, city councilor and candidate for Lieutenant Governor of Ohio in 2018
- Joshua Schaffer, cellphone store manager
- Marco Sommerville, deputy mayor for intergovernmental affairs
- Jeff Wilhite, Summit County councilor

==== Declined ====
- Dan Horrigan, incumbent mayor (endorsed Sommerville)

=== Fundraising ===
Some candidates have not filed campaign finance disclosures. Those who have are listed below:

Campaign finance reports as of January 31, 2023
Candidate	Contributions	Expenditures	Cash on hand
Shammas Malik	$49,728	$56,472	$156,512
Keith Mills	$100	$0	$15,000
Tara Mosley	$9,501	$3,773	$10,506
Marco Sommerville	$63,375	$6,709	$88,375
Jeff Wilhite	$4,250	$4,590	$872

=== Endorsements ===
Shammas Malik (D)

State legislators

- Casey Weinstein, state representative from the 34th district (2019–present)

Editorial boards

- Akron Beacon Journal
- The Plain Dealer

Organizations

- Ohio Environmental Council Action Fund
- People's Action Ohio
- Sierra Club Ohio - Portage Trail Group
- University of Akron College Democrats
Tara Mosley (D)

Local officials

- Michael Williams, former at-large Akron city councilor (1997–2015)

Individuals

- Cornel West, philosopher and honorary chairman of Democratic Socialists of America

Organizations

- Black Elected Officials of Summit County - 20 TBA local officials
- Our Revolution
Marco Sommerville (D)

U.S. Representatives

- Shontel Brown, U.S. Representative from OH-11 (2021–present)
- Tom Sawyer, former U.S. Representative from OH-14 (1987–2003) and former Mayor of Akron (1984–1986)

Countywide officials

- Sherri Bevan Walsh, Summit County Prosecuting Attorney (2001–present)

Local officials

- Ginger Baylor, at-large Akron city councilor (2020–present)
- Jeff Fusco, former acting Mayor of Akron (2015) and at-large Akron City Council (1994–1997, 2010–present)
- David James, former Akron Public Schools Superintendent (2003–2021)
- Dan Horrigan, outgoing Mayor of Akron (2016–present)
- Phil Lombardo, Akron city councilor from ward 2 (2020–present)
- Brad McKitrick, Akron city councilor from ward 6 (2020–present)
- Don Plusquellic, former Mayor of Akron (1987–2015)
- Margo Sommerville, Akron city council president from ward 3 (2013–present) (his daughter)

Labor unions

- Teamsters Local 348
- Ohio AFL-CIO
- Tri-County Building & Construction Trades Council
Declined to endorse

Local officials

- Nancy Holland, Akron city councilor from ward 1 (2021–present)

=== Polling ===
Poll source	Date(s) administered	Sample size (Note: Key: A – all adults RV – registered voters LV – likely voters V – unclear)	Margin of error	Greer	Malik	Mills	Mosley	Schaffer	Somerville	Wilhite	Other	Undecided
Center for Media & Opinion Research (Note: This poll was sponsored by Akron Beacon Journal, Ideastream Public Media, and the Ray C. Bliss Institute of Applied Politics at the University of Akron)	March 27 – April 2, 2023	400 (LV)	± 5.0%	3%	18%	3%	15%	5%	17%	6%	–	33%
Center for Media & Opinion Research (Note: This poll was sponsored by The Akron Press Club, the Ohio Debate Commission, the Ray C. Bliss Institute for Applied Politics at the University of Akron, the Greater Akron Chamber of Commerce, State and Federal Communications, and the United Way of Summit & Medina)	January 17 – February 4, 2023	510 (A)	± 4.3%	–	8%	–	7%	3%	12%	4%	2%	66%

=== Results ===
2023 Akron mayoral Democratic primary
Party	Candidate	Votes	%
Democratic	Shammas Malik	8,303	43.15
Democratic	Marco Sommerville	4,944	25.70
Democratic	Tara Mosley	3,361	17.47
Democratic	Jeff Wilhite	1,549	8.05
Democratic	Mark Greer	816	4.24
Democratic	Keith Mills	143	0.74
Democratic	Joshua Schaffer	124	0.64
Total votes		19,240	100.00

== Republican primary ==
=== Disqualified ===
- Jim Isabella, former WNIR talk show host

== Independents ==
=== Certified ===
- Nathaniel Green (write-in)

== General election ==
=== Results ===
2023 Akron mayoral election
Party	Candidate	Votes	%
Democratic	Shammas Malik	36,629	95.72
Write-in		1,638	4.28
write-in	Nathaniel Green	172	0.45
Invalid or blank votes		1,466	3.83
Total votes		38,267	100
