= Vorys, Sater, Seymour and Pease =

American law firm

Vorys, Sater, Seymour and Pease LLP
- Headquarters: Columbus, Ohio
- No. of offices: 10
- No. of attorneys: ~375 (2023)
- Major practice areas: Litigation, labor and employment law, corporate law, commercial law, energy law, intellectual property law, privacy and data security law, and tax law
- Key people: Michael D. Martz, Managing Partner
- Revenue: $231 million (2023)
- Date founded: 1909
- Founder: Arthur I. Vorys, Lowry F. Sater, Augustus T. Seymour, and Edward L. Pease
- Company type: Limited liability partnership

Vorys, Sater, Seymour and Pease LLP is an international law firm based in Columbus, Ohio. With approximately 375 attorneys working out of offices in California, Ohio, Pennsylvania, Texas, Washington, D.C., London, and Berlin, the firm is among the largest 150 law firms in the United States, according to American Lawyer.

== History ==
Vorys, Sater, Seymour and Pease was founded in 1909 by Arthur I. Vorys, Lowry F. Sater, Augustus T. Seymour, and Edward L. Pease. The firm has been home to several generations of the Vorys family, many of whom have had ties to the government of Ohio as well as the federal government.

== Practice areas ==
The firm is involved in lobbying at both the federal and state levels, and also has a broad range of practices, including intellectual property, entertainment law, labor & employment law, bankruptcy and creditors' rights, health law, insurance law, tax law, corporate law, international trade law, media & telecom law, real estate, environmental law, and trusts & estates.

The firm has one subsidiary and owns one ancillary business. Vorys Advisors LLC provides business and strategic counsel to Ohio businesses in manufacturing, health care, energy, real estate, venture capital, technology, and other industries. Former Ohio Senate President Tom Niehaus serves as one of the principals for Vorys Advisors. Vorys Advisors was previously led by retired Congressman David Hobson (R-OH).

The firm's ancillary business, Precision eControl, was launched in 2022. It is an outgrowth of the firm's eControl practice, which is focused on company brand protection.

== Notable lawyers and alumni ==
- John Martin Vorys, former Congressman for Ohio's 12th congressional district
- R. Guy Cole Jr., judge on the United States Court of Appeals for the Sixth Circuit
- M. Peter McPherson, former deputy secretary of the United States Treasury and a former director of USAID
- Algenon L. Marbley, judge on United States District Court for the Southern District of Ohio, trustee for Ohio State University

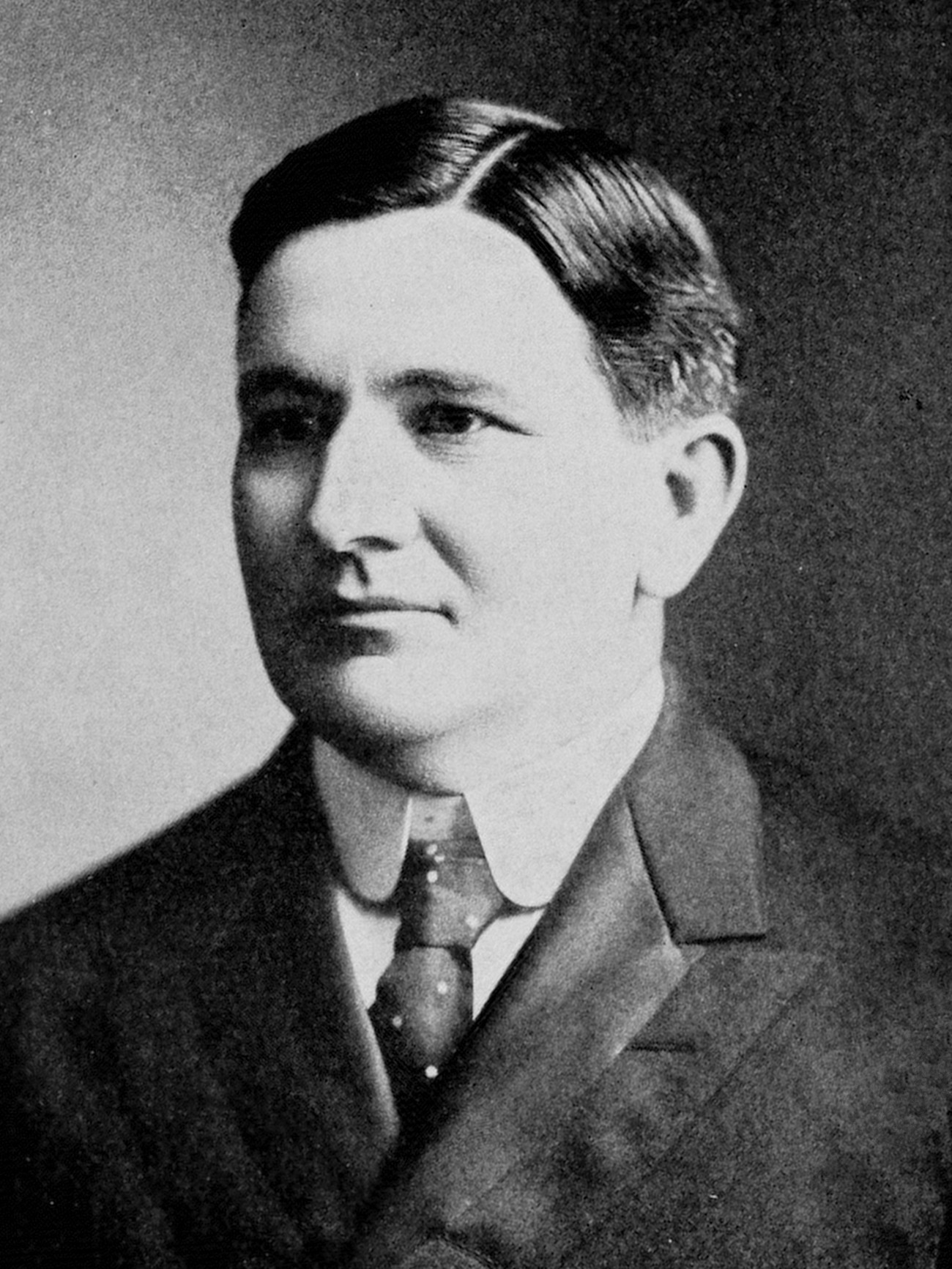
co-founder Arthur I. Vorys

- Tom McDonald, U.S. Ambassador to Zimbabwe from 1997 to 2001
- Shammas Malik, mayor of Akron, Ohio
- Matthew Barrett, casebook editor and law professor at Notre Dame Law School
- Evelyn Lundberg Stratton, former Ohio Supreme Court Justice
- Paul Manafort, American lobbyist, political consultant and convicted criminal
- John Kulewicz, Upper Arlington City Councillor and head of the firm's appellate division

Vorys Advisors

- David Hobson, retired Congressman for Ohio's 7th congressional district (no longer an advisor)
- Zack Space, former Congressman for Ohio's 18th congressional district (no longer an advisor)
- Tom Niehaus, former Ohio Senate President
- Lou Gentile, former Ohio Senate member
