= 2009 Akron mayoral recall election =

- June 23, 2009
- Recall Mayor Don Plusquellic?

Results
Choice	Votes	%
Yes	7,405	25.98%
No	21,093	74.02%
Mayor before election
Don Plusquellic
Democratic
Mayor
Don Plusquellic
Democratic

The 2009 Akron mayoral recall election took place on June 23, 2009. Mayor Don Plusquellic, who served as Mayor since 1987, faced a recall election. Supporters of the recall election argued that he had mismanaged the city. Plusquellic won the recall election in a landslide, with 74 percent of voters opposing the recall.

== Campaign ==
In early 2009, opponents of Mayor Don Plusquellic formed "Change Akron Now," an organization in support of recalling Plusquellic. Former City Councilman Warner Mendenhall, the leader of the effort, launched a website and announced that he would proceed with organizing a recall campaign if 200 people signed onto the effort online. After 275 people did so, he proceeded with the recall campaign. Mendenhall did not identify a particular issue motivating the recall election, saying, "It's an election like any other. The only difference is that Don Plusquellic will face Don Plusquellic."

On April 10, 2009, Mendenhall submitted 4,191 petitions, 3,179 of which were required to be valid to trigger the election. However, after the Summit County Board of Elections concluded that only 57 percent of the petitions were valid, Change Akron Now was given an additional twenty days to gather the remaining 508 signatures they needed. On May 6, they turned in 1,984 additional signatures.

The recall election was ultimately scheduled for June 23, and both campaigns launched. Plusquellic's supporters organized two separate committees, Citizens for Akron and Vote Against the Recall.com, which significantly outraised Change Akron Now.

Both the Akron Beacon Journal and The Plain Dealer endorsed a "no" vote on the recall. The Beacon Journal argued that the Mendenhall "orchestrated a hollow and wasteful campaign to recall the mayor." While "[a] recall should be a grave matter, an elected official engaging in misdeeds so serious that immediate removal must be sought," no adequate charges had been raised. And while "[r]ecall proponents contend the mayor embarrasses the city," the paper wrote, "the embarrassment comes in trying to explain how the city arrived in the ridiculous position of conducting a recall election of one of its most successful mayors, arguably one of the most effective leaders in the state." The Plain Dealer similarly wrote, "We can't figure out why Mayor Don Plusquellic, who has served the city admirably for 22 years, should be ousted now . . . well, besides summer must seem like a good time to stage a coup." While "[r]ecalls do have their place in the political process," the Plain Dealer argued that "they should not be used as this one is being used: to oust an elected official because a small group of people find him personally disagreeable, or happen to disagree with certain of his policies."

Plusquellic won the recall election overwhelmingly, with 74 percent of votes opposing the recall election.

== Results ==
2009 Akron mayoral recall election
Choice	Votes	%
For	7,405	25.98
Against	21,093	74.02
Total	28,498	100.00
Source: Summit County Board of Elections
