= 2007 Akron mayoral election =

- November 4, 2007
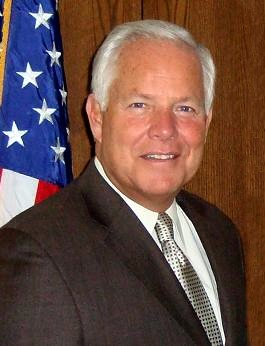
Nominee	Don Plusquellic
Party	Democratic
Popular vote	15,895
Percentage	100.00%
Mayor before election
Don Plusquellic
Democratic
Elected Mayor
Don Plusquellic
Democratic

The 2007 Akron mayoral election was held on November 6, 2007. Incumbent Democratic Mayor Don Plusquellic ran for re-election to a sixth term. He was challenged in the Democratic primary by former City Councilman Joe Finley. Plusquellic narrowly defeated Finley in the Democratic primary, winning renomination with just 53 percent of the vote. In the general election, he faced no Republican opponent and was re-elected unopposed.

== Democratic primary ==
=== Candidates ===
- Don Plusquellic, incumbent Mayor
- Joe Finley, former City Councilman

=== Campaign ===
Joe Finley, a former City Councilman who unsuccessfully ran for the Summit County Council in 2006, announced on April 14, 2007, that he would challenge Mayor Don Plusquellic in the Democratic primary, becoming lusquellic's first primary challenger since he was first elected in 1987. Finley attacked Plusquellic's "abusive" governing style, criticized him for proposing a city income tax increase, and argued that Plusquellic has "put too much effort toward" downtown "economic development projects" while "neglect[ing] the neighborhoods." Plusquellic, meanwhile, focused on his role in managing the city's transformation during his twenty years as Mayor, noting that the city has been able to "market our community in a way to be able to bring new businesses in[.]"

One month into the campaign, city voters overwhelmingly rejected a proposed ballot measure that would have increased the city income tax, which Finley framed as "something of a mandate on the mayor."

The Akron Beacon Journal "strongly recommend[ed] the re-election of Don Plusquellic," praising his "decisiveness" in making difficult decisions and noting that "[h]e still sustains the drive necessary to make the difference that he seeks and the city requires." The Beacon Journal noted that Plusquellic's "thin skin and volcanic temper are well known," which "diminishes his influence and ill serves the city," but criticized Finley for focusing on Plusquellic's shortcomings rather than laying out a plan for the city. It criticized his "shallow candidacy" and the "contradictions in his own remedies."

Plusquellic ultimately defeated Finley by a narrow margin, receiving 53 percent of the vote to Finley's 47 percent. Though Finley dominated in Ward 2, which he represented on the City Council, Plusquellic performed better in the higher-turnout wards.

=== Primary results ===
Democratic primary results
Party	Candidate	Votes	%
Democratic	Don Plusquellic (inc.)	9,998	52.88%
Democratic	Joe Finley	8,908	47.12%
Total votes		18,906	100.00%

== General election ==
=== Results ===
2007 Akron mayoral election
Party	Candidate	Votes	%
Democratic	Don Plusquellic (inc.)	15,895	100.00%
Total votes		15,895	100.00%
Democratic hold			
