= Shammas Malik =

American lawyer and politician (born 1991)

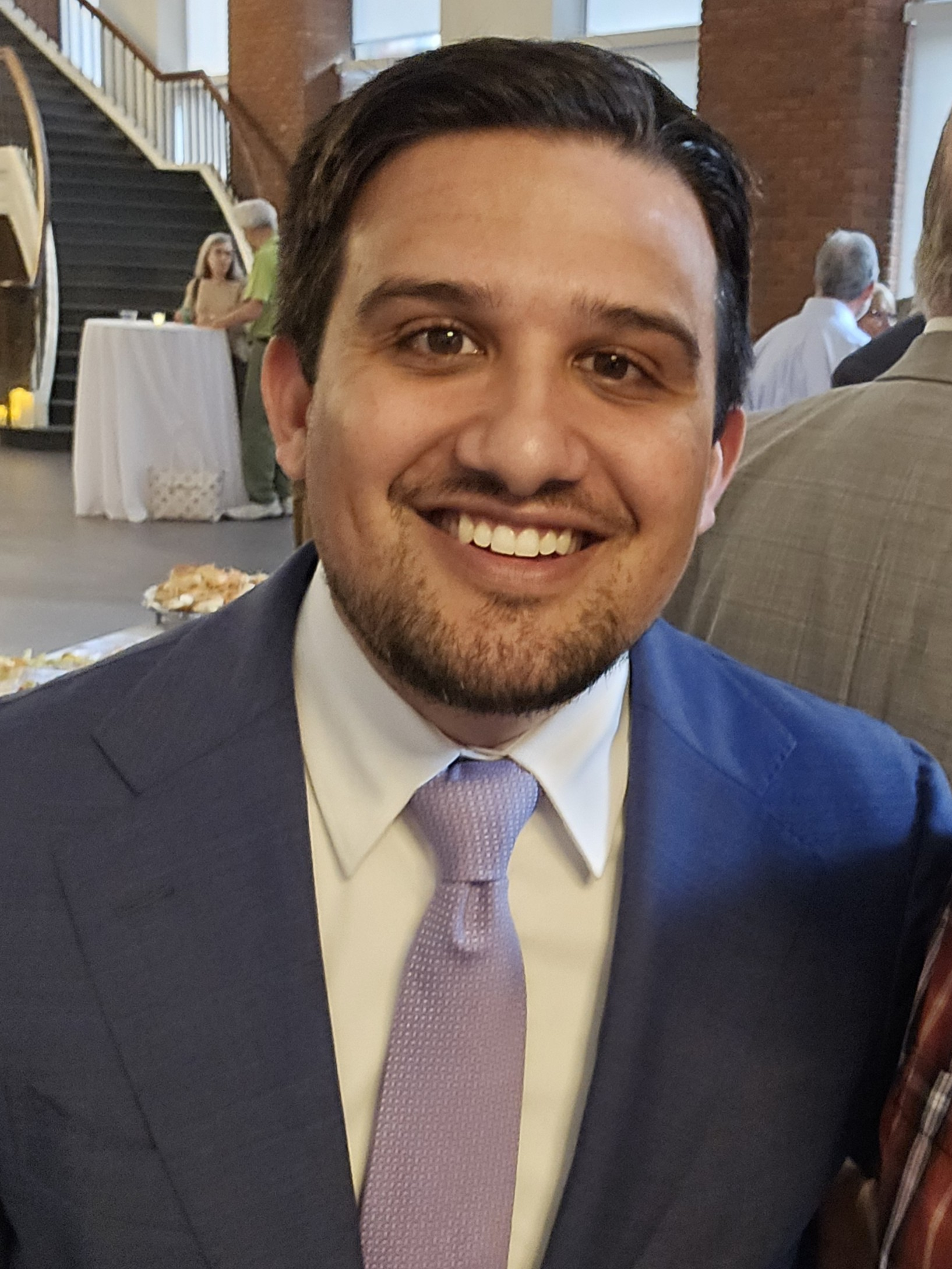
- Malik in 2025

63rd Mayor of Akron
- Incumbent
- Assumed office January 1, 2024
- Preceded by: Dan Horrigan

Member of the Akron City Council for the 8th ward
- In office January 1, 2020 – November 7, 2023

Personal details
- Born: April 10, 1991 (age 35) Akron, Ohio, U.S.
- Party: Democratic
- Spouse: Alice Malik
- Education: The Ohio State University; Harvard Law School (JD)
- Profession: Lawyer

Shammas Iqbal Qammar Malik (born April 10, 1991) is an American lawyer and politician who is currently serving as the 63rd mayor of Akron, Ohio, since January 1, 2024. Malik is a member of the Democratic Party. He previously served as the city councilor of Ward 8 from January 1, 2020, until November 7, 2023. He was an assistant director of the Akron Law Department from 2016 to 2018.

== Early life and education ==
Malik was born and raised in Ward 8, Northwest Akron, Ohio, in a Muslim family. He is of Pakistani and Irish descent. His mother, Helen Qammar, was a chemical engineering professor at the University of Akron. In 2009, he graduated from Firestone High School with an International Baccalaureate Diploma. He earned dual bachelor's degrees in political science and international studies from the Ohio State University in 2013. Malik completed a J.D., cum laude, from Harvard Law School in 2016. During law school, he completed several summer internships in Washington, D.C., including at The Pentagon.

== Career ==
=== Akron Law Department ===
From 2016 to 2018, Malik was an assistant director of the Akron Law Department. For almost a year, he worked as an associate at Vorys, Sater, Seymour and Pease.

=== Akron City Council ===
In the 2019 Akron City Council Ward 8 Democratic primary on May 7, 2019, Malik won the nomination, prevailing over Curtis T. Walker Sr. On November 5, 2019, Malik was elected, defeating Republican Brian N. Fortney. He started his term on January 1, 2020, succeeding Marilyn Keith. In the role, he advocated for a civilian oversight board for the Akron Police Department. He served on four council committees, Public Safety, Budget and Finance, Parks and Recreation, and Rules.

May 7, 2019, primary-City of Akron Ward 8 Council
Party	Candidate	Votes	%
Democratic	Shammas Malik	2,058	80.64
Democratic	Curtis T. Walker Sr.	494	19.36

November 5, 2019, general election- City of Akron Ward 8 Council
Party	Candidate	Votes	%
Democratic	Shammas Malik	3,815	73.37
Republican	Brian N. Fortney	1,385	26.63

=== 2023 mayoral election ===
In the 2023 Akron mayoral Democratic primary on May 2, 2023, Malik won the nomination, prevailing in a field of seven candidates. In May, he announced his transition team. In the 2023 Akron mayoral election on November 7, 2023, he was elected as the mayor of Akron.

May 2, 2023, primary
Party	Candidate	Votes	%
Democratic	Shammas Malik	8,303	43.15
Democratic	Marco Sommerville	4,944	25.70
Democratic	Tara Mosley	3,361	17.47
Democratic	Jeff Wilhite	1,549	8.05
Democratic	Mark Greer	816	4.24
Democratic	Keith Mills	143	0.74
Democratic	Joshua Schaffer	124	0.64
Total votes		19,240	100.00

November 7, 2023, general election
Party	Candidate	Votes	%
Democratic	Shammas Malik	12,603	96.73
Write-in		426	3.27
Total votes		13,029	100

Political offices
Preceded by Dan Horrigan	Mayor of Akron; Assumed office January 1, 2024	Incumbent
