= Pro-Israel America =

American lobbying group

- Founded: March 19, 2019 – July 31, 2023
- Legal status: Membership Organization PAC
- Members: 170,000 (July 2021)
- Executive Director: Jeff Mendelsohn
- Website: Archived website (December 2024)

Pro-Israel America (Pro-Israel America PAC) was an American advocacy and lobbying group that supported pro-Israel policies. It served as a channel for donations between members and endorsed candidates, which included incumbent members of Congress or challengers regardless of political affiliation. It was closely affiliated with the American Israel Public Affairs Committee and had a bipartisan history of endorsements. Per Federal Election Commission filings, Pro-Israel America was terminated in July 2023.

== History ==
Pro-Israel America was founded by Jeff Mendelsohn and Jonathan Missner in March 2019 and unveiled at the American Israel Public Affairs Committee Annual Policy Conference. Mendelsohn was AIPAC's outreach director and Missner was previously the managing director of national affairs at AIPAC. The group was founded to encourage more grassroots support and small dollar donations for pro-Israel political candidates.

Noah Kulwin of HuffPost wrote that:

"Creating a group like Pro-Israel America represents a huge strategic shift for AIPAC. For years, AIPAC has been able to publicly put distance between itself and the large sums of money that pro-Israel donors marshal on behalf of preferred candidates. By supporting new groups like Pro-Israel America...and giving them prime placement at its flagship conference — AIPAC is publicly linking itself to the kind of election cycle work it has long kept at arm's length."

Sludge, a 501(c)(3) anti-corruption non-profit news website founded by the Participatory Politics Foundation, called Pro-Israel America "an AIPAC-Tied Group".

== Political activity ==
=== 2020 ===
At launch, Pro-Israel America endorsed 14 Democrats and 13 Republicans. The slate included Senators Susan Collins (R-ME), Cory Gardner (R-CO), Lindsey Graham (R-SC), Jim Risch (R-ID), Ben Sasse (R-NE), Chris Coons (D-DL), Doug Jones (D-AL) and Gary Peters (D-MI); Representatives Steny Hoyer (D-MD-5), Ted Deutch (D-FL-22), Eliot Engel (D-NY-16), Josh Gottheimer (D-NJ-5), Ted Lieu (D-CA-33), Nita Lowey (D-NY-17), Grace Meng (D-NY), Stephanie Murphy (D-FL-7), Brad Schneider (D-IL-10), Brad Sherman (D-CA-30), Juan Vargas (D-CA-51), Kevin McCarthy (R-CA-23), Steve Chabot (R-OH-1), Brian Fitzpatrick (R-PA-1), Kay Granger (R-TX-12), Will Hurd (R-TX-23), Brian Mast (R-FL-18), Michael McCaul (R-TX-10) and Joe Wilson (R-SC-2).

Pro-Israel America raised $400,000 for Ilhan Omar's primary challenger, Antone Melton-Meaux. Omar won 58-38%. By July, the group had raised $2 million, amassed 150,000 members, and endorsed 52 candidates; 21 Republicans and 31 Democrats.

In a post-election impact report, Pro-Israel America reported that endorsed candidates had a 95% victory rate. According to OpenSecrets, 53% of contributions went to Democrats and 46% went to Republicans.

=== 2021 ===
Pro-Israel America endorsed Cuyahoga County Council member Shontel Brown in the Democratic primary for a 2021 special election in Ohio's 11th congressional district. Pro-Israel views were initially seen as an important factor of the race and an indicator of Democrat's views on Israel.

=== 2022 ===
In February 2022, Pro-Israel America called on liberal Zionist organization J Street PAC to drop its endorsement of Marie Newman.
