= Rocket Arena =

Arena in downtown Cleveland, Ohio, US

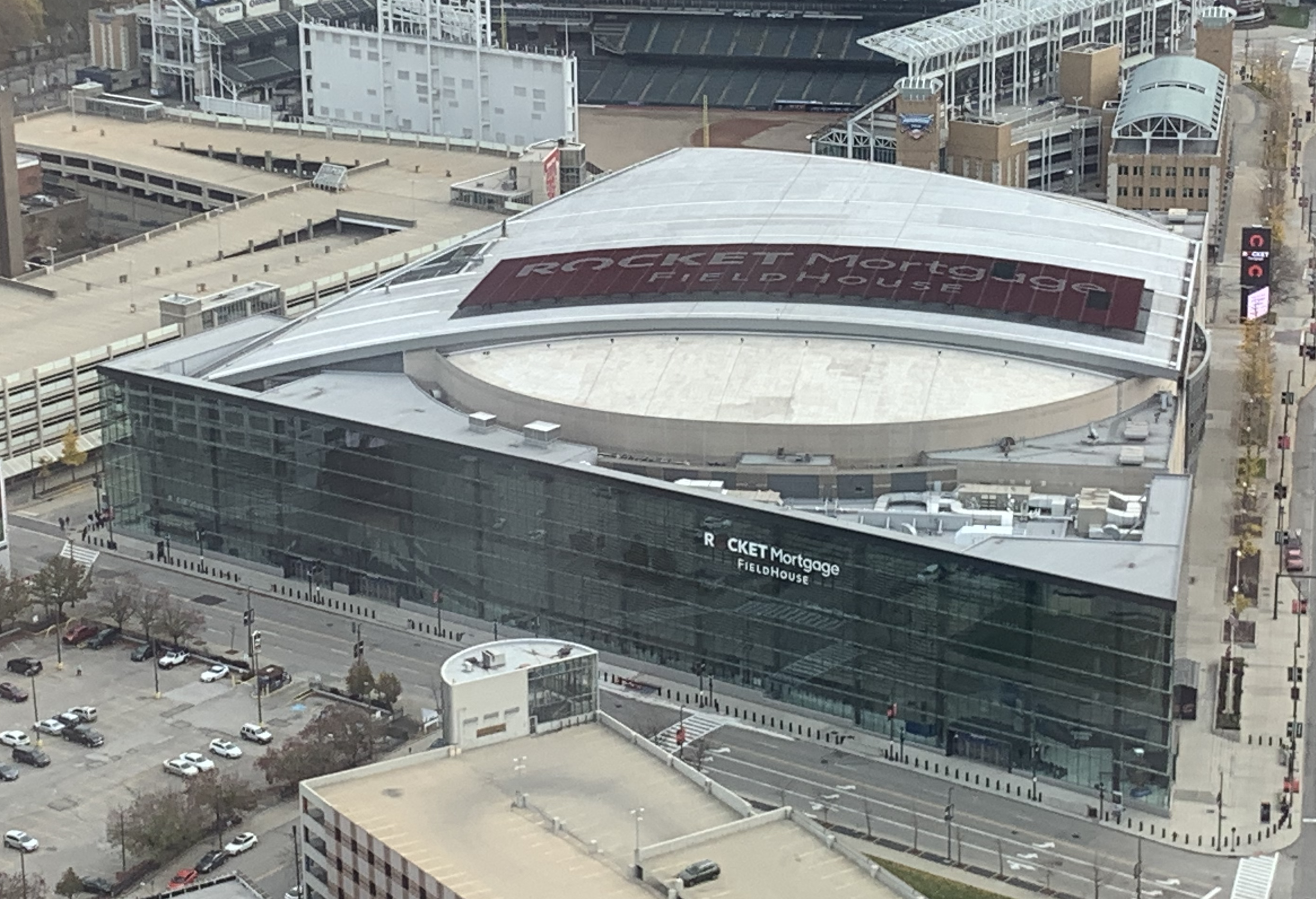
- Rocket Arena, then named Rocket Mortgage Fieldhouse, in 2022

- Location in Cleveland Location in Ohio Location in the United States
- Former names: Gund Arena (1994–2005); Quicken Loans Arena (2005–2019); Rocket Mortgage FieldHouse (2019–2025)
- Address: 1 Center Court
- Location: Cleveland, Ohio, U.S.
- Coordinates: 41°29′47″N 81°41′17″W
- Owner: Gateway Economic Development Corp.
- Operator: Dan Gilbert via Rocket Companies
- Capacity: Basketball: 19,432; Ice hockey: 18,926
- Public transit: Tower City

Construction
- Groundbreaking: April 27, 1992
- Opened: October 17, 1994
- Renovated: 2019
- Cost: $100 million ($217 million in 2025 dollars)
- Architect: Ellerbe Becket
- Project managers: Seagull Bay Sports, LLC.
- Services engineer: URS Corporation
- General contractor: Turner/Choice/Bradley/Zunt

Tenants
- Cleveland Cavaliers (NBA) 1994–present Cleveland Lumberjacks (IHL) 1994–2001; Cleveland Rockers (WNBA) 1997–2003; Cleveland Barons (AHL) 2001–2006; Cleveland Monsters (AHL) 2007–present Cleveland Gladiators (AFL) 2008–2017; Cleveland Crush (LFL) 2011–2013

Website
- rocketarena.com

Rocket Arena is a multi-purpose arena in Cleveland, Ohio. The building is the home of the Cleveland Cavaliers of the National Basketball Association (NBA) and the Cleveland Monsters of the American Hockey League (AHL). It is also the planned home of the Cleveland Sirens of the Women's National Basketball Association (WNBA), which is scheduled to begin play in 2028. In the past, the arena has served as the home venue for a number of additional teams, including the Cleveland Lumberjacks of the International Hockey League, the Cleveland Rockers of the WNBA, the Cleveland Barons of the AHL, the Cleveland Gladiators of the Arena Football League, the Cleveland Crush of the Legends Football League, and as a secondary home for the Cleveland State Vikings men's and women's basketball teams.

Rocket Arena opened in October 1994 as part of the Gateway Sports and Entertainment Complex with adjacent Progressive Field, which opened in April of that year. The facility replaced Richfield Coliseum as the primary entertainment facility for the region and the home of the Cavaliers, and supplanted the Wolstein Center at Cleveland State University, which opened in 1991, as the primary concert and athletic venue in downtown Cleveland. From its opening in October 1994 until August 2005, it was known as Gund Arena, named for former Cavaliers owner Gordon Gund, after he paid for the naming rights. After purchasing a majority of the Cavaliers in March 2005, Dan Gilbert bought the naming rights in August 2005 and renamed the building Quicken Loans Arena after his mortgage lending company Quicken Loans. It was renamed Rocket Mortgage FieldHouse in April 2019 when Quicken Loans rebranded to Rocket Mortgage, as part of the facility's renovation and expansion. The name was updated to the current Rocket Arena in 2025 to align with the rebranding of the various financial businesses under the Rocket name.

Rocket Arena seats 19,432 people in its basketball configuration and up to 18,926 for ice hockey. It is a frequent site for concerts and other athletic events, such as the men's and women's basketball tournaments of the Mid-American Conference (MAC), hosting since 2000 and 2001, respectively. It has also been the host venue for two NCAA Division I Women's Final Fours, in 2007 and 2024; opening and regional semifinal games in the NCAA Division I men's basketball tournament; two U.S. Figure Skating Championships, in 2000 and 2009; and the 2016 Republican National Convention.

== History ==
The Gund Arena logo and name was used from 1994 to 2005.

Rocket Arena was preceded in downtown Cleveland by the Cleveland Arena, a facility built in 1937 with a seating capacity for basketball of approximately 12,000. It was best known as the site of the Moondog Coronation Ball in 1952, widely regarded as the first rock and roll concert. Cleveland Arena was the first home of the Cavaliers in 1970.

The Cleveland Arena was also the home of an earlier professional basketball team, the Cleveland Rebels of the Basketball Association of America, the original Cleveland Barons ice hockey team, and hosted several games of the Cincinnati Royals of the NBA in the 1960s. By 1970, however, Cleveland Arena was outdated and in disrepair. The Cavs played there their first four seasons. It was replaced in 1974 by the 20,273-seat Richfield Coliseum, located in Richfield, between Cleveland and Akron.

The Quicken Loans Arena logo and name was used from 2005 to 2019.

During the 1980s, the site of the Central Market, a fruit and vegetable market that dated back to 1856, was selected for construction of a multi-purpose domed stadium for the Cleveland Browns and Cleveland Indians, but the ballot measure to fund it was defeated by voters. The market site was acquired in 1985 and cleared in 1987 in a continued push for new downtown sports facilities by city and business leaders. In 1990, voters approved a sin tax on alcohol and tobacco products in Cuyahoga County to fund the Gateway Sports and Entertainment Complex, which includes the arena and adjacent Progressive Field. Construction began in 1992 with the ballpark opening in April 1994 and the arena in October 1994. The arena opened with a concert by Billy Joel on October 17, 1994. The Cavaliers played their first regular-season game in the arena a few weeks later, a loss to the Houston Rockets on November 8, 1994.

The Rocket Mortgage FieldHouse logo and name was used from 2019 to 2025.

As part of his purchase of the team and the arena naming rights in 2005, Dan Gilbert, owner of Quicken Loans, funded renovations of the arena, which included installing new wine-colored seats, state-of-the-art scoreboards, video systems, and sound systems, new arena graphics and signage, and upgrades to security, locker rooms, and the suites, all of which were in place for the start of the Cavaliers' 2005–2006 season, except for the seats, which were replaced a few sections at a time.

Gilbert purchased the then-inactive Utah Grizzlies franchise of the American Hockey League on May 16, 2006, and announced that it would move to Quicken Loans Arena to replace the departed Cleveland Barons. The team name was announced as the Lake Erie Monsters on January 25, 2007, and began play in the 2007–08 season. The Lake Erie Monsters changed their name to the Cleveland Monsters on August 9, 2016.

The Las Vegas Gladiators of the Arena Football League announced on October 16, 2007, that they would move to Quicken Loans Arena, becoming the Cleveland Gladiators.

=== Improvements ===
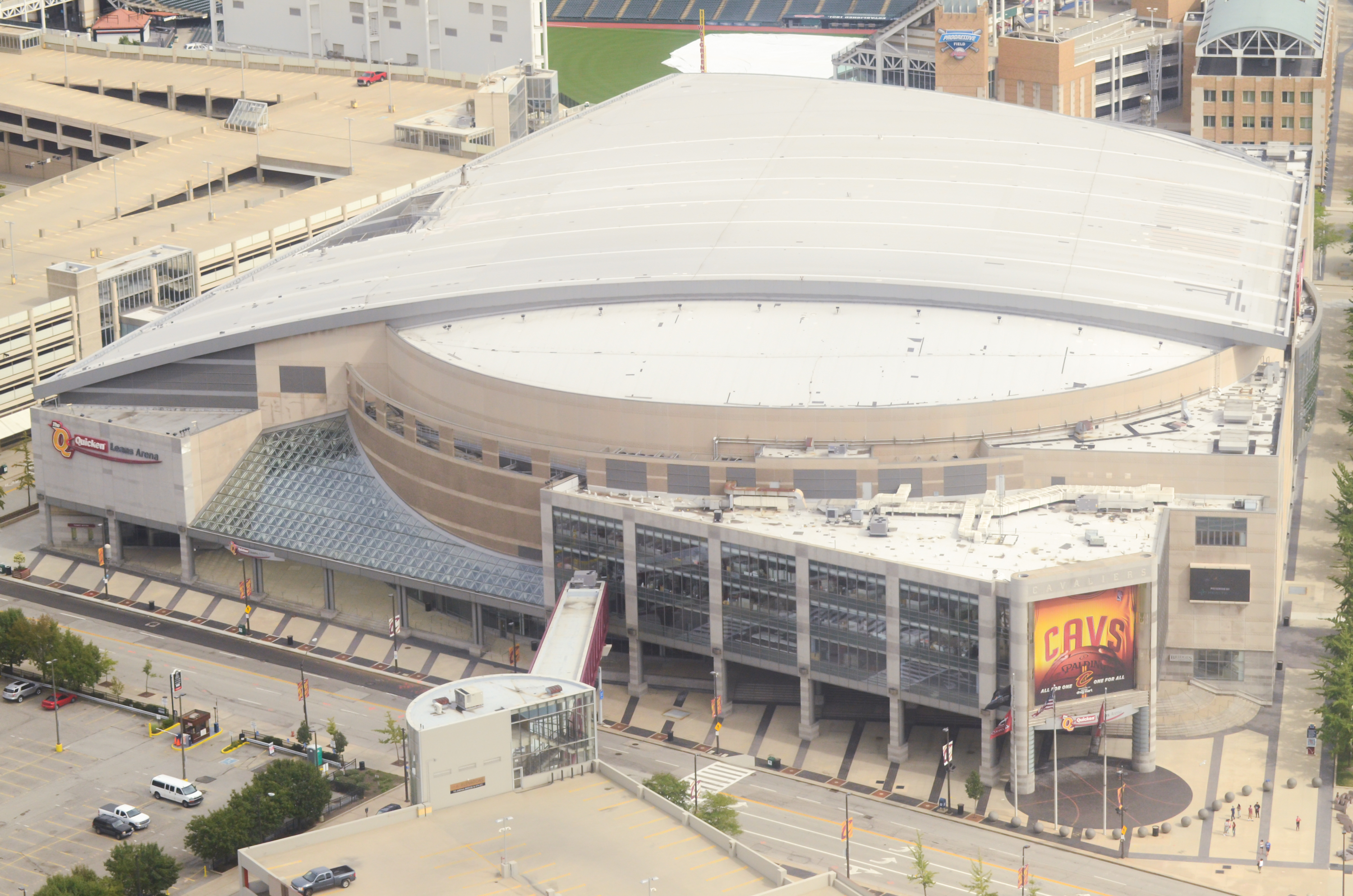
Exterior in 2014, prior to renovations

In December 2016, the Cavaliers announced plans for renovations to the arena that included an increase in the square footage of the concourses and open areas, along with upgrades throughout the building. The plan, which relied partly on tax money for funding, faced opposition from activist groups including the Cuyahoga County Progressive Caucus and the Greater Cleveland Congregations (GCC). After the groups submitted signatures to force a referendum on the plan, the Cavaliers announced that they were withdrawing from the plan, citing rising costs and delays caused by the prospective referendum. However, in August 2017, after Cuyahoga County made a non-binding commitment to build two mental health crisis centers, the GCC withdrew its petitions. In December 2017, the team stated it was moving forward with the renovations. The project was finished in September 2019 by The Whiting-Turner Contracting Company, with the final cost being approximately $185 million.

=== Design and operations ===
The arena seats 19,432 for basketball, with 2,000 club seats and 88 luxury suites. Seating is divided into three levels, with two main levels of suites and five "platinum suites" on the event level. Around the seating there are two main concourses, one on the ground level to access the 100 level seating and 32 lower suites, and an upper concourse for the top 200 level seating. The lower concourse also includes the ticket office and the two-level main team shop. In between is the club level, which provides access to the 60 upper suites and club seating. Also on the club level is an auxiliary gym, which was used by the Cavaliers as their main practice court until the opening of the Cleveland Clinic Courts practice facility in 2007.

In the hockey and arena football configuration, capacity is 18,926. During most Monsters games, the upper-level seating is closed and covered by a large curtain, reducing capacity to 9,447. In the basketball configuration, when the upper-level seating is closed, capacity is listed at 11,751. 60% of the seating is located in the lower two levels. The seating capacity was reduced in 2018 as part of a major renovation project that expanded the concourses, removed three sections of seating in the upper level, and updated other parts of the facility. From the opening of the arena until 2018, seating capacity for basketball was listed at 20,562, with a maximum for ice hockey and arena football at 20,056.

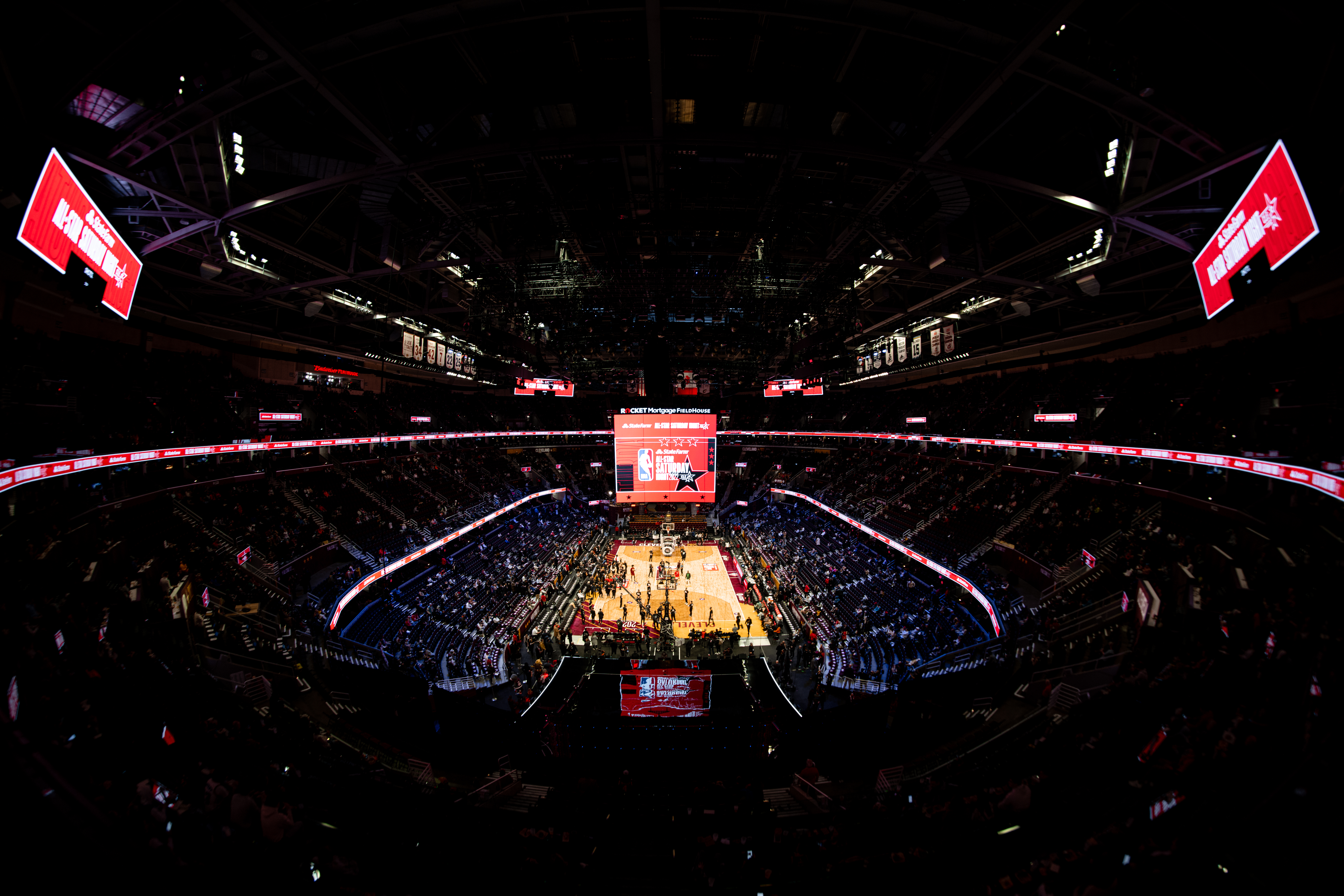
The scoreboard during the 2022 NBA All Star Game

The main scoreboard at Rocket Arena, nicknamed Humongotron, is the fourth largest scoreboard used in an NBA arena. It was installed in October 2014 by ANC Sports Enterprises.

On the roof of the building is a large LED message board that measures 360 feet (110 m) by 90 feet (27 m). The sign was approved by the Cleveland City Planning Commission in March 2016 with the stipulation that only the arena's name or its naming rights sponsor can be shown. Any other use of the sign needs commission approval.

The arena, along with neighboring Progressive Field and an adjacent parking garage, is owned by the Gateway Economic Development Corporation of Greater Cleveland, an entity made up of members appointed by the governments of the city of Cleveland and Cuyahoga County. Gateway leases the arena to the Cavaliers, who also manage the Cleveland Monsters.

In March 2017, in partnership with the non-profit organization KultureCity, the Cavaliers officially introduced the availability of accommodations during all events for guests with hypersensitivity needs, such as attendees with autism spectrum disorders. This includes staff training, free "sensory bags" with headphones, a blanket, and other items geared towards attendees with sensory needs, as well as a sensory room and exemptions from re-entry policies if they are overwhelmed by the environment. The arena became the first in the NBA to be certified by KultureCity as being "sensory inclusive".

== Tenants ==
=== Current ===
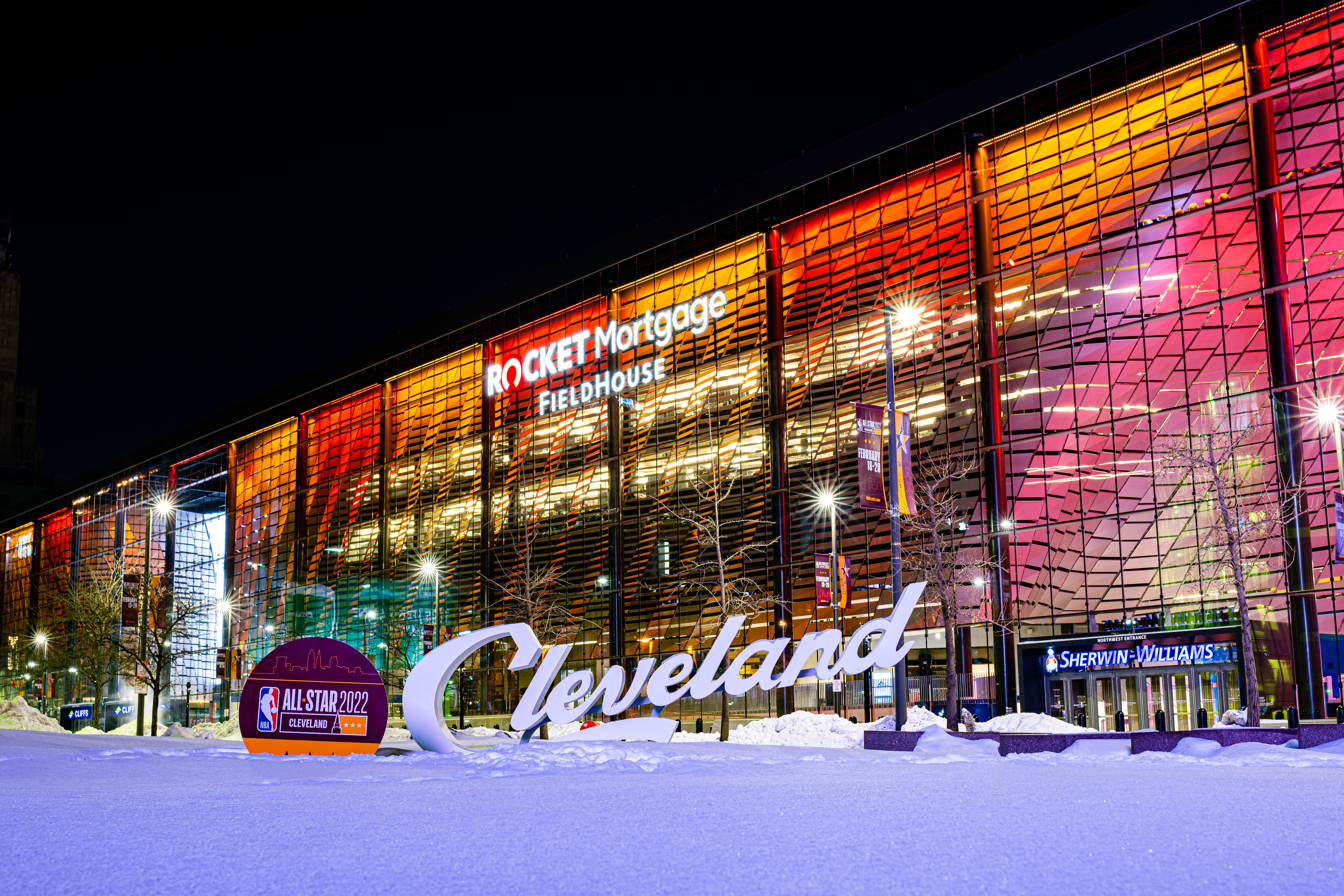
Exterior view in 2022

As the home of the Cavaliers and Monsters, Rocket Arena has hosted a number of notable events for each team, including playoff and championship games. Through the 2020–2021 season, the Cavs have hosted playoff games in 12 of their 27 seasons at Rocket Arena, including games three and four of the 2007 NBA Finals, 2017 Finals, 2018 Finals and games three, four, and six of the 2015 and 2016 Finals. The arena was also the site of the 1997 NBA All-Star Game, which celebrated the 50th anniversary of the founding of the NBA, and it also hosted the 2022 All-Star Game, honoring the league's 75th anniversary.

The Monsters made their playoff debut in 2011 and returned to the playoffs in 2016. In the 2016 Calder Cup playoffs, the team advanced to the Calder Cup final and swept the Hershey Bears in four games for their first Calder Cup in franchise history. Games three and four were held at Rocket Arena. Game four, held on June 11, was a sell-out and drew 19,665 fans, which set a record for largest crowd to ever see a professional hockey game in the state of Ohio and the second-largest postseason crowd in American Hockey League history.

On June 30, 2025, the WNBA announced their new team to play in Cleveland, which will bring the league back to both the arena and Cleveland for the first time since 2003.

=== Former ===
Rocket Arena has been home to other franchises that have either relocated or folded. When it opened in 1994, in addition to being home of the Cavaliers, it was also the home arena for the Cleveland Lumberjacks of the International Hockey League (IHL). The Lumberjacks played at the arena until 2001, when the team folded along with the IHL. Later that year, a new incarnation of the Cleveland Barons, who played in the American Hockey League, began play and were tenants at the arena until 2006 when the team moved to Worcester, Massachusetts.

The Cleveland Gladiators of the Arena Football League qualified for the playoffs in six of their nine seasons in Cleveland and hosted playoff games in 2008, 2011, and 2014. During the 2014 season, the team finished 15–1 overall and advanced to ArenaBowl XXVII, which was held at Rocket Arena. The game drew 18,410 fans and was held at the same time as a Cleveland Browns home preseason game at FirstEnergy Stadium, and a Cleveland Indians home game at adjacent Progressive Field.

Two women's professional teams have also called the arena home. From 1997 to 2003, the Cleveland Rockers, one of the eight charter members of the Women's National Basketball Association (WNBA), played at Rocket Arena. The team folded after the 2003 WNBA season because the Gunds, who still owned the Cavs at that point, no longer wished to operate the Rockers franchise, and a new ownership group could not be obtained. The Cleveland Crush of the Lingerie Football League played at Rocket Arena for their 2011–12 and 2012–13 seasons before moving to Toledo, Ohio, in late 2013.

== Events ==
=== College sports ===
In addition to its professional sports tenants, Rocket Arena has hosted several intercollegiate sporting events. It has been home to the Mid-American Conference (MAC) men's basketball tournament since 2000 and the MAC women's basketball tournament since 2001. "MAC Madness," as it is known, has become a strong draw for the arena. The men's semi-final and championship games routinely draw 10,000–15,000 attendees. In addition, the Rocket Arena has served as a host for games of the NCAA Men's Division I Basketball Championship, hosting early-round games in 2011 and regional semi-final and final games in 2015. Rocket Arena has also hosted games for the NCAA Women's Division I Basketball Championship, hosting regional semi-finals and finals for the 2006 tournament and the Final Four and national championship games in the 2007 tournament and the 2024 tournament.

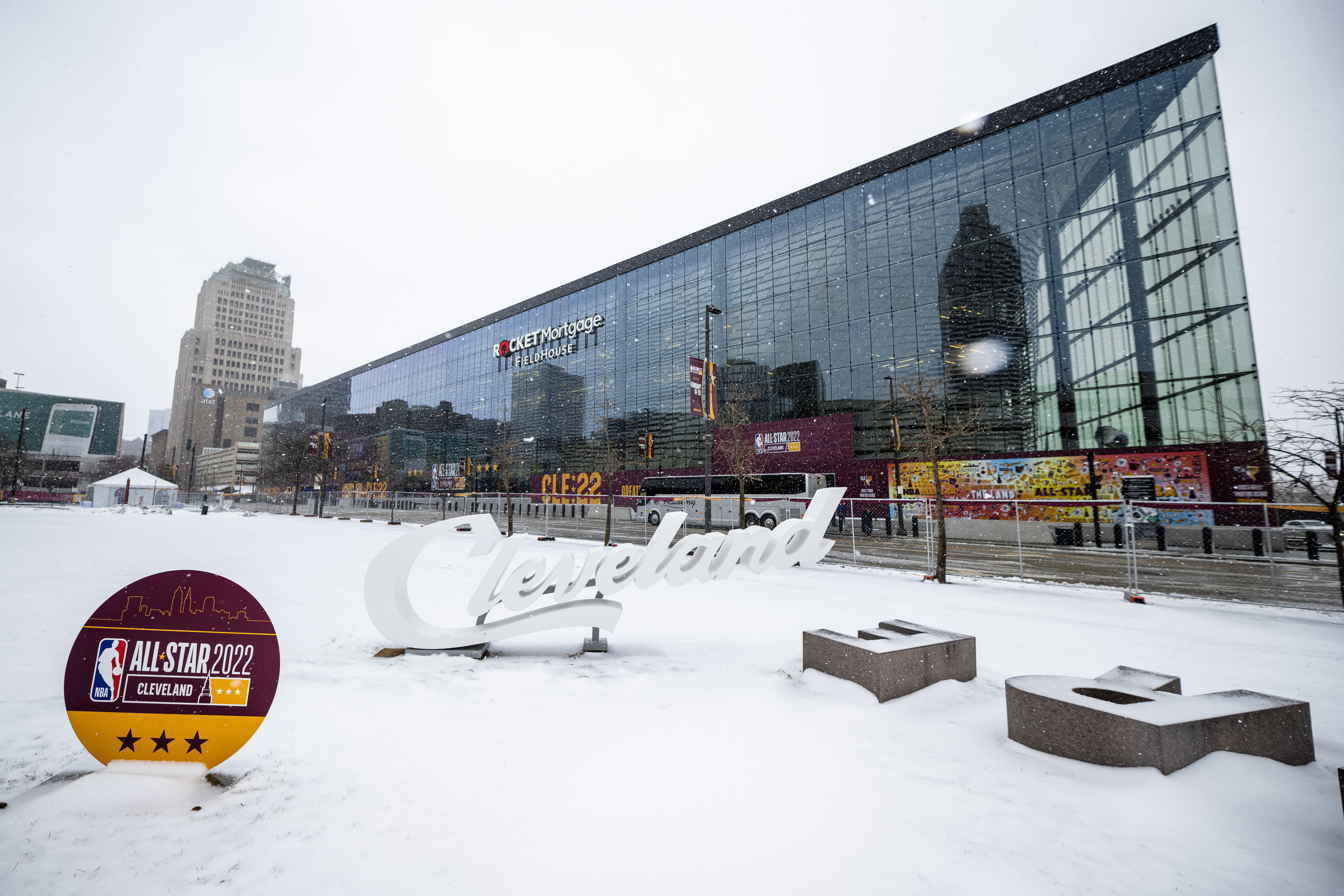
Exterior view in February 2022

In 2015, it was announced that arena management and Cleveland State University came to an agreement where select Cleveland State Vikings men's and women's basketball games would take place at Rocket Arena, while the arena would essentially take over operations of the Wolstein Center, CSU's primary home arena, being in charge of promoting and booking events at the venue.

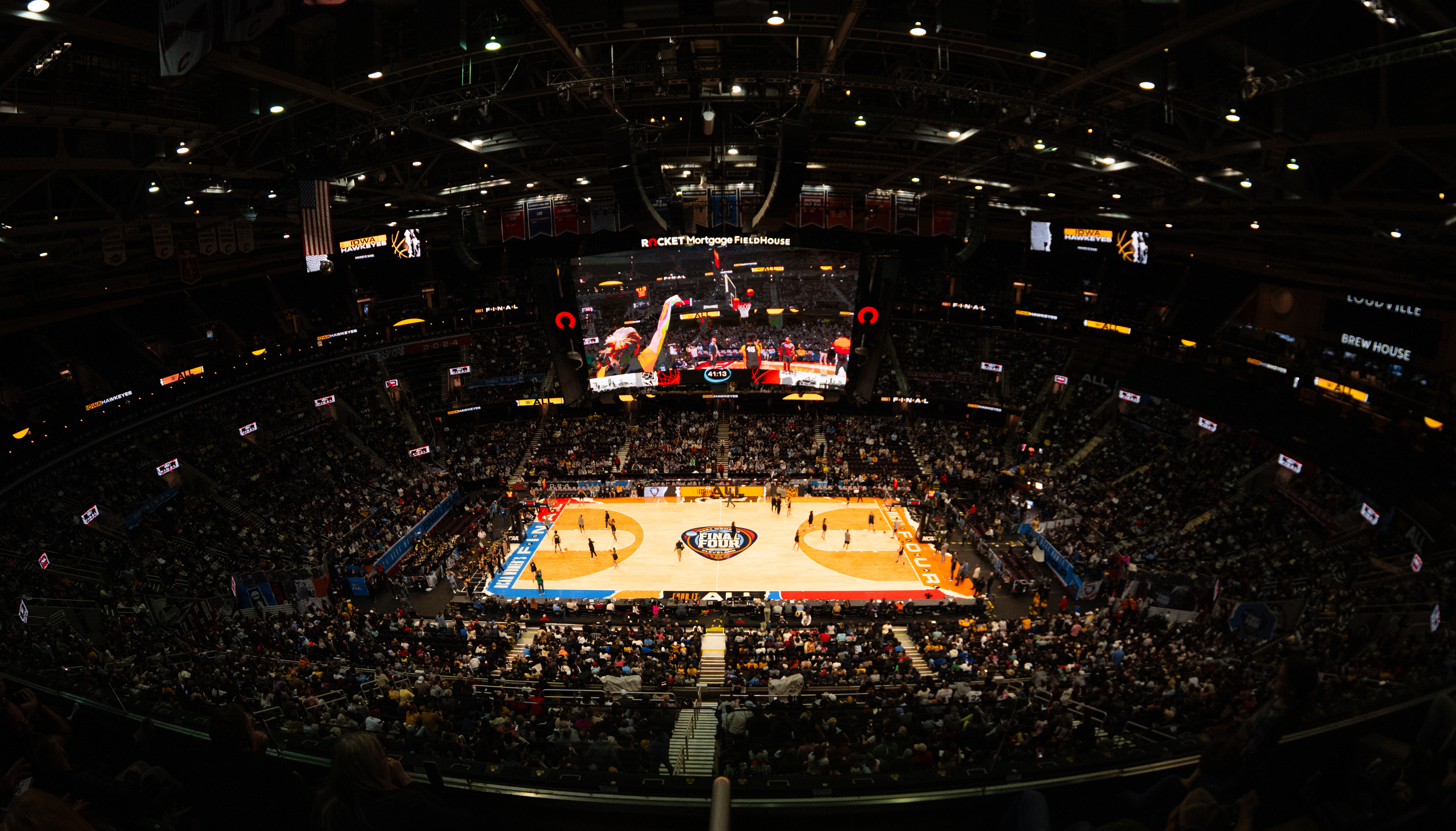
A view from inside the arena.

=== WWE ===
The arena has hosted numerous WWE professional wrestling cards, including pay–per–view events such as:

- SummerSlam (1996) – headlined by Shawn Michaels vs. Vader for the WWF Championship
- No Mercy (1999) – headlined by Triple H vs. Stone Cold Steve Austin for the WWF Championship
- Invasion (2001) – headlined by Team Alliance vs. Team WWF
- Survivor Series (2004) – headlined by Team Orton vs. Team Triple H
- Unforgiven (2008) – headlined by the World Heavyweight Championship Scramble match
- TLC: Tables, Ladders and Chairs (2014) – headlined by Bray Wyatt vs. Dean Ambrose in a TLC match
- Fastlane (2016) – headlined by Brock Lesnar vs. Roman Reigns vs. Dean Ambrose in a Triple Threat match for the No. 1 contender for the WWE World Heavyweight Championship at WrestleMania 32
- Fastlane (2019) – headlined by The Shield vs. Baron Corbin, Drew McIntyre and Bobby Lashley

=== Boxing ===
On August 29, 2021, Cleveland native and internet personality turned professional boxer Jake Paul took on former UFC Welterweight Champion Tyron Woodley in an 8-round professional boxing match. Paul won the eight round bout via split decision in front of a nearly sold-out Rocket Arena.

=== Other events ===
Rocket Arena was selected in July 2014 as the host site for the 2016 Republican National Convention. The arena hosted the first Republican presidential debate of the 2016 election, aired by Fox News Channel, on August 6, 2015. The convention was held July 18–21, 2016. Records obtained by the Center for Public Integrity show that Comcast, Microsoft, the American Petroleum Institute, Chevron, Koch Companies Public Sector, PhRMA, and other trade and lobby groups, "funded a limited liability company called 'Friends of the House 2016 LLC' to pay for "the design and outfitting of an exclusive office, lounge and gathering space, called the 'cloakroom', for Republican lawmakers" on the Cleveland Cavaliers practice court Quicken Loans Arena. The Cleveland 2016 Host Committee, who "facilitated construction of the 'cloakroom" space', received $923,100 from the Friends of the House 2016 LLC."

The 2021 and 2024 Rock and Roll Hall of Fame induction ceremonies were held at Rocket Arena.

On August 22, 2026, Real American Freestyle will present RAF 12 at the venue, an event that will be broadcast live on Fox Nation.

== See also ==
- List of indoor arenas by capacity

Events and tenants
Preceded by Richfield Coliseum	Home of the Cleveland Cavaliers; 1994–present	Succeeded by current
Preceded by Orleans Arena	Home of the Cleveland Gladiators; 2008–2017	Succeeded by none
Preceded by E Center	Home of the Cleveland Monsters; 2007–present	Succeeded by current
Preceded by SeaGate Convention Centre	Host of the Mid-American Conference men's basketball tournament 2000–present	Succeeded by current
Preceded by Alamodome; State Farm Arena	Host of the NBA All-Star Game; 1997; 2022	Succeeded by Madison Square Garden; Vivint Arena
