= Leo A. Berg =

American politician

Mayor of Akron, Ohio
- In office 1954–1961
- Preceded by: Russell M. Bird
- Succeeded by: Edward O. Erickson

Personal details
- Born: December 5, 1907 Cleveland, Ohio, U.S.
- Died: May 17, 1980 (aged 72) Akron, Ohio, U.S.
- Party: Democratic

Leo Andrew Berg (December 5, 1907 – May 1980) was an American politician who served as mayor of Akron, Ohio, from 1954 to 1961. He was a delegate to the Democratic National Convention from Ohio in both 1956 and 1960. During his tenure, he served as the Chairman to the League of Mayors, bringing him to the US Capitol on a regular basis. His wife, Evelyn, and he traveled to Washington D.C. often, where they spent time with their friends, Jack and Jackie Kennedy. A 1962 study undertaken by the polling firm of Louis Harris and paid for by the Democratic National Committee considered the possibility of running Berg as a candidate for the congressional seat then held by Republican William H. Ayres, but ultimately concluded that Oliver Ocasek would make a better candidate. Ocasek was defeated in the 1962 general election.

Leo's father, Jon Berg, emigrated from Germany to the United States before World War I. Jon Berg was a fairly well known German inventor, with over 100 patents to his name. Among his patents were the switchtrack for the trolley, and a piece integral to the conversion of the Gatling gun to the machine gun. Jon Berg taught his son Leo to speak German fluently, something that Leo used to help further American goals in World War II. Leo A. Berg assisted the American government in the Second World War by conducting voice-over-radio operations to the Germans.

== See also ==
- List of mayors of Akron, Ohio
