= Jim Isabella =

American radio talk show host

Jim Isabella is an American conservative radio talk show host based in Northeast Ohio, formerly of the radio station WNIR, in Kent, Ohio. His show was called the Jim Isabella Show.

== Career ==
Before working at WNIR, Isabella previously was a newspaper correspondent for the Sun Newspaper for twenty years, and later became a correspondent for the Akron Beacon Journal for ten years. Isabella took on the role as the main substitute host for WNIR's other talk shows in July 2010, and frequently called into the shows of the late Howie Chizek and Tom Erickson. He filled in for their shows after Chizek unexpectedly died in June 2012 and Erickson fell ill around that same time period. During this time the audience got to know Isabella better and began to call for him to have his own show. When Erickson died on November 3, Isabella was offered and accepted Erickson's previous time slot, and has since remained at WNIR, while also doing sports broadcasting at WKNR.

Isabella temporarily went off the air for five weeks when he caught COVID-19 in March 2020, and returned to work in April of that same year, with his time slot filled in by syndicated personalities Jim Bohannon and Mike Gallager. According to his Twitter page and announced over the air by his fill in on February 7, 2022, it said that Isabella was, “Former talk show host WNIR 100.1 FM in Akron 10 yrs”. There has been no statement by the Klaus brothers on this statement.

Isabella declared in January 2023 his intent to run for mayor of Akron in the 2023 mayoral election. He was the only known Republican to declare their intent to run. On February 13, the Summit County Board of Elections voted to reject Isabella's petition to run for not containing enough valid signatures.

== Personal life ==
Isabella was previously married to his late wife, Irene, who died in February 2013. He is recently separated from his second wife, Teresa.
