= 2004 Summit County, Ohio Executive election =

- November 2, 2004
Nominee	James McCarthy
Party	Democratic
Popular vote	187,488
Percentage	100.00%
County Executive before election
James McCarthy
Democratic
Elected County Executive
James McCarthy
Democratic

The 2004 Summit County, Ohio Executive election took place on November 2, 2004. Incumbent Democratic County Executive James McCarthy ran for re-election to a second term. No challengers filed to run against him, and he won the Democratic primary and general election unopposed.

However, McCarthy would not end up serving out his full term as County Executive. He resigned on June 30, 2007, and was succeeded by Russ Pry.

== Democratic primary ==
=== Candidates ===
- James McCarthy, incumbent County Executive

=== Results ===
Democratic primary results
Party	Candidate	Votes	%
Democratic	James McCarthy (inc.)	49,196	100.00%
Total votes		49,196	100.00%

== General election ==
=== Results ===
2004 Summit County Executive election
Party	Candidate	Votes	%
Democratic	James McCarthy (inc.)	187,488	100.00%
Total votes		187,488	100.00%
Democratic hold			
