= Cuyahoga County Progressive Caucus =

- Predecessor: Bernie Sanders presidential campaign, 2016
- Founded: 2016
- Location: Lakewood, Ohio
- Political Director: Steve Holecko
- Key people: Steve Holecko, Tristan Rader, Yvonka Hall
- Website: www.cuycpc.org

The Cuyahoga County Progressive Caucus (CCPC) is a progressive political organization in the Greater Cleveland area, headquartered in Lakewood, Ohio.

== Activities ==
=== Founding and early activism ===
In July 2016, around the time of the Republican National Convention in Cleveland, a group of supporters of Senator Bernie Sanders' unsuccessful 2016 presidential campaign founded the Cuyahoga County Progressive Caucus on Cleveland's west side. According to CCPC co-founder and political director Steve Holecko, "When we realized Bernie would fall short, we decided to stay together. Cuyahoga County didn't have an organization with the word 'progressive' in it, so we formed the Cuyahoga County Progressive Caucus."

In the months after its founding, the group participated in the local protest to raise minimum wage, recruited candidates to run for Cleveland City Council, and worked with Nina Turner to develop a "common civic agenda". Turner later became president of Our Revolution, a national political group started by Sanders to elect progressive candidates. The CCPC is Our Revolution's local Cleveland affiliate.

In June 2017, the CCPC organized a protest outside a fundraiser for Cleveland Mayor Frank G. Jackson's reelection at insurance executive Umberto Federi's Gates Mills home. The event, nicknamed Frank's Cat Festival, protested corporate contributions in local politics.

By its one-year anniversary, in July 2017, the organization had grown to approximately 2,600 members.

=== Opposition to the Q deal ===
In February 2017, the group announced its opposition to plans to use tax money to renovate Quicken Loans Arena (the Q), home of the Cleveland Cavaliers. The proposed renovation—which included plans to add a new glass front, additional gathering places, and food areas—was estimated to cost $282 million over 17 years, with taxes from Cleveland and Cuyahoga County paying for $160 million of that. The CCPC opposed use of any tax dollars to renovate the Q, contrasting with some other groups against the plan.

== Positions and endorsements ==
In the 2017 Cleveland mayoral election, CCPC members voted to endorse City Councilman Jeff Johnson. They also endorsed candidates for Cleveland City Council in seven of Cleveland's 17 wards, none of them incumbents. Tristan Rader, a co-founder of CCPC and its operations director, was elected to Lakewood City Councial at-large. Cleveland Magazine called Rader "the first new candidate to emerge from a lefty resurgence bringing a lively brand of Democratic politics to Northeast Ohio and embodied by the Cuyahoga County Progressive Caucus." In 2018, co-founder Steve Holecko sought the Democratic nomination for the Ohio House of Representatives' 14th District, but lost to Bride Rose Sweeney in the primary.
