= William D. Mason =

Ohio prosecutor

Bill Mason "William D." (born 1959) is the former prosecutor of Cuyahoga County, Ohio. He took office in 1999, succeeding Stephanie Tubbs Jones. Mason was re-elected in 2004 and 2008.

Mason was born and raised in Parma, Ohio, and was an accomplished wrestler in high school. After completing his undergraduate degree at Kent State University, Mason went to the Cleveland State University College of Law where he graduated with a Juris Doctor degree and became an assistant prosecuting attorney for Cuyahoga County, Ohio. While an assistant county prosecutor, he became involved in Ohio Democratic politics in 1993. Mason became a councilman in the city of Parma and was eventually elected the Law Director and Chief Prosecutor, serving for six years before taking his current position.

Mason is currently the chair of the Ohio Internet Crimes Against Children (ICAC) Task Force. The Ohio ICAC now has 281 law enforcement partner agencies across the state and at least one ICAC law enforcement agency in each of Ohio’s 88 counties, making it one of the largest and most successful ICAC task forces in the nation. The United States Department of Justice awarded Mason with the 2006 National Leadership Award, which was the first time presenting this award.

Mason chairs the Agency Council for Cuyahoga County Justice System Reform, overseeing committees implementing Justice Management Institute recommendations, a county-wide reform initiative aimed at making the justice system more efficient and effective. He also chairs the Great Lakes Energy Development Task Force which aims to create jobs by bringing renewable energy industries to Northeast Ohio. The first project he is spearheading is the Great Lakes Wind Energy Center, a pilot project of several offshore wind turbines on Lake Erie.

Mason was a delegate to the 2000 Democratic National Convention. He co-wrote, with Jack P. DeSario, Dr. Sam Sheppard on Trial: Case Closed (Kent State University Press 2003). Mason supported John Kerry at the 2004 Democratic National Convention and supported Barack Obama for the 2008 Ohio primary. He has been mentioned as a possible candidate for statewide office, or for county executive in the new Cuyahoga County charter form of government, which was approved by voters in November 2008.

Bill and his wife have four children. Bill has 15 brothers and sisters.

== Controversies ==
A 2008 Cleveland Scene article revealed a number of criminals who donate large sums of money to Mason's political campaigns. In August, 2009, the Ohio Ethics Commission subpoenaed records from his office related to contracts his office awarded to Qwestcom Graphics, a company co-owned by Mason's business partner. In December, 2009, a Cuyahoga County Common Peas judge accused Mason of trying to intimidate her decision in the case of a childhood friend of Mason's. On December 30, Mason was the passenger in a car driven by his campaign manager Tom Regas when Regas was pulled over by Seven Hills police and arrested for drunken driving. Seven Hills police inexplicably did not put Mason's name in the report of the incident, though an officer did drive Mason home. In 2010, the Cleveland Scene stated that "federal charges against him are expected within the next two month" as part of the federal investigation of corruption in Cuyahoga County politics that convicted County Auditor Frank Russo and Commissioner Jimmy Dimora, but no charges were actually filed.

== 2012 Election ==
On October 24, 2010 Bill Mason announced via live interview on WKYC-3 that he will not seek re-election in 2012. He stated that "It's a done deal" and "I have already made that decision."
