= Dan Horrigan =

American politician

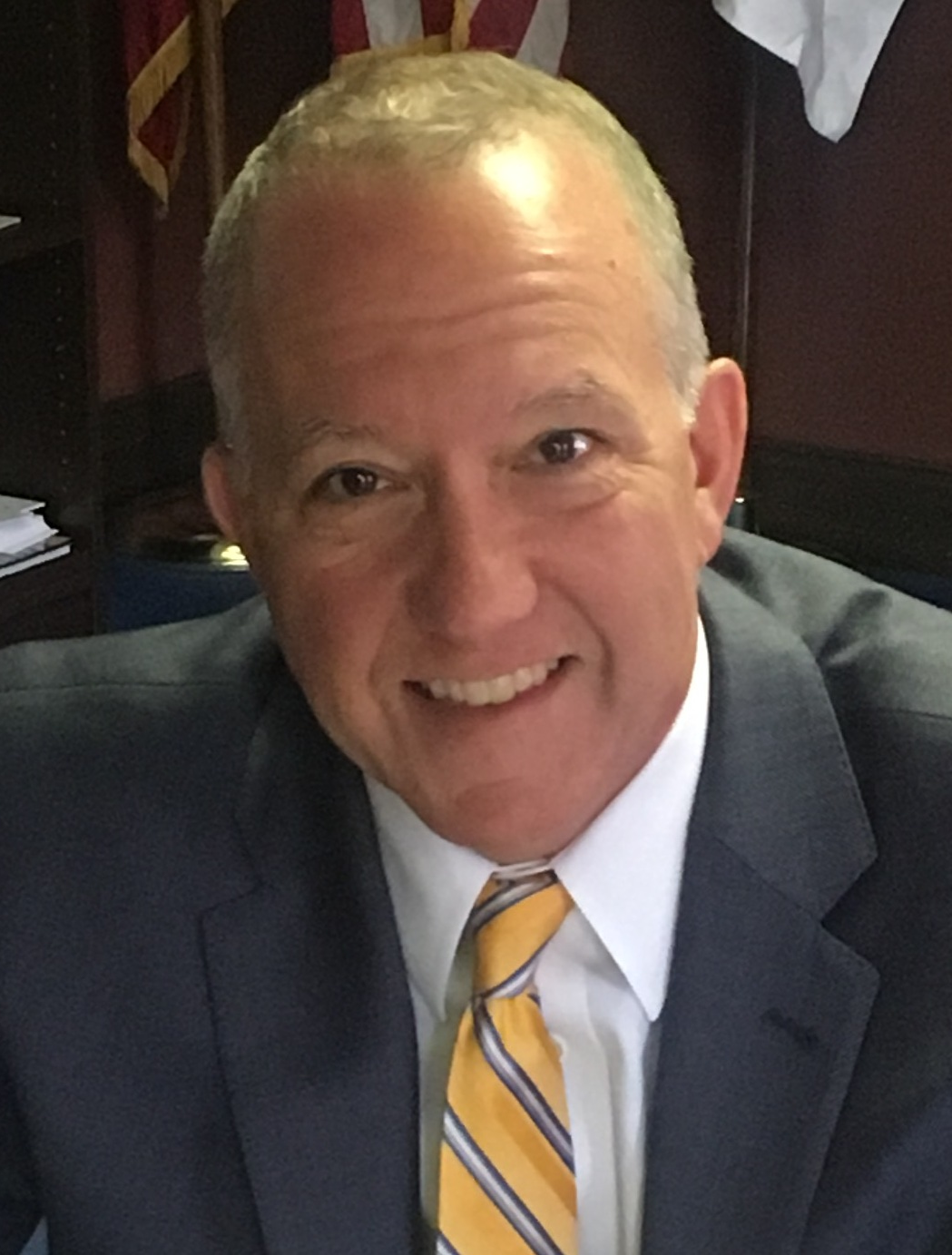

62nd Mayor of Akron
- In office January 1, 2016 – January 1, 2024
- Preceded by: Jeff Fusco
- Succeeded by: Shammas Malik

Personal details
- Born: 1963 (age 62–63) Akron, Ohio, U.S.
- Party: Democratic
- Spouse: Deanna
- Education: Kent State University (BA); University of Akron (BEd)

Dan Horrigan (born 1963) is an American politician and educator who served as the 62nd mayor of Akron, Ohio, from November 3, 2015, to January 1, 2024. Horrigan previously served eight years as the Clerk of Summit County's Common Pleas Courts. Horrigan is a member of the Democratic Party.

== Early life and education ==
Shortly after earning his Bachelor of Arts in economics from Kent State University, Horrigan returned to school to earn an additional degree in education from the University of Akron. Horrigan then taught social studies at St. Vincent–St. Mary High School from 1996 to 1998.

In 1999, Horrigan left his position with the school to successfully run for Akron City Council. Horrigan represented Akron's Ward 1, including Highland Square and North Hill, from 1999 to 2007. In his time as Ward 1 Council representative, he chaired the Public Utilities Committee and was a senior member of the Planning Budget & Finance and Parks & Recreation Committees. In 2001, Horrigan brought together business leaders and residents to develop a comprehensive plan for the Highland Square neighborhood. The plan's vision led to a new library, new school, and new grocery store.

== Career ==
=== Summit County Clerk of Courts ===
In 2007, the Democratic Party of Summit County selected Horrigan as the Clerk of Summit County's Common Pleas Courts, where he oversaw an office of 87 public employees.

=== 2015 mayoral election ===
Horrigan announced his candidacy for mayor on June 9, 2015. In addition to economic revival, his campaign focused on a number of local issues such as finding affordable solutions to the city's sewage system issues, union contracts, downtown development, and increased citizen engagement. Following his victory on November 3, 2015, Horrigan became Akron's first newly-elected mayor in 28 years.

September 8, 2015, primary election
Candidate	Total votes
Daniel Horrigan	10,647
Michael D. Williams	8,088

November 3, 2015, general election
Candidate	Total votes	Percentage of Votes
Daniel Horrigan (DEM)	29,436	72.33%
Eddie Sipplen (REP)	9,732	23.91%
William N. Melver	1,528	3.75%

=== Tenure ===
==== Blue Ribbon Task Force ====
Following his election, Horrigan appointed a "Blue Ribbon Task Force" composed of local business and community leaders, to "look under the hood" of City government and make recommendations for its management.

==== Early initiatives and policies ====
During Mayor Horrigan's first year in office, he led a variety of successful initiatives including: rebuilding relationships with the United States EPA; and working closely with Huntington Bank as it acquired FirstMerit Corporation. Mayor Horrigan also followed through on a recommendation to appoint the City of Akron's first ever Human Resources Director, which required an amendment to the City's charter.

Other successes for Mayor Horrigan during his first year in office included: hosting six town hall meetings within the community and meeting with every high school senior class within the Akron Public Schools, implementing cost-saving reform of retiree supplemental health benefits, securing approval of First Consent Decree Amendment resulting in $56.7 million in CSO savings; securing nationally competitive $5 million TIGER grant to redevelop Main Street and leading successful effort to bring Stark State Community College campus to Akron.

Additionally, Horrigan was recognized by Cleveland Magazine's Community Leader Power 100 – List of most influential leaders in Northeast Ohio. He joined the coalition of Mayors across the U.S. in the Mayors Against Illegal Guns. In order to further his goal of improving the health of the community, Mayor Horrigan he partnered with Akron Children's Hospital-Akron Marathon Race Series, County of Summit and Summit County Public Health to launch a citywide 100 Million Steps Walking Challenge.

==== 2019 election ====
May 7, 2019 primary election
Candidate	Total votes	Percentage of Votes
Daniel Horrigan	10,993	78.50%
Greg Harrison	3,011	21.50%

This was the first May primary in Akron in 70 years due to a voter-approved change in primary dates.

==== 2023 election ====
Horrigan announced that he would not seek a third term in 2023, instead endorsing deputy mayor Marco Sommerville for the seat.

Political offices
Preceded by Jeff Fusco	Mayor of Akron, Ohio; 2016–2024	Succeeded by Shammas Malik
