= Don Plusquellic =

American mayor

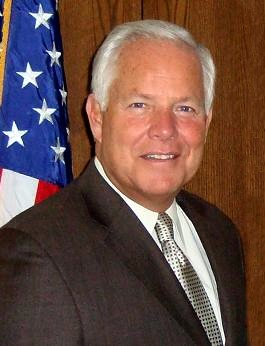

59th Mayor of Akron, Ohio
- In office January 1, 1987 – May 31, 2015
- Preceded by: Thomas C. Sawyer
- Succeeded by: Garry Moneypenny (interim)

62nd President of the United States Conference of Mayors
- In office 2004–2005
- Preceded by: James Garner
- Succeeded by: Beverly O'Neill

Personal details
- Born: Donald Lee Plusquellic; July 3, 1949 (age 77) Akron, Ohio, U.S.
- Party: Democratic
- Education: Bowling Green University (BS) University of Akron (JD)
- Profession: Management

Donald L. Plusquellic (born July 3, 1949) is an American politician who served as mayor of Akron, Ohio. First elected in 1987, he became the 59th Mayor of Akron after previously serving 13 years on Akron City Council. Plusquellic has served his seventh term, making him the longest-serving mayor of the city. Plusquellic announced his resignation effective May 31, 2015, citing unfriendly coverage from the Akron Beacon Journal as his primary motivation.

== Personal life and early career ==
Plusquellic was born in Akron, Ohio, on July 3, 1949. He graduated from Kenmore High School in Akron, and enrolled at the Swanson School of Engineering at the University of Pittsburgh before switching to the Bowling Green State University College of Business Administration, where he received his Bachelor of Science degree in 1972. He played football at Bowling Green. He later received his JD from the University of Akron School of Law in 1982, and went into private practice. He continued to practice law after being elected to the Akron City Council, but ceased after being elected Mayor of Akron in 1987.

Plusquellic married the former Mary Goffee in 1972, and they had a son, David, and a daughter, Michelle. The couple divorced in 2007. Mary Plusquellic, a drug and alcohol counselor, died of cardiac problems at her home in July 2013.

== Mayor of Akron ==
Plusquellic was the President of the United States Conference of Mayors during 2004. Plusquellic currently serves as vice president of the International Mayors for Peace organization. He is well known as an architect of the Joint Economic Development District (JEDD) program in Ohio, and he is a member of the Mayors Against Illegal Guns Coalition, a bi-partisan group with a stated goal of "making the public safer by getting illegal guns off the streets." The Coalition is co-chaired by Boston, Massachusetts Mayor Thomas Menino, New York City Mayor Michael Bloomberg, and Columbus, Ohio Mayor Michael B. Coleman.

Throughout his tenure as mayor, Plusquellic often suggested bold, outsize ideas which energized his supporters. He proposed leasing the city water system to a contractor and using the payments to pay college tuition cost for Akron residents, suggested forming a city-owned construction company to bid on projects and generate revenue for the town, and advocated construction of a baseball stadium at a time when there was little to no support for it. (This stadium, Canal Park, was completed in 1997.)

Plusquellic also focused on more mundane issues, such as encouraging large employers to stay in Akron and successfully advocating for an income tax increase to boost school renovation and construction.

Critics accused Plusquellic of abusing his power. In July 2005, he argued with a downtown Akron parking attendant, and threatened to revoke the business license of the attendant's employer if the attendant was not fired (the company complied). Plusquellic later apologized, and surrendered a day's pay to the city. Cleveland Plain-Dealer columnist Mark Naymik criticized Plusquellic for engaging in "ego-driven politics" that won him re-election and notice from the press but which did little for Akron, allowing the city's finances to decline.

President Barack Obama selected Plusquellic to work with a team of mayors from across America to work on solving the 2008 financial crisis at the local level. In February 2009, Plusquellic was one of 20 mayors who went to Washington, D.C., to discuss committing stimulus money to go directly to city governments to fund infrastructure.

A campaign to recall the mayor was initiated in March 2009. In a special election in June 2009, Plusquellic was kept by a vote of 20,500 to 7,200 with almost 99 percent of precincts reporting.

Plusquellic led a delegation from Akron to meet with representatives of Mekorot, the Israeli water company, in 2012. The meeting led to an announcement that Mekorot would be opening its first U.S. office in Akron through Akron's Global Business Accelerator. The office will coordinate information exchange relating to water security, water technology and energy technology, with an ultimate objective of commercializing joint ventures, creating jobs, and developing the economy.

== See also ==
- List of longest-serving United States mayors

Political offices
Preceded by Thomas C. Sawyer	Mayor of Akron, Ohio; 1987–2015	Succeeded by Garry Moneypenny
