= List of mayors of Akron, Ohio =

This is a list of mayors of Akron, Ohio, a city in the northeastern part of the U.S. state of Ohio located in Summit County. The newly elected mayor assumes office at midnight on New Year's Day according to recent practice. From 1920 to 1924 a new charter established City commission government led by an administrator.

== Pre-Commission Mayors of Akron ==
Term	Mayor
1836	Seth Iredell
1837–1838	John C. Singletary
1839	Lucius V. Bierce
1840	Arad Kent
1841	Lucius V. Bierce (2)
1842–1843	H. H. Johnston
1844	Lucius V. Bierce (3)
1845–1846	Philo Chamberlin
1847	Levi Rawson
1848	Israel E. Carter
1849	Lucius V. Bierce (4)
1850	George Bliss
1851	Charles G. Ladd
1852	Frederick Wadsworth
1853	Philip N. Schuyler
1854	William T. Allen
1855	Nathaniel Finch
1856–1858	Frederick A. Nash
1859	George W. McNeil
1860–1861	Henry Purdy
1862–1863	Charles A. Collins
1864	George D. Bates
1865–1866	James Matthews
1867–1868	Lucius V. Bierce (5)
1869–1872	John L. Robertson
1873–1874	Henry Purdy
1875–1876	Levi S. Herrold
1877–1878	James F. Scott
1879–1880	John M. Fraze
1881–1882	Samuel A. Lane
1883–1886	Lorenzo D. Watters
1887–1888	Louis D. Seward
1889–1892	William H. Miller
1893–1894	Lorenzo D. Watters
1895–1896	E. R. Harper
1897–1900	W. E. Young
1901–1902	W. B. Doyle
1903–1907	Charles W. Kemple
1908–1911	William T. Sawyer
1912–1915	Frank W. Rockwell
1916–1917	William J. Laub
1918–1919	I. S. Myers (1)

== Administrators of Akron ==
Term	Administrator
1920–1921	Carl F. Beck
1922	D. C. Rybolt
1922	Homer Campbell
1922–1923	M. P. Tucker

== Post-Commission Mayors of Akron ==
Term	Image	Mayor
1924-1927		M. P. Tucker (2)
1928–1931		G. Lloyd Weil
1932–1933		C. Nelson Sparks
1934–1935		I. S. Myers (2)
1936–1941		Lee D. Schroy
1942–1943		George J. Harter
1944–1952		Charles E. Slusser
1953		Russell M. Bird
1954–1961		Leo A. Berg
1962–1965		Edward O. Erickson
1966–1979		John S. Ballard
1980–1983		Roy Ray
1984–1986		Thomas C. Sawyer
1987–May 2015		Donald L. Plusquellic
May–June 2015		Garry Moneypenny (interim)
June 2015–January 2016		Jeff Fusco (interim)
2016–2024		Dan Horrigan
2024–		Shammas Malik
