= Killing of Jayland Walker =

2022 police shooting of a black man in Akron, Ohio

- Date: June 27, 2022; 4 years ago
- Time: ≈ 12:30 a.m. (EDT; UTC−4)
- Location: Akron, Ohio, U.S.
- Type: Homicide by shooting, police killing
- Participants: Eight unnamed officers, previously on paid administrative leave
- Deaths: Jayland Walker

On June 27, 2022, at approximately 12:30 a.m., Akron, Ohio, police officers shot Jayland Walker, a 25-year-old American from Akron. Following an attempted traffic stop and car chase, footage showed an officer saying that Walker’s car was slowing down after reaching speeds of more than 50 miles per hour (80 km/h) in a residential area. Seconds later, Walker, wearing a ski mask, exited the vehicle and began to flee on foot. Officers pursued on foot and fired more than 90 times at Walker. Autopsy results showed that Walker's body was hit by more than 46 bullets.

Walker was not carrying a weapon when killed. A handgun was later found in Walker's car, and officers reported a firearm being discharged during the preceding car chase. Police said a bullet casing consistent with the recovered Glock handgun (which Walker purchased from a gun store in Akron approximately a week before his death) was found in the area where they say a shot was fired (the southbound entrance ramp to State Route 8 at Tallmadge Avenue).

A grand jury voted for a "no bill" on charges for the officers involved, with Ohio attorney general Dave Yost stating "The grand jury concluded officers were legally justified in their use of force".

On October 21, 2024, Akron settled with the family of Walker for $4.85 million.

== Background ==
At approximately 2:30 a.m. on June 26, 2022, a New Franklin police officer attempted to pull over a vehicle owned by Walker, because the car had a broken taillight and a missing license plate bulb. The driver failed to stop and drove at speeds approaching 50 mph on city streets before crossing the Akron city line into Coventry Township, at which point the pursuing officer ended the less-than-three-minute chase.

== Incident ==
According to the Akron Police Department, at approximately 12:30 a.m. on June 27, 2022, police in Akron, Ohio, attempted to stop Walker for a traffic violation on unspecified equipment failure. Walker did not stop and a chase ensued. According to the pursuing officers, gunfire came from the vehicle less than a minute into the chase. After several minutes, Walker exited the highway and the chase continued along city streets.

Eventually, Walker's car slowed down, and while the car was still moving, Walker, wearing a ski mask, exited from the passenger's side, and ran towards a nearby parking lot. Officers chased Walker and attempted to stop him with a stun gun but were not successful. After about ten seconds of chasing Walker, eight police officers opened fire for six or seven seconds, shooting approximately 90 rounds. Police said that it appeared Walker was turning towards them, and they believed he was armed and "moving into a firing position".

Following the shooting, Walker was put in handcuffs by police and was found with his hands cuffed behind his back when EMTs arrived on the scene. According to police, officers attempted to administer first aid to Walker after he was shot. Walker was pronounced dead at the scene. No firearm was found on Walker's body. The Summit County Medical Examiner’s Office has ruled his death a homicide.

On July 15, 2022, the medical examiner released autopsy results. Walker's body was hit with 46 bullets in total, and the toxicology report showed that no drugs or alcohol were present in his system.

== Investigation ==
Police recovered a pistol, a loaded magazine, and a wedding ring on the driver's seat of Walker's car. A bullet casing that police say is consistent with the recovered pistol was found along the highway in the area where police say Walker fired.

The eight officers who opened fire were placed on paid administrative leave following standard protocol in a police shooting. On October 11, the officers were reinstated to administrative duties. Police Chief Steve Mylett said he was forced to do so because of a shortage of officers. The Ohio Bureau of Criminal Investigation led the probe into the shooting.

On April 17, 2023, a grand jury declined to file charges against any of the officers involved.

== Body camera footage ==
On July 3, 2022, police held a press conference and released body camera video from the eight officers who opened fire, as well as five additional officers on the scene.

At the press conference, police displayed still images that they say showed a muzzle flash coming from Walker's vehicle during the highway chase.

Police also displayed still images that they say showed Walker reaching towards his waist area during the foot chase, turning towards an officer, and making "a forward motion of his arm".

The body camera footage released by police ends after the officers opened fire and does not depict what happened afterwards.

== Reactions ==
The day of the shooting, protesters gathered outside the police department in downtown Akron. Standoffs with police and tense moments occurred. Barricades were installed around the police department on July 2. Protests went on for more than three days straight.

Akron officials announced that the July 4 celebrations would be cancelled due to the shooting. Akron mayor Dan Horrigan declared a state of emergency and issued a curfew for the downtown Akron area in response to property destruction during night-time riots. The curfew was lifted on July 17, 2022.

In November 2022 voters approved creating a permanent police oversight board and police auditor for the Akron Police Department.

=== Family reaction to grand jury decision ===
The Walker family attorney, Bobby DiCello: Walker’s family is going to prepare a civil lawsuit against the city/officers closer to the one-year anniversary of Jayland Walker's death (his client's death). On April 19, protesters broke windows at three restaurants in the Highland Square neighborhood, Wally Waffle, Chipotle, and Irie Jamaican Kitchen.

=== Police confrontation ===
In April 2023, US District Magistrate Judge James Grimes Jr. signed an agreement between the city and the Akron Bail Fund, an activist group that had sued the city after officers reportedly used pepper spray and tear gas against a group of protestors marching along Copley Road. Clevelands's deputy law director, John Christopher Reece, claimed in court that the protestors were blocking the road and restricting access for police and firefighters attempting to cross the city to reach hospitals. Fire Chief John Nakto claimed that Copley Road was used, on average, 12 times a day to get to emergencies. The city disputed that the protest was peaceful, however no evidence was brought to back up the claim.

== See also ==
- Lists of killings by law enforcement officers in the United States
