= Lexipol =

American law enforcement training company

Lexipol LLC
- Company type: Private
- Industry: Law enforcement; Fire department; Public safety
- Founded: 2003; 23 years ago in California
- Founders: Bruce Praet; Gordon Graham; Dan Merkle
- Headquarters: Aliso Viejo, California; Frisco, Texas
- Key people: Jack Blaha (CEO)
- Products: policy manuals, daily training bulletins, consulting and implementation services
- Owner: GTCR
- Number of employees: 200+
- Website: lexipol.com, policeone.com, ems1.com, corrections1.com

Lexipol LLC is a private company based in Frisco, Texas, that provides policy manuals, training bulletins, and consulting services to law enforcement agencies, fire departments, and other public safety departments. In 2019, 3,500 agencies in 35 U.S. states used Lexipol manuals or subscribed to their services. Lexipol states that it services 8,100 agencies as of March 2020. Lexipol retains copyright over all manuals they create, even those modified by local agencies, but does not take on the status of policymaker. Critics note that a decision made by Lexipol becomes policy in thousands of agencies and that there is little transparency into how the policy decisions are made.

== Founding ==
Bruce Praet, a California attorney and former law enforcement officer, began Lexipol in 2003 with Gordon Graham, a former law enforcement officer and law school graduate, and Dan Merkle, a corporate executive who became Lexipol's first Chairman and CEO. As a partner in the law firm of Ferguson, Praet and Sherman, Praet had worked with the Fullerton, California, police department to create a California law enforcement manual, which he then used as a model to create a policy manual for the Escalon, California, police department. As the number of manuals being supported grew, Praet set up Lexipol and transferred the policy development work to his new company. In November 2023, a Lexipol spokesperson said that Praet "no longer works with Lexipol".

== Expansion ==
Lexipol is based in Frisco, Texas. Marketing its products and services to law enforcement agencies and to municipal liability insurers, Lexipol's focus is on reducing liability risks and avoiding litigation. From 40 California agencies in 2003, Lexipol's business has expanded to 3,500 agencies in 35 states in 2019, including police, sheriff, fire department, and other public safety agencies, making it the dominant private provider in the market. More than 90 percent of law enforcement agencies in California are Lexipol clients. Graham said the Lexipol concept became successful when police liability insurers became interested. Initially creating law enforcement manuals, Lexipol added policy manuals and subscriptions for fire departments; the Minnesota State Fire Chiefs Association endorsed a Minnesota Fire Policy Manual from Lexipol in 2014. In 2020, the Marine Corps Fire and Emergency Services at Marine Corps Logistics Base Barstow became the first USMC agency to subscribe to Lexipol.

Orange County Business Journal ranked Lexipol the 24th fastest-growing private company in Orange County in 2010, and Deloitte ranked it 387 on its list of Technology Fast 500 in 2012.

The Riverside Company, a private equity firm, purchased Lexipol in 2014. In 2019, Lexipol merged with Praetorian Digital, which brought with it multiple news media sites and online learning academies. Police1, which produces original articles and news tailored to a police audience, is among the websites in Lexipol Media Group. The company saw an increase in interest in 2020, prompted by orders like that of New York Governor Andrew Cuomo in response to George Floyd protests that began in Minneapolis. In 2021, Lexipol was acquired by the private equity firm GTCR.

In December 2020, Lexipol acquired Cordico, a wellness technology firm, and in February, 2023, it acquired National Emergency Responder & Public Safety Center, which offers clinician courses and certification.

== Services ==
Lexipol offers policy manuals with an updating service, daily training bulletins, and implementation services, as well as online learning, wellness resources, and grant services. Lexipol offers their services to police departments, fire/EMS departments, county jails, and city governments. Safety personnel training familiarizes officers with new policies and their real-world applications, tracking their understanding and completion with questions at the end of exercises.

Although officer participation in the training component is verifiable and satisfies some states’ Peace Officer Standards and Training requirements, the daily training bulletins were not certified by California's Commission on Peace Officer Standards and Training "as sufficient to satisfy their minimum standards for state law enforcement training". Lexipol's services are widely used by small- and medium-sized departments that lack the resources to create or update their own policy manuals. Departments see Lexipol as a mean of mitigating risk and reducing staff hours spent updating policy.

The policy manuals provided by Lexipol can be customized by the contracting agency. Updates to the policy manual are presented to agencies in a mark-up form, allowing them to accept, reject or customize as needed.

Lexipol holds the copyright to all policies, even those modified or amended by the contracting agency, and Lexipol requires contracting agencies to sign an indemnification clause, stating "We only suggest content". Lexipol's contracts state that Lexipol is not the policymaker; the agency representative who adopts the policy manual certifies themselves as the policymaker. The City and County of San Francisco Sheriff's Department retained Lexipol to consult on a new use of force policy, but ended the deal on advice from San Francisco City Attorney's Office which told Lexipol, "Lexipol's ownership of copyrighted material and related derivative works language was unacceptable."

Through its PoliceOne Academy, Lexipol offers online training courses, certified by the International Association of Directors of Law Enforcement.

In 2021, Lexipol announced its new platform for local government policies at the municipality and county levels.

== Public reactions ==
UCLA law professors Ingrid Eagly and Joanna Schwartz, in a study published in Texas Law Review, noted that scholars and experts "have viewed police policies as a tool to constrain officer discretion and to improve officer decision making. Lexipol, in contrast, promotes its policies as a risk-management tool that can reduce legal liability." Eagly and Schwartz identified the lack of transparency in the decision-making process and development of policies as a major concern as local jurisdictions get little information on why decisions were made, what evidence was considered in drafting them, or what plausible alternatives might be. They also stated that "Lexipol offers a valuable service, particularly for smaller law enforcement agencies that are without the resources to draft and update policies on their own."

A journalist for The Desert Sun stated "While Lexipol can boost small departments' confidence that their policies are effective, working with a private company poses challenges to transparency in policymaking."

The study by Eagly and Schwartz also called out the danger of "mass standardization of police policies across jurisdictions and less opportunity to assess the efficacy of different approaches". Because of the wide adoption of Lexipol manuals, "policy decisions [by Lexipol] have an oversized influence on American policing". Policy and data analyst Samuel Sinyangwe observed that any decision made by Lexipol then becomes policy in thousands of agencies. Scott Morris writes in The Appeal, "a large portion of American police policy is now being drafted by a little-known private company with no public oversight" and quotes Andrea Pritchard, a police review commissioner and the founder of Berkeley Copwatch, saying the Lexipol policies are "designed for maximum protection against civil liability. It’s not maximum protection of civil rights." Morris also notes that Lexipol responded to the model policy on use of force produced by eleven law enforcement organizations, National Consensus Policy on Use of Force, by recommending that its clients make no changes to Lexipol's policies. In a report on fatal shootings by police in Citrus Heights, California, which uses Lexipol policies, reporters stated that federally recognized use-of-force expert Ed Obayashi said "off-the-shelf" policies may be legally sound but not reflect community values or expectations.

In 2017, the ACLU of California sent a letter to Lexipol demanding changes in some of its policies that the ACLU stated "can lead to racial profiling and harassment of immigrants", identifying several examples of unclear or misleading language. The Los Angeles Times reported that even sanctuary cities are using Lexipol policy manuals that contain guidance on immigration enforcement, including language to consider lack of English proficiency as a possible criterion, although some departments removed that language. Madison Pauly, writing in Mother Jones, states that Lexipol founder Praet alluded to working with members of the California legislature on the California Act to Save Lives that was enacted in 2019, and quotes Praet as saying "We—law enforcement—got 95 percent of what we needed out of [the bill]."

In 2018, Spokane settled a lawsuit for unlawful detention. According to the letter sent to Washington agencies by the ACLU of Washington and the Northwest Immigrant Rights Project, "Spokane’s Lexipol policy incorrectly authorized officers to seize individuals and extend detentions for purposes of investigating and aiding in potential civil immigration enforcement, unnecessarily exposing the City to liability".

After a white South Bend, Indiana, police officer shot and killed Eric Logan, an African-American man, in June 2019, then-mayor Pete Buttigieg was drawn from his presidential campaign to focus on the emerging public reaction. Body cameras were not turned on during Logan's death, based on South Bend's Lexipol policy manual. In an interview, Samuel Sinyangwe, a policy and data analyst focused on police reform, said "There were some shortcuts taken by the city of South Bend to write their policy that many cities across the country are taking but that, frankly, are not consistent with a commitment to ending police violence. What they did was they decided to contract with a private corporation called Lexipol to write the policy for them. Lexipol is a company that makes money selling policies to police departments." Bill McAuliffe, speaking for Lexipol, said "The whole philosophy of Lexipol policy content is we give them a solid foundation of well-written, legally researched and vetted policy. And then the agency needs to take it the next step and customize it to make sure that it's applicable, practical and functional for their organization's purposes."

In 2020, the governor of New York required the state's police agencies to modernize their strategies and programs by April 2021. The mayor of Saranac Lake said the village's police chief had identified Lexipol as a solution. The mayor said, "given all the executive orders and new directives, we have got to step back, get some professional help, engage the public, and reformulate our policies and procedures.”

Several departments in Ohio are rewriting their Lexipol policies to meet the certification standards of the Ohio Collaborative. In Peekskill, New York, when the police chief requested hiring Lexipol, a city council member opposed the request on the basis that Lexipol's policies prioritize avoiding discipline for violent police officers rather than increasing accountability, and said "We don’t need policies that decrease our settlement payout amounts, we need policies that will put the financial burden on the individuals causing the harm and stop holding taxpayers hostage to defending their abuse of power."

On February 11, 2025, a group of hackers calling themself Puppygirl Hacker Polycule breached Lexipol in a hacktivist effort against police. The group published 8,500 of Lexipol's documents, including drafts and privatized policy, procedural, and training documents. Additionally, the group released customer information, including names, usernames, agency names, hashed passwords, physical addresses, email addresses, and phone numbers. The breach was published through Distributed Denial of Secrets.

== See also ==
- Privatization in criminal justice
