= 1965–1966 Columbus murders =

Unsolved serial murder case in Ohio, U.S.

Columbus murders

Details
- Victims: 3
- Span of crimes: September 3, 1965 – May 23, 1966
- Country: United States
- State: Ohio
- Date apprehended: N/A

The Columbus murders are a series of shootings that occurred in Columbus, Ohio, and its surrounding areas between 1965 and 1966, leaving three men dead in a span of four shootings. The male victims were connected to one another via ballistic evidence, but despite one of the victim's survival and a facial composite being drawn of his assailant, no suspect was ever identified and all cases remain cold to this day.

== Attack on Raymond Sigler ==
The first recorded shooting occurred on September 3, 1965, when 48-year-old gas station attendant Raymond Sigler of Pataskala, Ohio, was ambushed by an intruder at his workplace in the eastern outskirts of Columbus. During the attack, Sigler, who was partially paralyzed from childhood polio, was shot once in the jaw and back, but pretended to be deceased and tricked his assailant into leaving. After spending several months in hospital, he was allowed to return to his apartment. He provided a description of his attacker, whom he described as a young white man in his early 20s or 30s, but as this was considered a very general description, it was not considered useful by law enforcement.

== Murders ==
=== Joseph Scowden ===
In the early morning hours of October 2, Patrolman Robert Holmes went inside the Certified Oil Co. gas station near Franklin University (where a McDonald's currently sits as of 2025), only to find the attendant, 19-year-old Chester Joseph Scowden of Columbus, lying dead on the floor. Scowden, a one-time Golden Gloves champion with a wife and two children, had been shot twice with a .25 caliber pistol – once in the heart, and once in the back of the head. His wallet and $80 were found to be missing, which indicated that this might have been a robbery.

From the outset, both authorities and acquaintances of Scowden stated their belief that the victim probably knew his attacker, as they considered it unlikely that he would open the door to a stranger. A $1,000 reward was offered for any information that might lead to an arrest.

=== Claude F. Quesenberry ===
On the early morning of November 11, Robert Quesenberry went to pick up his 41-year-old brother Claude from his job at the Kocelene Oil Co. gas station in West Jefferson, only to find that the latter had been shot to death. Claude, a WWII veteran and a recipient of the Purple Heart, had started work at the station just a few days prior and was not known to have caused any issues. An autopsy determined that he had been shot a total of four times – thrice in the back of the head and once in the body. While some money had been stolen from him and the cash register, the killer had apparently left behind a noticeable amount of money on the body, which left investigators to doubt whether robbery was the actual motive.

Due to the similarities between the Scowden and Quesenberry slayings, both of which were committed with a .25 caliber weapon, the authorities considered the possibility that they might have been committed by the same perpetrator. Bullets from the crime scenes were sent to the Ohio Bureau of Criminal Investigation, which positively determined that the same weapon had been used in both murders, officially linking the Scowden and Quesenberry cases to one killer.

=== Loren Bollinger ===
On the night between May 22 and 23, 1966, the owner of a recording company in downtown Columbus found the body of 40-year-old Loren E. Bollinger, an assistant professor in aeronautical engineering who had rented an office in the same building, slumped on the staircase. Bollinger, who had recently resigned from the Ohio State University to start his own consulting firm, had been shot a total of five times – once in the left shoulder and in the hip, and three times in the head. At the time of discovery, he had only 52 cents in his pockets, but as he was not known to carry large sums of money around with him, robbery could not be considered a completely solid motive.

Initially believed to be an isolated incident, ballistic expertise linked his murder to that of Scowden and Quesenberry. At the same time, authorities denied any connections to the unsolved murder of Lisabeth "Lisa" Davenport, a British-born beauty pageant whose bullet-riddled body was found stuffed in the trunk of a car in Findlay on May 6.

== Investigation and status ==
Unlike the previous victims, Bollinger's death generated a lot of publicity, especially as he was well-regarded in the scientific community. Both news media and police officials speculated that he might have come into contact with his killer because of his alleged homosexual inclinations, but this could not be conclusively proven. Around this time, speculations began to arise about the motives for the murders, with some suggesting that the killer did them out of thrill seeking rather than robbery.

In June 1966, officers from the Columbus Police Department resorted to using wanted posters plastered on billboards in an attempt to gather information on the killer. According to their facial composite, the suspect was believed to be between 30 and 35 years of age; 5 ft 9 in (175 cm); between 170 and 200 lb (77 and 91 kg); had no noticeable scars or marks and drove a gray 1960–1961 Chevrolet Corvette. Since then, no updates have been released on the case, and all three murders remain unsolved.

== See also ==
- List of fugitives from justice who disappeared
- List of serial killers in the United States
