= List of law enforcement agencies in Ohio =

This is a list of law enforcement agencies in the state of Ohio.

According to the US Bureau of Justice Statistics' 2008 Census of State and Local Law Enforcement Agencies, the state had 831 law enforcement agencies employing 25,992 sworn police officers, about 225 for each 100,000 residents.

== State agencies ==
- Ohio Attorney General
  - Ohio Bureau of Criminal Investigation
- Ohio State Auditor
- Ohio Board of Pharmacy
- Ohio Casino Control Commission
- Ohio Department of Commerce
  - Ohio State Fire Marshal
- Ohio Department of Developmental Disabilities
  - Cambridge Developmental Center
  - Columbus Developmental Center
  - Gallipolis Developmental Center
  - Mount Vernon Developmental Center
  - Northwest Ohio Developmental Center
  - Southwest Ohio Developmental Center
  - Tiffin Developmental Center
  - Warrensville Developmental Center
- Ohio Department of Mental Health and Addiction Services
  - Appalachian Behavioral Healthcare
  - Heartland Behavioral Healthcare
  - Northcoast Behavioral Healthcare
  - Northwest Ohio Psychiatric Hospital
  - Summit Behavioral Healthcare
  - Twin Valley Behavioral Healthcare
- Ohio Department of Natural Resources
  - Division of Parks and Watercraft
  - Division of Wildlife
  - Office of Law Enforcement
- Ohio Department of Public Safety
  - Ohio State Highway Patrol
    - Investigative Unit
    - Highway Patrol Police
- Ohio Department of Rehabilitation and Corrections
  - Ohio Adult Parole Authority
- Ohio Department of Taxation
- Ohio Department of Veterans Services
  - Veterans Home Police Department
- Ohio House of Representatives
  - Sergeant at Arms
- Ohio Senate
  - Sergeant at Arms

== County agencies ==
Ohio has 88 counties, each with its own elected county sheriff.

- Adams County Sheriff's Office
- Allen County Sheriff's Office
- Ashland County Sheriff's Office
- Ashtabula County Sheriff's Office
- Athens County Sheriff's Office
- Auglaize County Sheriff's Office
- Belmont County Sheriff's Office
- Brown County Sheriff's Office
- Butler County Sheriff's Office
- Carroll County Sheriff's Office
- Champaign County Sheriff's Office
- Clark County Sheriff's Office
- Clermont County Sheriff's Office
- Clinton County Sheriff's Office
- Columbiana County Sheriff's Office
- Coshocton County Sheriff's Office
- Crawford County Sheriff's Office
- Cuyahoga County Sheriff's Office
- Darke County Sheriff's Office
- Defiance County Sheriffs Office
- Delaware County Sheriff's Office
- Erie County Sheriff's Office
- Fairfield County Sheriff's Office
- Fayette County Sheriff's Office
- Franklin County Sheriff's Office
- Fulton County Sheriff's Office
- Gallia County Sheriff's Office
- Geauga County Sheriff's Office
- Greene County Sheriff's Office
- Guernsey County Sheriff's Office
- Hamilton County Sheriff's Office
- Hancock County Sheriff's Office
- Hardin County Sheriff's Office
- Harrison County Sheriff's Office
- Henry County Sheriff's Office
- Highland County Sheriff's Office
- Hocking County Sheriff's Office
- Holmes County Sheriff's Office
- Huron County Sheriff's Office
- Jackson County Sheriff's Office
- Jefferson County Sheriff's Office
- Knox County Sheriff's Office
- Lake County Sheriff's Office
- Lawrence County Sheriff's Office
- Licking County Sheriff's Office
- Logan County Sheriff's Office
- Lorain County Sheriff's Office
- Lucas County Sheriff's Office
- Madison County Sheriff's Office
- Mahoning County Sheriff's Office
- Marion County Sheriff's Office
- Medina County Sheriff's Office
- Meigs County Sheriff's Office
- Mercer County Sheriff's Office
- Miami County Sheriff's Office
- Monroe County Sheriff's Office
- Montgomery County Sheriff's Office
- Morgan County Sheriff's Office
- Morrow County Sheriff's Office
- Muskingum County Sheriff's Office
- Noble County Sheriff's Office
- Ottawa County Sheriff's Office
- Paulding County Sheriff's Office
- Perry County Sheriff's Office
- Pickaway County Sheriff's Office
- Pike County Sheriff's Office
- Portage County Sheriff's Office
- Preble County Sheriff's Office
- Putnam County Sheriff's Office
- Richland County Sheriff's Office
- Ross County Sheriff's Office
- Sandusky County Sheriff's Office
- Scioto County Sheriff's Office
- Seneca County Sheriff's Office
- Shelby County Sheriff's Office
- Stark County Sheriff's Office
- Summit County Sheriff's Office
- Trumbull County Sheriff's Office
- Tuscarawas County Sheriff's Office
- Union County Sheriff's Office
- Van Wert County Sheriff's Office
- Vinton County Sheriff's Office
- Warren County Sheriff's Office
- Washington County Sheriff's Office
- Wayne County Sheriff's Office
- Williams County Sheriff's Office
- Wood County Sheriff's Office
- Wyandot County Sheriff's Office

== Municipal agencies ==
- Aberdeen Police Department
- Ada Police Department
- Adena Police Department
- Akron Police Department
- Albany Police Department
- Alexandria Police Department
- Alliance Police Department
- Amberley Village Police Department
- Amesville Police Department
- Amherst Police Department
- Amsterdam Police Department
- Andover Police Department
- Anna Police Department
- Ansonia Police Department
- Antwerp Police Department
- Apple Creek Police Department
- Arcanum Police Department
- Archbold Police Department
- Ashland Police Department
- Ashley Police Department
- Ashtabula Police Department
- Ashville Police Department
- Athalia Police Department
- Athens Police Department
- Aurora Police Department
- Avon Police Department
- Avon Lake Police Department
- Baltimore Police Department
- Barberton Police Department
- Barnesville Police Department
- Batavia Police Department
- Bay View Police Department
- Bay Village Police Department
- Beach City Police Department
- Beachwood Police Department
- Beavercreek Police Department
- Bedford Police Department
- Bedford Heights Police Department
- Bellaire Police Department
- Bellbook Police Department
- Bellefontaine Police Department
- Bellevue Police Department
- Bellville Police Department
- Belmont Police Department
- Belmore Police Department
- Belpre Police Department
- Bentleyville Police Department
- Berea Police Department
- Bergholz Police Department
- Berkey Police Department
- Berlin Heights Police Department
- Bethel Police Department
- Bethesda Police Department
- Bettsville Police Department
- Beverly Police Department
- Bexley Police Department
- Blakeslee Police Department
- Blanchester Police Department
- Bloomdale Police Department
- Bloomingdale Police Department
- Bloomville Police Department
- Blue Ash Police Department
- Bluffton Police Department
- Bolivar Police Department
- Boston Heights Police Department
- Botkins Police Department
- Bowersville Police Department
- Bowling Green Police Department
- Bradner Police Department
- Bratenahl Police Department
- Brecksville Police Department
- Brewster Police Department
- Brice Police Department
- Bridgeport Police Department
- Broadview Heights Police Department
- Brook Park Police Department
- Brooklyn Police Department
- Brooklyn Heights Police Department
- Brookville Police Department
- Brunswick Police Department
- Bryan Police Department
- Buchtel Police Department
- Buckeye Lake Police Department
- Bucyrus Police Department
- Burton Police Department
- Butler Police Department
- Byesville Police Department
- Cadiz Police Department
- Cambridge Police Department
- Camden Police Department
- Campbell Police Department
- Canal Fulton Police Department
- Canfield Police Department
- Canton Police Department
- Cardington Police Department
- Carey Police Department
- Carlisle Police Department
- Carroll Police Department
- Carrollton Police Department
- Castalia Police Department
- Catawba Police Department
- Cedarville Police Department
- Celina Police Department
- Centerville Police Department
- Chagrin Falls Police Department
- Chardon Police Department
- Cherry Fork Police Department
- Chesapeake Police Department
- Cheviot Police Department
- Chillicothe Police Department
- Cincinnati Police Department
- Circleville Police Department
- Clay Center Police Department
- Clayton Police Department
- Cleveland Division of Police
- Cleveland Heights Police Department
- Clyde Police Department
- Coal Grove Police Department
- Coalton Police Department
- Coldwater Police Department
- Columbiana Police Department
- Columbus Division of Police
- Columbus Grove Police Department
- Commercial Point Police Department
- Conneaut Police Department
- Continental Police Department
- Convoy Police Department
- Coolville Police Department
- Corning Police Department
- Cortland Police Department
- Covington Police Department
- Craig Beach Police Department
- Crestline Police Department
- Creston Police Department
- Cridersville Police Department
- Crooksville Police Department
- Cuyahoga Falls Police Department
- Cuyahoga Heights Police Department
- Dalton Police Department
- Danville Police Department
- Dayton Police Department
- De Graff Police Department
- Deer Park Police Department
- Defiance Police Department
- Delaware Police Department
- Dellroy Police Department
- Delphos Police Department
- Delta Police Department
- Dennison Police Department
- Deshler Police Department
- Dillonvale Police Department
- Donnelsville Police Department
- Dover Police Department
- Doylestown Police Department
- Dresden Police Department
- Dublin Police Department
- East Canton Police Department
- East Cleveland Police Department
- East Liverpool Police Department
- East Palestine Police Department
- Eastlake Police Department
- Eaton Police Department
- Edgerton Police Department
- Edison Village Police Department
- Edon Police Department
- Elida Police Department
- Elmore Police Department
- Elmwood Place Police Department
- Elyria Police Department
- Empire Police Department
- Englewood Police Department
- Enon Police Department
- Euclid Police Department
- Evendale Police Department
- Fairborn Police Department
- Fairfax Police Department
- Fairfield Police Department
- Fairlawn Police Department
- Fairport Harbor Police Department
- Fairview Park Police Department
- Fayette Police Department
- Fayetteville Police Department
- Felicity Police Department
- Findlay Police Department
- Flushing Police Department
- Forest Police Department
- Forest Park Police Department
- Fort Jennings Police Department
- Fort Loramie Police Department
- Fort Recovery Police Department
- Fort Shawnee Police Department
- Fostoria Division of Police
- Franklin Division of Police
- Frazeysburg Police Department
- Fredericktown Police Department
- Fremont Police Department
- Gahanna Division of Police
- Galion Police Department
- Gallipolis Police Department
- Garfield Heights Police Department
- Garrettsville Police Department
- Gates Mills Police Department
- Genesis Police Department
- Geneva Police Department
- Geneva-on-the-Lake Police Department
- Genoa Police Department
- Georgetown Police Department
- Germantown Police Department
- Gibonsburg Police Department
- Girard Police Department
- Glandorf Police Department
- Glendale Police Department
- Glenmont Police Department
- Glenwillow Police Department
- Glouster Police Department
- Gnadenhutten Police Department
- Golf Manor Police Department
- Grafton Police Department
- Grand River Police Department
- Grandview Heights Division of Police
- Granville Police Department
- Gratis Police Department
- Green Springs Police Department
- Greenfield Police Department
- Greenhills Police Department
- Greenville Police Department
- Greenwich Police Department
- Grove City Division of Police
- Groveport Police Department
- Grover Hill Police Department
- Hamden Police Department
- Hamersville Police Department
- Hamilton Police Department
- Hanging Rock Police Department
- Hanoverton Police Department
- Harbor View Police Department
- Harrisburg Police Department
- Harrison Police Department
- Hartford Police Department
- Hartville Police Department
- Harveysburg Police Department
- Haskins Police Department
- Haviland Police Department
- Hayesville Police Department
- Heath Police Department
- Hebron Police Department
- Hicksville Police Department
- Higginsport Police Department
- Highland Police Department
- Highland Heights Police Department
- Highland Hills Police Department
- Hilliard Division of Police
- Hills and Dales Police Department
- Hillsboro Police Department
- Hinckley Police Department
- Hiram Police Department
- Holland Police Department
- Hubbard City Police Department
- Huber Heights Police Department
- Hudson Police Department
- Hunting Valley Police Department
- Huron Police Department
- Independence Police Department
- Indian Hill Police Department
- Ironton Police Department
- Jackson Police Department
- Jackson Center Police Department
- Jamestown Police Department
- Jefferson Police Department
- Jewett Police Department
- Johnstown Police Department
- Junction City Police Department
- Kalida Police Department
- Kellys Island Police Department
- Kent Police Department
- Kenton Police Department
- Kettering Police Department
- Kipton Police Department
- Kirkersville Police Department
- Kirtland Police Department
- Kirtland Hills Police Department
- LaGrange Police Department
- Lake Waynoka Police Department
- Lakemore Police Department
- Lakewood Police Department
- Lancaster Police Department
- Latty Police Department
- Lebanon Division of Police
- Leesburg Police Department
- Leetonia Police Department
- Leipsic Police Department
- Lewisburg Police Department
- Lexington Police Department
- Lima Police Department
- Linndale Police Department
- Lisbon Police Department
- Lithopolis Police Department
- Lockland Police Department
- Lodi Police Department
- Logan Police Department
- London Division of Police
- Lorain Police Department
- Lordstown Police Department
- Loudonville Police Department
- Louisville Police Department
- Loveland Police Department
- Lowell Police Department
- Lowellville Police Department
- Luckey Police Department
- Lynchburg Police Department
- Lyndhurst Police Department
- Macedonia Police Department
- Madeira Police Department
- Madison Police Department
- Magnolia Police Department
- Mansfield Division of Police
- Mantua Police Department
- Maple Heights Police Department
- Marblehead Police Department
- Mariemont Police Department
- Marietta Police Department
- Marion Police Department
- Marshallville Police Department
- Martins Ferry Police Department
- Martinsburg Police Department
- Marysville Division of Police
- Mason Police Department
- Massillon Police Department
- Maumee Police Department
- Mayfield Police Department
- Mayfield Heights Police Department
- McArthur Police Department
- McComb Police Department
- McConnelsville Police Department
- McDonald Police Department
- Mechanicsburg Police Department
- Medina Police Department
- Mentor Police Department
- Mentor-on-the-Lake Police Department
- Miamisburg Police Department
- Middleburg Heights Police Department
- Middlefield Police Department
- Middleport Police Department
- Middletown Division of Police
- Midvale Police Department
- Mifflin Police Department
- Milan Police Department
- Milford Police Department
- Millersburg Police Department
- Millersport Police Department
- Minerva Police Department
- Minerva Park Police Department
- Mingo Junction Police Department
- Minster Police Department
- Mogadore Police Department
- Monroe Police Department
- Monroeville Police Department
- Montgomery Police Department
- Montpelier Police Department
- Moraine Police Department
- Moreland Hills Police Department
- Morristown Police Department
- Morrow Police Department
- Mount Eaton Police Department
- Mount Gilead Police Department
- Mount Healthy Police Department
- Mount Orab Police Department
- Mount Pleasant Police Department
- Mount Vernon Police Department
- Munroe Falls Police Department
- Murray City Police Department
- Napoleon Police Department
- Nashville Police Department
- Navarre Police Department
- Nelsonville Police Department
- New Albany Police Department
- New Alexandria Police Department
- New Athens Police Department
- New Boston Police Department
- New Bremen Police Department
- New Concord Police Department
- New Franklin Police Department
- New Holland Police Department
- New Knoxville Police Department
- New Lebanon Police Department
- New Lexington Police Department
- New London Police Department
- New Madison Police Department
- New Matamoras Police Department
- New Miami Police Department
- New Middletown Police Department
- New Paris Police Department
- New Philadelphia Police Department
- New Richmond Police Department
- New Straitsville Police Department
- New Vienna Police Department
- New Washington Police Department
- New Waterford Police Department
- Newark Division of Police
- Newburgh Heights Police Department
- Newcomerstown Police Department
- Newton Falls Police Department
- Newtown Police Department
- Niles Police Department
- North Baltimore Police Department
- North Canton Police Department
- North College Hill Police Department
- North Hampton Police Department
- North Kingsville Police Department
- North Lewisburg Police Department
- North Olmsted Police Department
- North Perry Police Department
- North Randall Police Department
- North Ridgeville Police Department
- North Royalton Police Department
- Northfield Police Department
- Northwood Police Department
- Norton Police Department
- Norwalk Police Department
- Norwood Police Department
- Oak Harbor Police Department
- Oak Hill Police Department
- Oakwood Police Department (Cuyahoga County)
- Oakwood Police Department (Montgomery County)
- Oakwood Police Department (Paulding County)
- Oberlin Police Department
- Obetz Police Department
- Ohio City Police Department
- Olmsted Falls Police Department
- Ontario Police Department
- Orange Police Department
- Oregon Police Department
- Orrville Police Department
- Orwell Police Department
- Ostrander Police Department
- Ottawa Police Department
- Ottawa Hills Police Department
- Ottoville Police Department
- Owensville Police Department
- Oxford Police Department
- Painesville Police Department
- Pandora Police Department
- Parma Police Department
- Parma Heights Police Department
- Pataskala Division of Police
- Paulding Police Department
- Payne Police Department
- Peebles Police Department
- Pemberville Police Department
- Peninsula Police Department
- Pepper Pike Police Department
- Perry Police Department
- Perrysburg Police Department
- Phillipsburg Police Department
- Pickerington Police Department
- Piketon Police Department
- Pioneer Police Department
- Piqua Police Department
- Plain City Police Department
- Pleasantville Police Department
- Plymouth Police Department
- Poland Police Department
- Pomeroy Police Department
- Port Clinton Police Department
- Port Jefferson Police Department
- Port Washington Police Department
- Port William Police Department
- Portage Police Department
- Portsmouth Police Department
- Powell Police Department
- Powhatan Point Police Department
- Proctorville Police Department
- Put-in-Bay Police Department
- Racine Police Department
- Ravenna Police Department
- Rayland Police Department
- Reading Police Department
- Reminderville Police Department
- Republic Police Department
- Reynoldsburg Division of Police
- Richfield Police Department
- Richmond Police Department
- Richmond Heights Police Department
- Richwood Police Department
- Rio Grande Police Department
- Ripley Police Department
- Risingsun Police Department
- Rittman Police Department
- Riverside Police Department
- Roaming Shores Police Department
- Rockford Police Department
- Rocky Ridge Police Department
- Rocky River Police Department
- Roseville Police Department
- Rossford Police Department
- Roswell Police Department
- Russells Point Police Department
- Russellville Police Department
- Russia Police Department
- Rutland Police Department
- Sabina Police Department
- Salem Police Department
- Salineville Police Department
- Sandusky Police Department
  - Cedar Point Division
- Sardinia Police Department
- Scott Police Department
- Seaman Police Department
- Sebring Police Department
- Seven Hills Police Department
- Seven Mile Police Department
- Seville Police Department
- Shadyside Police Department
- Shaker Heights Police Department
- Sharonville Police Department
- Shawnee Police Department
- Shawnee Hills Police Department
- Sheffield Police Department
- Sheffield Lake Police Department
- Shelby Police Department
- Shreve Police Department
- Sidney Police Department
- Silver Lake Police Department
- Silverton Police Department
- Smithville Police Department
- Solon Police Department
- Somerset Police Department
- South Amherst Police Department
- South Bloomfield Police Department
- South Charleston Police Department
- South Euclid Police Department
- South Point Police Department
- South Russell Police Department
- South Solon Police Department
- South Vienna Police Department
- South Zanesville Police Department
- Spencer Police Department
- Spencerville Police Department
- Springboro Police Department
- Springdale Police Department
- Springfield Police Department
- St. Bernard Police Department
- St. Clairsville Police Department
- St. Henry Police Department
- St. Louisville Police Department
- St. Marys Police Department
- Steubenville Police Department
- Stow Police Department
- Strasburg Police Department
- Stratton Police Department
- Streetsboro Police Department
- Strongsville Police Department
- Struthers Police Department
- Stryker Police Department
- Sugar Grove Police Department
- Sugarcreek Police Department
- Sunbury Police Department
- Swanton Police Department
- Sycamore Police Department
- Sylvania Police Department
- Syracuse Police Department
- Tallmadge Police Department
- Terrace Park Police Department
- Thornville Police Department
- Tiffin Police Department
- Tiltonsville Police Department
- Timberlake Police Department
- Tipp City Police Department
- Toledo Police Department
- Toronto Police Department
- Tremont City Police Department
- Trenton Police Department
- Trimble Police Department
- Trotwood Police Department
- Troy Police Department
- Tuscarawas Police Department
- Twinsburg Police Department
- Uhrichsville Police Department
- Union Police Department
- Union City Police Department
- Uniontown Police Department
- University Heights Police Department
- Upper Arlington Division of Police
- Upper Sandusky Police Department
- Urbana Police Department
- Utica Police Department
- Valley View Police Department
- Valleyview Police Department
- Van Wert Police Department
- Vandalia Police Department
- Vermilion Police Department
- Verona Police Department
- Versailles Police Department
- Wadsworth Police Department
- Waite Hill Police Department
- Wakeman Police Department
- Walbridge Police Department
- Walton Hills Police Department
- Wapakoneta Police Department
- Warren Police Department
- Warrensville Heights Police Department
- Washington Court House Police Department
- Washingtonville Police Department
- Waterville Police Department
- Wauseon Police Department
- Waverly Police Department
- Wayne Police Department
- Waynesburg Police Department
- Waynesfield Police Department
- Waynesville Police Department
- Wellington Police Department
- Wellston Police Department
- Wellsville Police Department
- West Alexandria Police Department
- West Carrollton Police Department
- West Farmington Police Department
- West Jefferson Police Department
- West Lafayette Police Department
- West Liberty Police Department
- West Milton Police Department
- West Salem Police Department
- West Union Police Department
- West Unity Police Department
- Westerville Division of Police
- Westfield Center Police Department
- Westlake Police Department
- Whitehall Division of Police
- Whitehouse Police Department
- Wickliffe Police Department
- Willard Police Department
- Williamsburg Police Department
- Willoughby Police Department
- Willoughby Hills Police Department
- Willowick Police Department
- Wilmington Police Department
- Winchester Police Department
- Windham Police Department
- Wintersville Police Department
- Woodlawn Police Department
- Woodmere Police Department
- Woodsfield Police Department
- Woodville Police Department
- Wooster Police Department
- Worthington Division of Police
- Wyoming Police Department
- Xenia Police Division
- Yellow Springs Police Department
- Yorkville Police Department
- Youngstown Police Department
- Zaleski Police Department
- Zanesville Police Department

== Township agencies ==
- American Township Police Department
- Austintown Township Police Department
- Bainbridge Township Police Department
- Bath Township Police Department
- Bazetta Township Police Department
- Beaver Township Police Department
- Blendon Township Police Department
- Boardman Township Police Department
- Braceville Township Police Department
- Brimfield Township Police Department
- Brookfield Township Police Department
- Brunswick Hills Township Police Department
- Butler Township Police Department
- Carroll Township Police Department
- Catawba Island Township Police Department
- Center Township Police Department
- Champion Township Police Department
- Chester Township Police Department
- Clay Township Police Department (Montgomery County)
- Clay Township Police Department (Ottawa County)
- Clearcreek Township Police Department
- Clinton Township Police Department
- Coitsville Township Police Department
- Colerain Township Police Department
- Copley Township Police Department
- Cross Creek Township Police Department
- Danbury Township Police Department
- Delhi Township Police Department
- Fairfield Township Police Department
- Fowler Township Police Department
- Franklin Township Police Department
- Genoa Township Police Department
- German Township Police Department (Clark County)
- German Township Police Department (Montgomery County)
- Goshen Township Police Department (Clermont County)
- Goshen Township Police Department (Mahoning County)
- Green Township Police Department
- Hamilton Township Police Department
- Hartford Township Police Department
- Howland Township Police Department
- Hubbard Township Police Department
- Jackson Township Police Department (Mahoning County)
- Jackson Township Police Department (Montgomery County)
- Jackson Township Police Department (Stark County)
- Kinsman Township Police Department
- Lake Township Police Department
- Lawrence Township Police Department
- Liberty Township Police Department
- Liverpool Township Police Department
- Madison Township Police Department (Franklin County)
- Madison Township Police Department (Lake County)
- Marion Township Police Department
- Marlboro Township Police Department
- Medina Township Police Department
- Miami Township Police Department (Clermont County)
- Miami Township Police Department (Montgomery County)
- Mifflin Township Police Department
- Milton Township Police Department
- Montville Township Police Department
- Olmsted Township Police Department
- Oxford Township Police Department
- Pease Township Police Department
- Perkins Township Police Department
- Perry Township Police Department (Allen County)
- Perry Township Police Department (Columbiana County)
- Perry Township Police Department (Franklin County)
- Perry Township Police Department (Montgomery County)
- Perry Township Police Department (Stark County)
- Perrysburg Township Police Department
- Pierce Township Police Department
- Poland Township Police Department
- Richland Township Police Department
- Ross Township Police Department
- Russell Township Police Department
- Sagamore Hills Township Police Department
- Salem Township Police Department
- Saline Township Police Department
- Sharon Township Police Department
- Shawnee Township Police Department
- Smith Township Police Department
- Smithfield Township Police Department
- Springfield Township Police Department (Hamilton County)
- Springfield Township Police Department (Mahoning County)
- Springfield Township Police Department (Summit County)
- St. Clair Township Police Department
- Sugarcreek Township Police Department
- Sylvania Township Police Department
- Thompson Township Police Department
- Union Township Police Department (Clermont County)
- Union Township Police Department (Lawrence County)
- Vienna Township Police Department
- Warren Township Police Department
- Washington Township Police Department (Logan County)
- Washington Township Police Department (Lucas County)
- Waterville Township Police Department
- Weathersfield Township Police Department
- Wells Township Police Department
- West Chester Township Police Department

== College and university agencies ==
- Bowling Green State University Police - Bowling Green State University
- Capital University Police - Capital University
- Case Western Reserve University Police - Case Western Reserve University
- Central State University Police - Central State University
- Cincinnati State College Campus Police
- Cleveland State University Police - Cleveland State University
- Columbus State Community College Police - Columbus State Community College
- Cuyahoga Community College Police - Cuyahoga Community College
- Denison University Police
- Edison State Community College Police
- Hocking College Police- Hocking College
- John Carroll University Police Department - John Carroll University
- Kent State University Police - Kent State University
- Lakeland Community College Police Department - Lakeland Community College
- Malone University Police Department
- Marietta College Police Department - Marietta College
- Mount St. Joseph University Police Department - Mount St. Joseph University
- Muskingum College Police - Muskingum College
- Northwest State Community College Police
- Notre Dame College Police - Notre Dame College
- Ohio University Police Department - Ohio University
- Ohio Wesleyan University Police
- Otterbein University Police - Otterbein University
- Owens Community College Department of Public Safety - Owens Community College
- Shawnee State University Department of Public Safety - Shawnee State University
- Sinclair Community College Police - Sinclair Community College
- The Ohio State University Police - Ohio State University
- University of Akron Police - University of Akron
- University of Cincinnati Police - University of Cincinnati
- University of Dayton Police - University of Dayton
- University of Findlay Police - University of Findlay
- University of Rio Grande Police Department
- University of Toledo Police - University of Toledo
- Walsh University Police
- Wilberforce University Police
- Wittenberg University Police - Wittenberg University
- Wright State University Police - Wright State University
- Xavier University Police - Xavier University
- Youngstown State University Police - Youngstown State University

== Airport agencies ==
- Columbus Regional Airport Authority
- Dayton International Airport Police Department

== Hospital agencies ==
- Akron Children’s Hospital Police
- Cleveland Clinic Police Department
- Fairfield Medical Center Police
- Fisher Titus Medical Center Police
- Genesis Healthcare Police Department
- Humility of Mary Health Partners
- Kettering Health Police Department
- Licking Memorial Hospital Police Department
- Lima Memorial Hospital Police Department
- Lindner Center of HOPE Police Department
- Mercy Health Partners Public Safety Department
- Mercy Health Police Department - Lorain Hospital
- Mercy Regional Police
- MetroHealth Police Department
- Northcoast Behavioral Healthcare Police
  - Cleveland Campus
  - Northfield Campus
- Northeast Ohio Medical University Police Department
- Premier Health Department of Public Safety
- ProMedica Police Department
- Southwest General Police Department
- Springfield Regional Medical Center Police Department
- St. Rita’s Medical Center Police
- Summa Health Protective Services/Police
- Summit Behavioral Healthcare Police Department
- UC Health Department of Public Safety
- University Hospitals Police
  - Bedford Medical Center
  - Cleveland Medical Center
  - Portage Medical Center

== Park agencies ==
- Ballville Township Park Rangers
- Butler County Metro Parks
- Clark County Park District
- Clearfork Reservoir Police Department
- Cleveland Metroparks Police Department
- Columbus and Franklin County Metro Parks
- Erie MetroParks Police Department
- Five Rivers MetroParks
- Geauga County Park District Rangers
- Great Parks of Hamilton County
- Greene County Park District Ranger Unit
- Johnny Appleseed Metropolitan Park District
- Lake Metroparks Police Department
- Lima Parks Department
- Lorain County Metro Parks
- Medina County Park District
- Miami County Park District - Park Rangers
- Mill Creek Metro Parks Police Department
- Muskingum Watershed Conservatory District
- Portage Park District
- Preservation Parks of Delaware County
- Sandusky County Park District - Ranger Department
- Stark County Park District - Enforcement Division
- Summit Metro Parks
- Toledo Metropolitan Park District/Ranger Department
- Wood County Park District

== Other agencies ==
- CSX Railroad Police Department
- Cuyahoga Metropolitan Housing Authority Police Department
- Greater Cleveland Regional Transit Authority Police
- Greenlawn Cemetery Police
- METROTransit Police Department
- Norfolk Southern Railway Police Department
- Republic N&T Railway (Republic Steel) Police Department
- Toledo/Lucas County Port Authority Police Department
- University Circle Police Department
- Westfield OFIC Police

== Disbanded/defunct ==
- Addyston Police Department
- Arlington Heights Police Department
- Alger Police Department
- Amelia Police Department
- Attica Police Department
- Baltimore and Ohio Southwestern Railroad Police
- Belle Center Police Department
- Brady Lake Police Department
- Bremen Police Department
- Boston Mills Police Department
- Buckland Police Department
- Caldwell Police Department
- Cairo Police Department
- Canton Park Police
- Carthage Police Department
- Carthage National Distillers Police
- Cedar Point Police Department
- Chesapeake and Ohio Railroad Police
- Cincinnati General Hospital Police
- Cincinnati Merchants Police
- Cincinnati Park Board Police
- Cincinnati Private Police
- Cincinnati Special Police
- Cincinnati Union Terminal Police
- Cincinnati Water Works Police
- Cleveland Cincinnati Chicago and St. Louis Railroad Police
- Cleves Police Department
- Cloverdale Police Department
- Colerain Springfield Police
- College Corner Police Department
- Conrail Railroad Police
- Fairview Village Police Department
- Farmersville Police Department
- Fernald Security Police Department
- Fletcher Police Department
- Hamler Town Marshal's Office
- Hartwell Police Department
- Heights Merchants Police Department
- Holden Arboretum Police Department
- Holgate Police Department
- Hudson Township Police Department
- Hyde Park Marshal's Office
- Kings Island Police Department
- Knox Township Police Department
- Lakeview Police Department
- Lemon Township Police Department
- Lincoln Heights Police Department
- Lockington Police Department
- Lordstown Marshal's Office
- Madisonville Police Department
- Malinta Police Department
- Malvern Police Department
- Manchester Police Department
- McClure Police Department
- Moscow Police Department
- New Madison Police Department
- Newton Falls Police Department
- New Orleans and Texas Pacific Railroad Police
- New Riegel Police Department
- New Rome Police Department
- Newtonsville Police Department
- North Bend Police Department
- Northern Hills Rangers
- Oakley Police Department
- Ohio Board of State Charities Agents
- Ohio Department of Industrial Relations Inspectors
- Ohio Department of Liquor Control Enforcement Division
- Ohio Department of Mental Health Lewis Center Police
- Ohio Department of Mental Health Longview Police
- Ohio Department of Mental Health Rollman Psychiatric Institute Police
- Ohio State Fair Police
- Ohio State Protective Association
- Pennsylvania Railroad Police Department
- Quincy Police Department
- Randolph Fair Police Department
- Randolph Township Police Department
- Ravenna Township Police Department
- Richfield Township
- Rural Ohio Police
- Rushylvania Police Department
- StParis Police Department
- South Lebanon Police Department
- Stokes Township Police Department
- Sugar Bush Knolls Police Department
- Symmes Township Police Department
- Tax Commission of Ohio Enforcement
- Twinsburg Township Police Department
- Valley Hi Police Department
- West Mansfield Police Department
