= Shooting of Corey Phillips =

2025 shooting of an unarmed white man in Akron, Ohio

- Date: November 11, 2025
- Time: 9:14 p.m. ET
- Location: Akron, Ohio, United States

On November 11, 2025, a 36-year-old unarmed white man named Corey Phillips was shot eight times by an Akron Police officer, 22 seconds after arriving on a report of a man acting suspicious in the Ellet neighborhood of Akron, Ohio. Investigators confirmed that the shooting happened after Phillips was kicked out of a Ellet bar called “Karams".

The shooting prompted backlash from Phillips’ family, who asked why the officer didn't de-escalate the situation before firing his weapon. The officer who shot Phillips was placed on administrative leave following the incident.

== Incident ==
At 9:03 p.m. ET on November 11, Akron police officers respond to the intersection of Albrecht Avenue and High Grove Boulevard in the Ellet neighborhood after multiple 911 calls flooded through the dispatch center, saying that Phillips was "acting strange and suspicious". One caller told dispatch believed that Phillips was "walking down the parking lot, threatening people, armed with a black 9mm handgun and had attempted to shoot through a window". Officer Caleb Bodjanac became the first officer to arrive at scene, 11 minutes later at 9:14 p.m. ET. Despite witnesses saying that an intoxicated man was pointing a gun at people, Phillips was not armed with any weapon. Bodjanac turned on his bodycam and spotted Phillips unarmed, wearing black pants and a dark gray jacket, and walking on the sidewalk near the parking lot leading to Karam's Lounge at the 2700 block of Albrecht Avenue. Officer Bodjanac got out of his marked car, immediately drew his pistol, and shouted at him to get his hands out of his pockets and telling him to stop where he was. Phillips raised his hands up before the officer demanded him to get down to the ground or get shot.

Phillips refused to get down and began to rub his chest before Bodjanac opened fire on Phillips, shooting 15 rounds, and hitting him eight times, with two shots striking his chest, exactly 22 seconds after arriving at the scene. Phillips began to stumble as the bullets struck him before falling to the ground. Bodjanac walked to the parking lot next to a parked Mazda CX-9, still pointing the gun towards Phillips, and reloaded his weapon. As other Akron officers arrived on scene, Bodjanac continued to demand Phillips to "get his hand out of his pockets or he'll be shot again". Phillips began screaming before Bodjanac and his backup approached him. Phillips told Bodjanac that he never had a gun, as the officers placed him in handcuffs. Phillips began screaming as officers moved his arms before being handcuffed. Officers then remove his shirt, revealing multiple gunshot wounds. Shortly before being treated by the Akron Fire Department, Phillips shouted "I Can't Breathe" six times before being taken by fire to a nearby hospital in both critical condition and intensive care.

== Caleb Bodjanac ==
Caleb Bodjanac, the officer who shot Phillips, was placed on administrative leave following the shooting. Bodjanac, a Stow, Ohio native and a former marine from Marine Corps Recruit Depot Parris Island, had been with the Akron Police Department for a single year after being part of the Canton Police Department three-and-a-half years prior, with the exception of a short time in May 2022 when he briefly joined the U.S. Customs and Border Protection. An article released by Signal Akron confirms that Bodjanac had been involved in 22 use-of-force incidents, with a total of 8 incidents in Canton, and 14 incidents in Akron. During his duty in Canton, he received certification as a Crisis Intervention Team (CIT) officer, a detail he later cited in a rebuttal to a disciplinary reprimand he received in Akron.

Bodjanac had been previously involved in three use-of-force incidents that sparked controversy since joining the Akron Police Department in December 2024. One of which involves Bodjanac having been previously involved in a controversial incident involving another man, alongside officer Dylan Carmany in February 2025. In the report, both officers observed an individual yelling and flailing his arms while walking in traffic. They approached the male individual, who is not named in the report, before being physically engaged to prevent his departure by taking him down and punching him in the face. Anthony Finnell, who reviews use-of-force incidents and offers policy recommendations, discussed that the teen did not have a weapon, and had marijuana instead which is a low-level offense. He spoke that "there was no imminent threat, he didn’t have a weapon, and there was no serious crime that had been committed that would justify that serious level of force", during his five reviews at the Citizens’ Police Oversight Board that June.

== Aftermath ==
On December 4, a GoFundMe page was posted by his mother, saying that Phillips, who has six children, had extensive surgery on his liver, intestines and arms. His elbow is "completely destroyed", and he has no feeling in both of his hands due to severe nerve damage.

Shammas Malik, the mayor of Akron, replied in a statement a few days after the shooting, confirming that "he was not armed nor carrying a gun", adding "I recognize how difficult and confusing this could be for many in our community, and I feel the weight of those concerns". During the statement, Malik replied that he was already carrying out a “comprehensive review” of the department's use-of-force policies. Malik responded to reporters that "they can’t control every factor in volatile, high-risk situations, but can control on how they prepare, train, and act".

== Investigation ==
The Ohio Bureau of Criminal Investigation took over investigation afterward, saying that despite having serious injuries, they described his injuries as "non-life threatening". The National Fraternal Order of Police Lodge #7, a union that represents officers in Akron, replied in a statement that officers “encountered an uncooperative individual and were forced to make a split-second decision to ensure their own safety and that of the community.” The union referred to “initial reports from citizens” that said the man was armed, though the gun was never officially recovered.
