= Ohio Collaborative =

The Ohio Collaborative is a twelve-person panel in Ohio that establishes statewide standards for law enforcement agencies. The result of recommendations from a task force created by Ohio Governor John Kasich, the Ohio Collaborative is co-chaired by Director of Public Safety John Born and former Ohio Senator Nina Turner. Other members of the collaborative include representatives from law enforcement, community members, and legislators.

The Ohio Collaborative's initial recommendations were on guidelines for use of force and employee recruitment. The panel has since published standards on bias free policing, body worn cameras, community engagement, and telecommunicator training.

The recommendations put forth by the Ohio Collaborative are not compulsory. Agencies that choose to comply with the guidelines are considered to be "certified" by the Collaborative, are issued certificates, and are listed on the Ohio Collaborative website.

== Panel members ==
There are 12 members on the Ohio Collaborative:

- John Born, Ohio Director of Public Safety, Co-Chiar
- Nina Turner, former Ohio Senator, Co-Chair
- Brian Armstead, Sergeant, Akron Police Department
- Lori Barreras, Ohio Civil Rights Commission
- Ronnie Dunn, Associate Professor, Cleveland State University
- Austin B. Harris, Student, Central State University
- Michael H. Keenan, City Councilman, Dublin, Ohio
- Damon Lynch III, Senior Pastor
- Rob Streck, Sheriff, Montgomery County
- Michael J. Navarre, Chief of Police, Oregon PD
- Ronald J. O’Brien, Franklin County Prosecutor

== Certified agencies ==
Of 831 law enforcement agencies in Ohio, 329 are certified by the Ohio Collaborative:

- Ada Police Department
- Akron Police Department
- Allen County Sheriff's Office
- Amelia Police Department
- Amherst Police Department
- American Township Police Department
- Andover Police Department
- Ansonia Police Department
- Ashland County Sheriff's Office
- Ashland Police Department
- Athens City Police Department
- Athens County Sheriff's Office
- Auglaize County Sheriff's Office
- Aurora Police Department
- Austintown Police Department
- Avon Lake Police Department
- Avon Police Department
- Barberton Police Department
- Bath Township Police Department
- Bay View Police Department
- Bazetta Township Police Department
- Beachwood Police Department
- Beavercreek Police Department
- Beaver Police Department
- Bellbrook Police Department
- Bellefontaine Police Department
- Bellevue Police Department
- Belmont County Sheriff's Office
- Bethel Police Department
- Bexley Police Department
- Blue Ash Police Department
- Boston Heights Police Department
- Bowling Green Police Department
- Bowling Green State University Police Department
- Brimfield Police Department
- Broadview Heights Police Department
- Brookville Police Department
- Brown County Sheriff's Office
- Brunswick Division of Police
- Bucyrus Police Department
- Butler County Sheriff's Office
- Butler Township Police Department
- Cambridge Police Department
- Canal Fulton Police Department
- Canfield Police Department
- Canton Police Department
- Carroll County Sheriff's Office
- Carroll Township Police Department
- Centerville Police Department
- Chagrin Falls Police Department
- Champaign County Sheriff's Office
- Cincinnati State Technical and Community College
- Cincinnati Police Department
- Circleville Police Department
- Clark County Sheriff's Office
- Clayton Police Department
- Clay Township Police Department
- Clearcreek Township Police Department
- Clermont County Sheriff's Office
- Cleveland Heights Police Department
- Cleveland Metroparks Ranger Department
- Cleveland State University Police Department
- Clinton County Sheriff's Office
- Coldwater Police Department
- Colerain Police Department
- Columbiana County Sheriff's Office
- Columbus Airport Police Department
- Columbus Police Department
- Columbus State Community College Police Department
- Copley Township Police Department
- Covington Police Department
- Cuyahoga Falls Police Department
- Cuyahoga Heights Police Department
- Cuyahoga Metropolitan Housing Authority Police Department
- Danbury Police Department
- Darke County Sheriff's Office
- Dayton International Airport Police Division
- Dayton Police Department
- Defiance County Sheriff's Office
- Delaware County Sheriff's Office
- Delhi Police Department
- East Cleveland Police Department
- Eastlake Police Department
- Eaton Police Department
- Elida Police Department
- Elmore Police Department
- Elyria Police Department
- Erie County Sheriff's Office
- Euclid Police Department
- Evendale Police Department
- Fairborn Police Department
- Fairfield Police Department
- Fairlawn Police Department
- Fayette County Sheriff's Office
- Findlay Police Department
- Forest Park Police Department
- Fostoria Police Department
- Franklin County Metro Parks
- Fredericktown Police Department
- Fremont Police Department
- Fulton County Sheriff's Office
- Gahanna Police Department
- Garfield Heights Police Department
- Gates Mills Police Department
- Geauga County Sheriff's Office
- Genoa Police Department
- Genoa Township Police Department
- German Township Police Department
- Gnadenhutten Police Department
- Goshen Township Police Department
- Grafton Police Department
- Grandview Medical Center Police Department
- Granville Police Department
- Great Parks of Hamilton County Ranger Department
- Greene County Sheriff's Office
- Green Hills Police Department
- Green Township Police Department
- Greenville Police Department
- Guernsey County Sheriff's Office
- Hamilton Police Department
- Hardin County Sheriff's Office
- Harrison County Sheriff's Office
- Harrison Police Department
- Hebron Police Department
- Highland County Sheriff's Office
- Highland Heights Police Department
- Hills & Dales Police Department
- Hocking College Police Department
- Hocking County Sheriff's Office
- Holmes County Sheriff's Office
- Howland Township Police Department
- Hubbard Police Department
- Hubbard Township Police Department
- Huber Heights Police Department
- Hudson Police Department
- Hunting Valley Police Department
- Huron County Sheriff's Office
- Indian Hill Rangers
- Jackson Police Department
- Jackson Township Police Department (Montgomery County)
- Jackson Township Police Department (Stark County)
- Johnstown Police Department
- Kent State University Police Department
- Kettering Police Department
- Kirtland Hills Police Department
- Knox County Sheriff's Office
- Lakewood Police Department
- Lake County Sheriff's Office
- Lakeland College Police Department
- Lancaster Police Department
- Lebanon Police Department
- Lexington Police Department
- Liberty Township Police Department (Trumbull County)
- Licking County Sheriff's Office
- Lockland Police Department
- Logan County Sheriff's Office
- Logan Police Department
- London Police Department
- Lorain County Sheriff's Office
- Lorain Police Department
- Louisville Police Department
- Loveland Police Department
- Madison Township Police Department
- Mahoning County Sheriff's Office
- Mansfield Police Department
- Mariemont Police Department
- Marietta Police Department
- Marion County Sheriff's Office
- Marion Township Police Department
- Marysville Police Department
- Massillon Police Department
- Maumee Police Department
- Mayfield Heights Police Department
- McDonald Police Department
- Mechanicsburg Police Department
- Medina County Sheriff's Office
- Medina Police Department
- Medina Township Police Department
- Medway Drug Enforcement Agency (Wayne County)
- Mentor-on-the-Lake Police Department
- Miami County Park District
- Miamisburg Police Department
- Mercer County Sheriff's Office
- Miami Township Police Department
- Miami University Police Department
- Middleburg Heights Police Department
- Milan Police Department
- Milford Police Department
- Mill Creek Metro Parks Police Department
- Millersburg Police Department
- Minerva Park Police Department
- Mogadore Police Department
- Montgomery County Sheriff's Office
- Montgomery Police Department
- Montipelier Police Department
- Montville Township Police Department
- Morrow County Sheriff's Office
- Mount Healthy Police Department
- Muskingum County Sheriff's Office
- Napoleon Police Department
- Newark Division of Police
- New Bremen Police Department
- Newburgh Police Department
- New Knoxville Police Department
- New Franklin Police Department
- New Lexington Police Department
- New London Police Department
- New Middletown Police Department
- Newtown Police Department
- Newtonsville Police Department
- Niles Police Department
- North Canton Police Department
- Northeast Ohio Medical University Police Department
- North Olmstead Police Department
- North Ridgeville Police Department
- Northwood Police Department
- Norton Police Department
- Norwood Police Department
- Notre Dame College Police Department
- Oak Harbor Police Department
- Oakwood Public Safety Department
- Ohio University Police Department
- Ohio State University Police Department
- Ohio Veterans Homes Police Department
- Olmsted Township Police Department
- Ontario Police Department
- Oregon Police Department
- Ottawa County Sheriff's Office
- Ottawa Hills Police Department
- Otterbein Police Department
- Owens State Community College Police Department
- Oxford Division of Police
- Oxford Township Police Department
- Painesville Police Department
- Parma Heights Police Department
- Pepper Pike Police Department
- Perkins Township Police Department
- Perry Police Department
- Perry Township Police Department
- Pierce Township Police Department
- Pickaway County Sheriff's Office
- Piqua Police Department
- Plain City Police Department
- Port Clinton Police Department
- Powell Police Department
- Preble County Sheriff's Office
- Putnam County Sheriff's Office
- Reading Police Department
- Richland County Sheriff's Office
- Richmond Heights Police Department
- Rittman Police Department (Medina County)
- Rittman Police Department (Wayne County)
- Rocky River Police Department
- Russells Point Police Department
- Sagamore Hills Police Department
- Salem Township Police Department
- Sandusky Police Department
- Seven Hills Police Department
- Shaker Heights Police Department
- Sharon Township Police Department
- Sharonville Police Department
- Shawnee Hills Police Department
- Shawnee State University Department of Public Safety
- Shawnee Township Police Department
- Sheffield Village Police Department
- Shelby Police Department
- Sidney Police Department
- Sinclair Community College Police Department
- Solon Police Department
- Somerset Police Department
- Springboro Police Department
- Springdale Police Department
- Springfield Police Division
- Springfield Township Police Department
- Stow Police Department
- Stark County Sheriff's Office
- Streetsboro Police Department
- Strongsville Police Department
- Sugarcreek Police Department
- Summa Health System Protective Services
- Summit County Sheriff's Office
- Sidney Parks Department
- Tallmadge Police Department
- Terrace Park Police Department
- Tiffin Police Department
- Tipp City Police Department
- Toledo Police Department
- Trotwood Police Department
- Troy Police Department
- Twinsburg Police Department
- Union County Sheriff's Office
- Uniontown Police Department
- University Circle Police Department
- University of Akron Police Department
- University of Cincinnati Department of Public Safety
- University of Rio Grande Police Department
- University of Toledo Police Department
- Upper Arlington Police Department
- Vandalia Police Department
- Van Wert County Sheriff's Office
- Vermillion Police Department
- Village of Addyston Police Department
- Village of Owensville Police Department
- Village of St. Bernard Police Department
- Wadsworth Police Department
- Waite Hill Police Department
- Walton Hills Police Department
- Warren County Sheriff's Office
- Warren Township Police Department
- Washington County Sheriff's Office
- Waterville Township Police Department
- Wauseon Police Department
- Wayne Police Department
- Waynesfield Police Department
- Weathersfield Township Police Department
- West Carrollton Police Department
- West Chester Police Department
- West Lafayette Police Department
- Westerville Police Department
- Westlake Police Department
- West Liberty Police Department
- Whitehall Police Department
- Whitehouse Police Department
- Wickliffe Police Department
- Williamsburg Police Department
- Wilmington Police Department
- Willoughby Hills Police Department
- Willoughby Police Department
- Willowick Police Department
- Wood County Sheriff's Office
- Woodlawn Police Division
- Wooster Police Department
- Worthington Police Department
- Wyoming Police Department
- Xenia Police Department
- Zanesville Police Department
