= California Act to Save Lives =

California State Legislature
- Long title: An act to amend the standard for police use of deadly force in California
- Citation: AB-392
- Territorial extent: State of California
- Enacted by: California State Assembly
- Enacted: August 19, 2019
- Signed by: Gavin Newsom
- Signed: August 19, 2019
- Introduced by: Shirley Weber

Summary
- Narrows the circumstances under which police officers may use deadly force, requiring it to be "necessary" rather than merely "reasonable."
- Status: In force

California Assembly Bill 392, officially the California Act to Save Lives and often dubbed the Stephon Clark law, is a California statute, signed August 19, 2019, which reforms California's standard on police use of force. The bill was introduced to the California State Assembly by Assemblymember Shirley Weber in response to the shooting of Stephon Clark and the subsequent decision by the Sacramento County district attorney to treat Clark's death as legally-justifiable. It is the first reform to the state's use of force standard since the standard was first promulgated in 1872.

AB392 changed the prerequisite for deadly force from when it is considered "reasonable" to when it is “necessary to defend against an imminent threat of death or serious bodily injury to the officer or to another person.” In addition, it combined the need for "when necessary" with a requirements courts consider an officer’s conduct leading up to a use of deadly force when determining whether the officer’s actions were justified.

Madison Pauly, writing in Mother Jones, states that Lexipol founder Bruce Praet alluded to working with members of the California legislature on the wording of the statute, and quotes Praet as saying "We—law enforcement—got 95 percent of what we needed out of [the bill]."

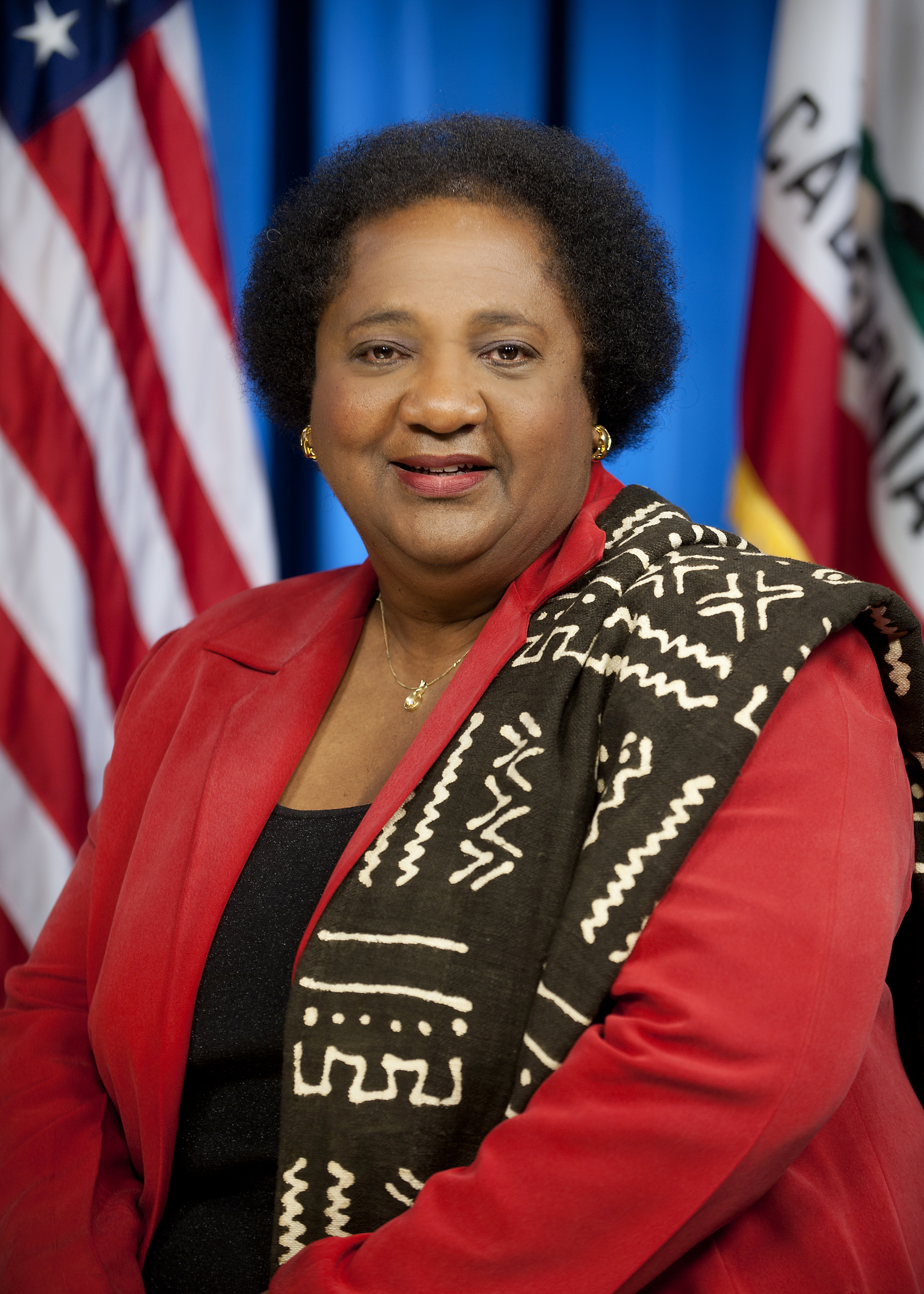
Shirley Weber, California State Assembly (2012)
