= Akron Police Department =

Police department of Akron, Ohio

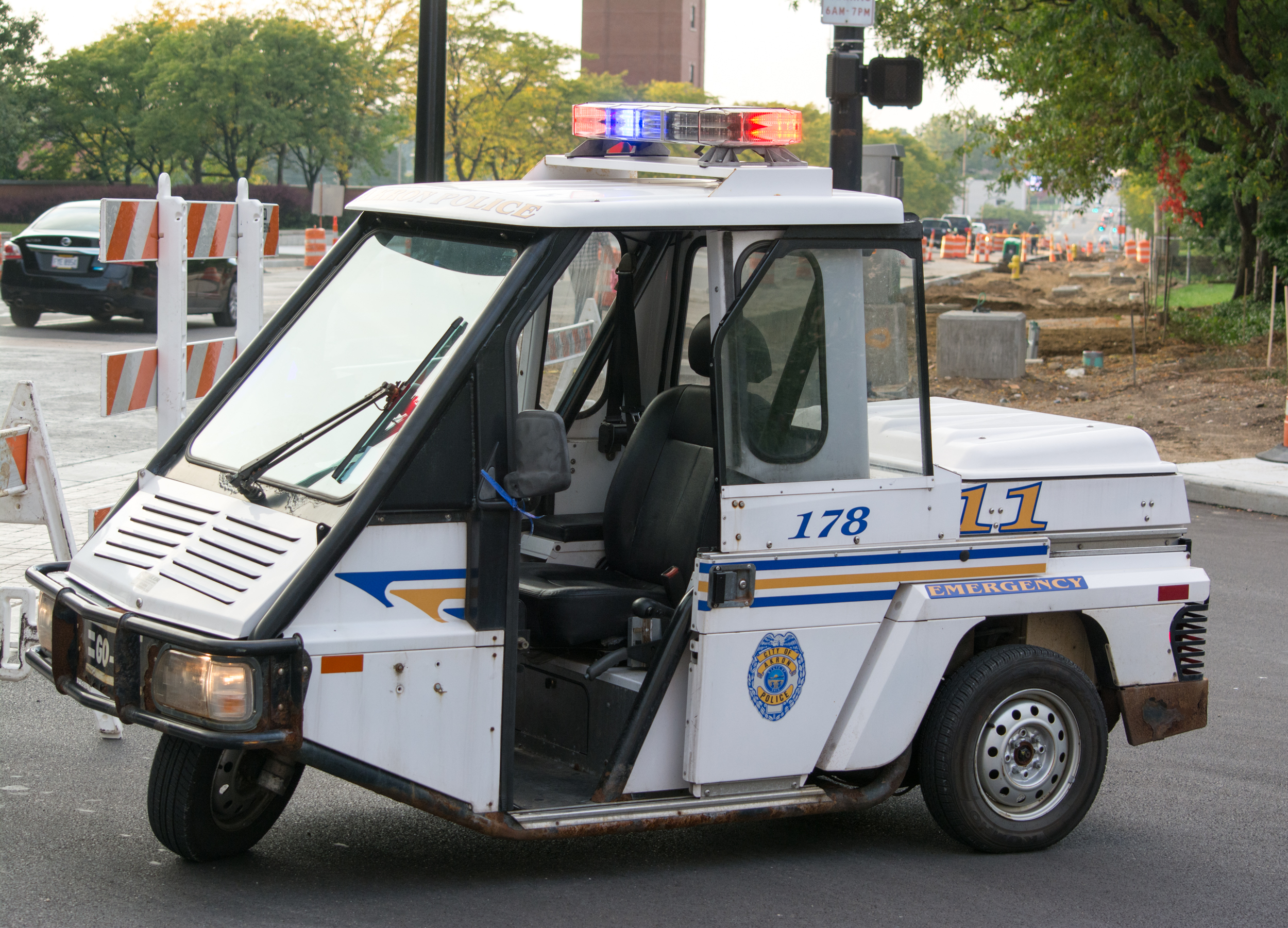
Three wheeler as a police vehicle in Akron

Akron Police Department is the primary municipal law enforcement agency for the city of Akron, Ohio, United States with 451 employees. The current Police Chief is Brian Harding.

== History ==
=== Early years ===
The city of Akron was founded in December 1825, where the south part of the downtown Akron neighborhood sits today. The earliest artifact present in the Akron Police Department Museum is a key to the Akron Police Jail from 1890.

The Akron police department was the first police department ever to use a horseless, motorized police vehicle. It was powered by two 4-hp electric motors, could reach a maximum speed of 18 mph, and travel 30 miles before its battery had to be recharged. It was manufactured in 1899 by the Collins Buggy Company, designed by city mechanical engineer Frank Loomis, and operated by officer Louis Mueller Sr. The car was a paddy wagon which weighed 5000 pounds and cost $2,400 (about $90,500 in 2024). It had a seating space of 12 people and was equipped with electric headlights, a gong and a cell for prisoners. Its first assignment was to pick up an intoxicated man at Main and Exchange streets. During the riot of 1900 it was damaged and thrown into the Ohio and Erie Canal by rioters who exchanged fire with police officers who then fled the police headquarters to escape from the burning building. It was rescued the next day and remained in service until 1905 before being sold for $25.

== Organization and structure ==
The Akron Police Department is made up of 3 divisions-the Uniformed subdivision, the Investigative Subdivision and the Services Subdivision. These subdivisions may be further divided into bureaus and specialized units. The uniformed subdivision performs most of the regular police work done by the department. The personnel working in the investigative subdivision are responsible for all the investigative work performed by the department. The personnel serving in the services subdivision perform a variety of administrative and technical tasks related to the maintenance and functioning of the department.

=== Uniform subdivision ===
It is the largest subdivision inside the Akron PD. It is further divided into the Patrol Bureau and the Traffic Bureau.The primary function of the patrol bureau is to respond to calls for service and patrol the neighborhoods of Akron to ensure public order. The Patrol Bureau consists of five patrol platoons in addition to many other specialized units for accomplishing certain specific tasks. The specialized units maintained by the patrol bureau include:

- Patrol Operations: The Patrol Operations group of the Bureau commands all of the day-to-day patrol work performed by the patrol bureau. It is the control center of the 4 regular patrol platoons of the patrol bureau as well as all the specialized units attached to the bureau.
- Police Information Desk: The information desk assists the people who come to the police station for various reasons, including filing a non-emergency police report or a complaint. It also keeps a record of all the vehicles towed inside the city.
- K-9 Unit: The K-9 teams of the Akron Police Department are not organized inside a separate unit but are assigned to the 4 regular patrol platoons during all the patrol shifts and step in when required. The department currently maintains six K9 patrol teams and two K9 narcotics' teams which consist of one sergeant, 5 officers and 6 police dogs. Like all other canine units in the world, it performs crime scene searches as well as detection of people and items. Officers in this unit are also members of the patrol platoons at the same time.
- Special Weapons and Tactics (SWAT): Like all other police SWAT teams and similar police tactical units in the U.S. and the rest of the world, the SWAT officers of APD are often involved in operations such as responding to extreme emergencies, confrontations with armed preparators, raids and dignitary protection.
- Court/Building Security: Established in 1981 as the Court Liaison Detail to provide court security, this unit provides security for all six municipal courts in Akron and has also been providing security to the Harold K. Stubbs Justice Center since 1996.
- Motorcycle Unit: The motorcycle officers of the department are assigned to this unit and are involved in traffic patrol, dignitary escort and representing the department at ceremonial events.
- Police Community Relations: This group consists of officers who are responsible for planning and coordinating the community work performed by the department.
- Police Honor Guard: The officers who volunteer to serve in this part-time ceremonial guard represent Akron Police at functions, parades, funerals and other related ceremonies. Officers inside this unit also serve in other full-time units and are called upon to serve as a part of the honor guard only in times of need.
- Community Engagement Team: The CET is the Police group responsible for nurturing the department's relationship with the communities of Akron. They frequently attend community programs and events and respond to non-emergency neighborhood issues.

The Traffic Bureau enforces traffic laws, is in charge of traffic management for special events and is also involved in traffic patrol. They are often the first responders to vehicular accidents. The Bureau's other specialized function include Hit Skip, Commercial Vehicle Weight Enforcement, and Traffic Crash Reconstruction. The traffic crash reconstruction unit investigates fatal or serious accidents and felonies and analyses crashes, evaluates equipment requisitions, and assists in criminal investigations where motor vehicles are involved.

=== Investigative subdivision ===
The investigative subdivision of APD is commanded by the deputy chief of police. It investigates crimes, apprehends offenders, processes crime scenes, recovers stolen property and prepares cases for trial. The specialist units that come inside the investigative subdivision are:

- Crimes Against Persons/Major Crimes: As the name suggests, the Major Crimes Unit (MCU) investigates homicides, felonious assaults, robberies, sexual assaults and other major felonies. The officers working in this group are on duty during 2 shifts between 3pm and 7am. All major crimes reported during these shifts are investigated by this unit.
- Sexual Assault Kit Initiative (SAKI): The SAKI investigates cold case sexual assaults with the help of forensic and DNA evidence. It is funded entirely by grants and collaborates with the Summit County Prosecutors Office, Ohio BCI, Victim Assistance Program, and the Rape Crisis Center.
- Crimes against property: The Crimes against Property Unit (CPU) investigates thefts, financial crimes and burglaries.
- Juvenile, Auto Theft and Missing persons:The Juvenile branch investigates cases where the victims or suspects are under the age of 18, such as child sexual abuse and major crimes committed by minors. As a multipurpose unit, it also investigates grand theft auto and missing person cases
- Crime Scene: The function of the Crime Scene branch is to analyze the area where an alleged crime reportedly occurred; collecting physical and trace evidence, examining crime scenes and securing them all come under the domain of this group. It also maintains criminal histories and analyzes confiscated narcotics.
- Polygraph Unit: As its name suggests, much of its work is related to polygraphs. It conducts polygraph tests on both, people being interviewed for investigative purposes and polygraph tests conducted on potential future employees of the department
- Narcotics / Street Narcotics Uniform Detail (SNUDS) / Vice:SNUDS is a specialist branch of Akron Police Department commanded by an officer with the tank of Captain. Its focus is on crimes related to drugs. Additionally, it also investigates illegal activities related to liquor, gambling, pornography, human trafficking and prostitution.

=== Services Subdivision ===
The services subdivision performs inter departmental functions required for the maintenance of the Akron Police Department. It consists of the Administrative Services Bureau and The Technical Services Bureau.

==== Administrative Services Bureau ====
The Administrative Services Bureau primarily handles the overall financial administration of the department. It is further divided into the units Training, Planning and Research, Civil Liabilities, and Equipment Control.

The Training Bureau conducts annual training for police officers and reserves, and operates the Akron Police Department Police Academy.

The Planning and Research branch handles federal and state grants allotted to the department as well as other Special Revenue Funds which total in excess of $5,700,000. It manages the departments partnerships with the Caring Communities, East Akron Community House, Children's Services and the University of Akron.

==== Technical Services Bureau ====
The technical services bureau consists of the following units:

- Information Systems: The Information Systems branch handles matters related to the day-to-day functioning of the computers used by the department. It is commanded by Deputy Chief of Police Michael Caprez.
- Intelligence Unit: The intelligence unit is commanded by a police officer with the rank of sergeant and composed of four crime analysts and one detective.
- Record Room

== Rank structure and insignia ==
Title	Insignia
Chief of Police	
Major	
Captain	
Lieutenant	
Sergeant	
Police Officer/Police Detective	

== Controversies ==
● Killing of Jayland Walker
● Shooting of Corey Phillips

== See also ==
- List of law enforcement agencies in Ohio
