= Crime in Akron, Ohio =

There have been notable instances of crime in the American city of Akron, Ohio. A rioting mob in 1900 destroyed several public buildings in their attempts to gain access to the suspect in a child sex attack. In the early 20th century a Black Hand gang led by Rosario Borgio ran an extortion racket; attempts by the police to suppress these activities led to the killing of several policemen and the execution of Borgio. Race riots broke out in 1968 when police were confronted by the inhabitants of the Wooster Avenue area.

== First police patrol wagon ==
Frank Fowler Loomis designed and built the world's first motorized paddy wagon. The electric wagon made its appearance on the streets of Akron in 1899.

== Riot of 1900 ==
On August 22, 1900, Akron experienced the worst riot in the town's history, and possibly the worst riot in Ohio history. This followed the abduction and sexual assault on the six-year-old daughter of the Maas family while in front of her home. Around midnight that day, Louis Peck, an African-American who had been working as a bartender on Howard Street in Akron, was arrested at a train station in Cleveland but then brought back to Akron where he confessed to the crime. The next day's newspapers exaggerated Peck's confession and even printed the confession in red ink. A mob gathered in front of the newly built City Building and threatened a lynching. The Police Chief arranged for Peck and another black man to be moved to Cleveland for their safety. In the evening crowds grew larger and demanded Peck. They attempted to enter the City Building, but were barred by police. Tensions escalated - shots were fired at the police, and the police fired into the crowd. The crossfire killed two small children. The mob then obtained and used dynamite, blowing up the City Building and the Courthouse in attempts to gain access to where they thought Peck was. Rioters even attacked firemen who attempted to put the fire out, by throwing bricks and cutting their hoses. The rioters burned the downtown fire station to the ground. During the riot, the mayor addressed the crowd from the window of a building, telling the crowd that Peck had been taken from Akron to Cleveland, but the crowd did not believe him. The mob violence lasted nearly to 4:00 the next morning, when the Governor declared martial law and sent soldiers to restore order. Thirty-one men and boys were later convicted of charges related to the riot. Louis Peck was convicted in less than 20 minutes and sentenced to prison term. No lawyer would take his case. In 1913 Governor Cox freed him due to wrongful imprisonment.

== Extortion racket ==
Akron was one of the first Mafia cities in the 20th century Midwest. The Black Hand, led by Don Rosario Borgio, who arrived in Akron in the early 1900s, was headquartered on the city's north side. Using a general goods store as a front, Borgio set up two back rooms for illegal operations. All of the gambling and brothels in the city were subjected to extortion, along with wealthy citizens of the Italian North Hill neighborhood. In 1918 the Akron Police Department started aggressively raiding Borgio's gambling and prostitution houses, locking up the operators and patrons. Due to the interference, Borgio held a meeting in his store with Black Hand leaders, giving the order to slay all the police in the city, offering a $250 reward for each one killed. The order led to the murders of Officers Guy Norris, Edward Costigan, Joe Hunt, and Gethin Richards. Following the case filed against him by New York Detective Fiaschetti over the slayings, Borgio was executed in the electric chair. After the execution Mafia activity in Akron greatly decreased.

== Wooster Avenue riots of 1968 ==
In July 1968, several riots occurred over the span of several days centered in the city's mostly black populated Wooster Avenue/Edgewood Avenue area. Relations between citizens and the Akron Police Department (APD) were already poor when on July 16, APD officers were called to quell fights in the area between black gangs from the city's north and west sides. Although initially quelled, the gang members continued a running fight with one another and the APD well into the morning. The police department reinforced their patrols in the area and imposed a curfew. The next day many residents of the area gathered on Wooster Avenue, having heard rumors of excessive violence on the part of the APD. The black citizens began berating and challenging the APD officers. With the first arrests of some of the citizens, the level of confrontation and hostilities rose until a full-scale riot was in progress. Most local citizens retreated to their homes or left the area altogether.

The riot spread to downtown Akron, and later that evening the National Guard was mobilized. On the morning of the 18th, Captain Al Monzo and his officers used tear gas in the area, and this ended the riot, although it was not officially regarded as over until the 23rd. The National Guard helped APD clean up the area and ensured that it remained under control. While occupying Akron the guardsmen camped inside the Rubber Bowl stadium. The Mayor of Akron, John S. Ballard, quickly called for an independent investigative commission to detail the events of the riot, and to investigate the root causes of it, and such a commission was appointed on the 26th.

== See also ==
- List of incidents of civil unrest in the United States
