= Mansfield Division of Police (Ohio) =

Law enforcement agency of Mansfield, Ohio, United States

- Abbreviation: MDP

Agency overview
- Formed: 19th century

Jurisdictional structure
- Operations jurisdiction: Mansfield, Ohio, US
- Area: 30.89 sq mi (80.01 km²)
- Population: 47,534 (2020)
- Legal jurisdiction: City of Mansfield
- Governing body: Mansfield City Council
- General nature: Local civilian police

Operational structure
- Headquarters: 30 North Diamond Street; Mansfield, Ohio, US
- Officers: 102 (2024)
- Mayor of Mansfield responsible: Jodie Perry
- Agency executives: Jason Bammann, Police Chief; Michael Napier, Assistant Chief
- Parent agency: Mansfield Department of Public Safety

Website
- Division of Police

The Mansfield Division of Police (MDP) is the governmental agency responsible for law enforcement in the city of Mansfield, Ohio.

== Description ==
On March 18, 2022, Jason Bammann became the city's police chief.

== Rank structure and insignia ==
Title	Insignia
Police Chief	
Police Captain	
Police Lieutenant	
Police Sergeant	
Field Training Officer; Police Officer; Police Detective	

== Fallen members ==
Since the establishment of the Mansfield Division of Police, four officers have been killed in the line of duty or other reasons.

Rank	Officer	Date of death	Details
Patrolman	John Englehart, Jr.	August 7, 1893	Struck by train
Lieutenant	William J. Taylor	February 26, 1949	Gunfire
Patrolman	Michael Raymond Hutchison	February 6, 1976	Gunfire
Police Officer	Brian Evans	December 26, 2007	Gunfire

== See also ==
- List of law enforcement agencies in Ohio
