= Police van =

Type of police vehicle

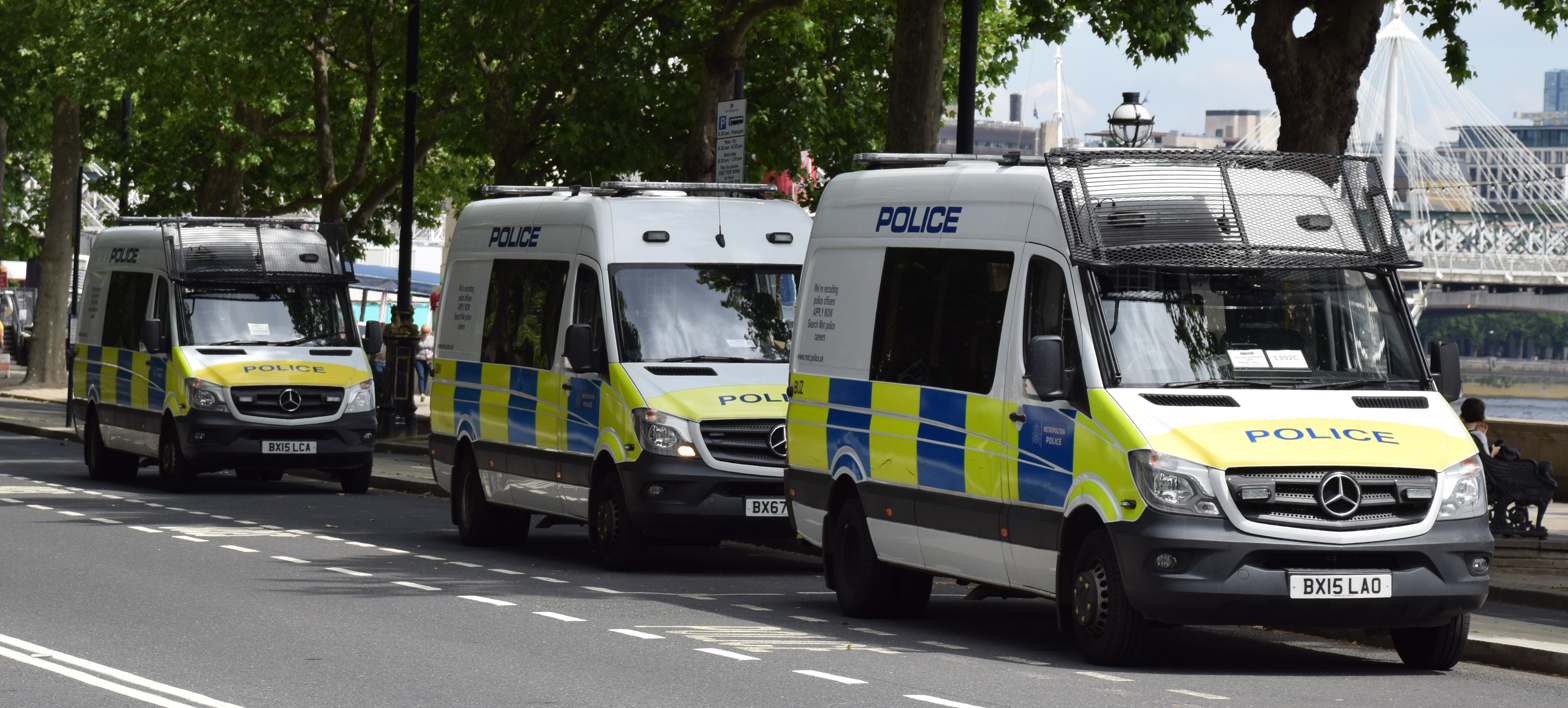
Mercedes-Benz Sprinter police vans used by the Metropolitan Police

A police van is a van operated by police. A police van might also be known as a paddy wagon, divisional van, patrol van, patrol wagon, police wagon, Black Mariah/Maria, police carrier, pie wagon (in old-fashioned usage), or squadrol (a unique term used by the Chicago Police Department). Police vans are usually employed for the transport of prisoners inside a specially adapted cell in the vehicle, the rapid transport of a number of officers to an incident, or to carry and move equipment.

== History ==
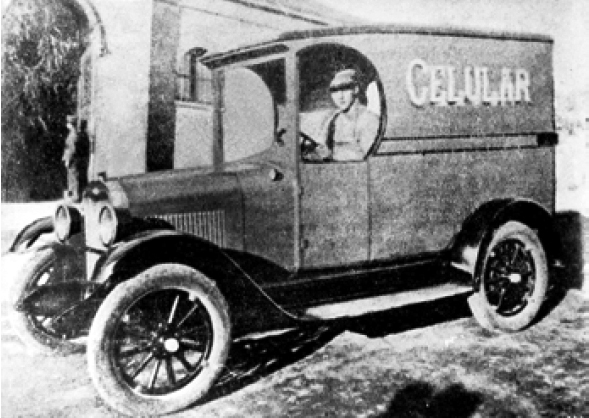
A "cell car" purchased by Antofagasta for the Chilean Gendarmerie in the 1920s

The precursor to police vans were police horse-drawn carriages, with the carriage serving as a secure mobile holding cell to transport arrested suspects. The American inventor Frank Fowler Loomis designed the first motorized patrol wagon out of a panel truck for the Akron Police Department in 1899. These trucks became known as "pie wagons" due to their fancied resemblance to delivery vans used by bakeries.

Early police vans were usually crudely adapted for accommodation of prisoners. The need for a secure police van was realized when prisoners who were resisting arrest needed to be transported. The concern was that if transported in a conventional patrol car, the prisoner might attack the officers during the journey. To combat this, police vans were designed with a fixed steel cage in the rear of the vehicle, effectively separating the prisoner from the officers.

== Etymology ==
Police vans have had a large number of names, mostly historical. They have been variously known as a paddy wagon, divisional van, patrol van, patrol wagon, police wagon, Black Mariah/Maria, police carrier, pie wagon, or squadrol (for the Chicago Police Department).

=== Paddy wagon ===
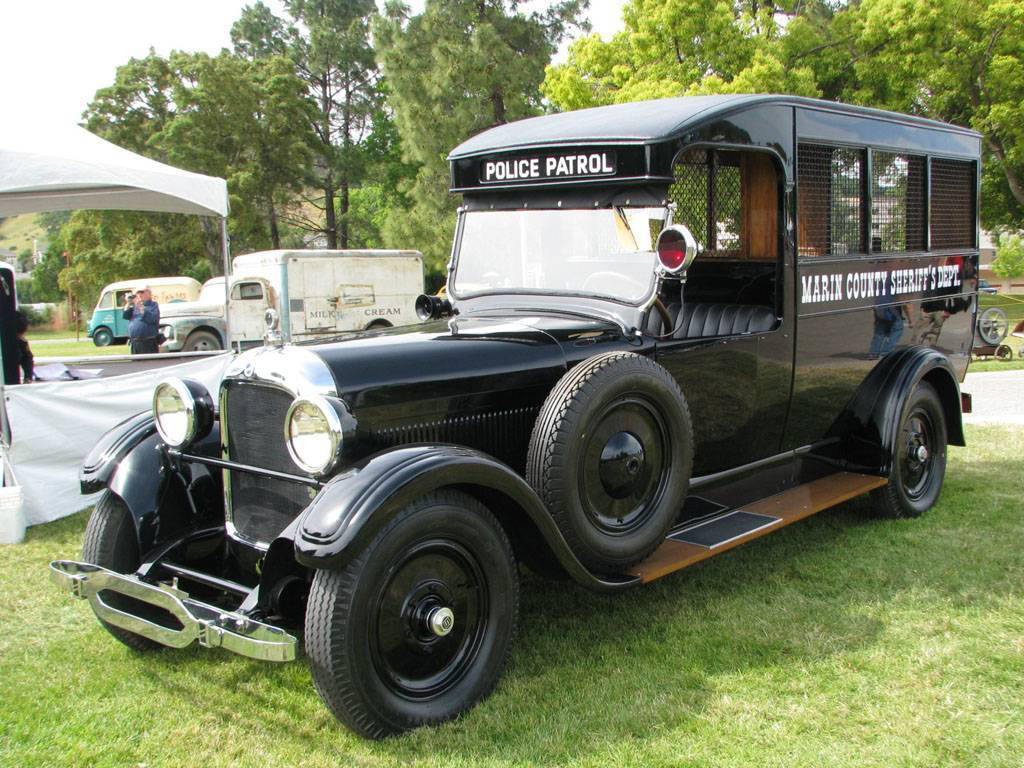
1925 Studebaker patrol wagon with Marin County Sheriff's Office markings

The precise origin of the term is uncertain and disputed, though its use dates back to the 1800s.

One theory holds that "paddy wagon" was simply a shortening of "patrol wagon", in the same way police cars are called patrol cars today.

"Paddy" is a common Irish shortening of Padraig (Patrick in English), and is also used as an ethnic slur to refer to Irish people. Irishmen were often police officers or detainees or both.

=== Black Maria ===
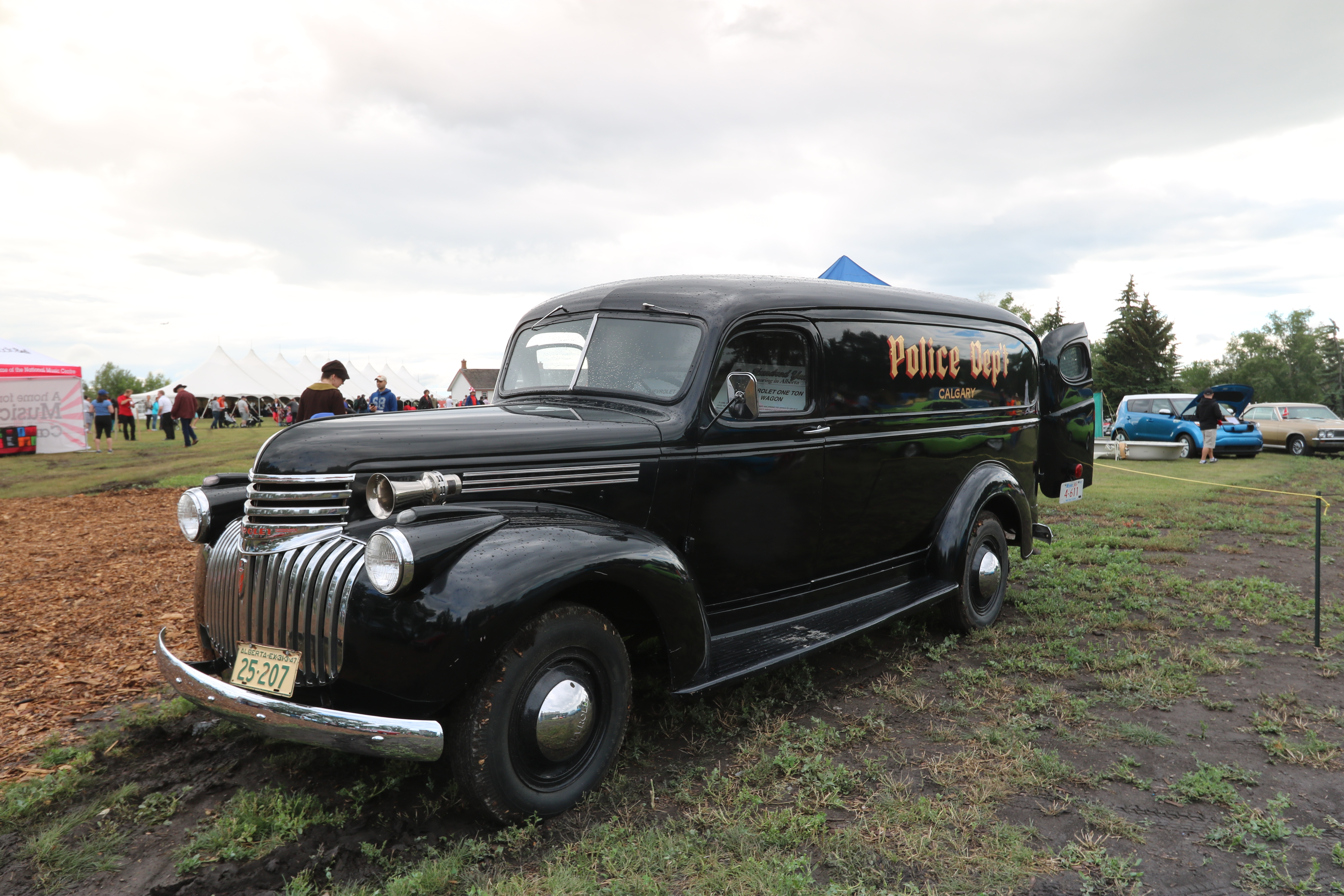
Chevrolet AK Series police van with Calgary Police Service markings; note the black coloring

In much of the Western world, early police wagons were usually painted black or a very dark color (usually dark blue), earning them the nickname of "Black Maria" (/məˈraɪə/ mə-RY-ə). The origin of this term is uncertain. The name Black Maria is common for racehorses, such as Black Maria of the 1920s, beginning with an 1832 appearance in Niles Weekly Register (October 10) and then again in Colburn's New Monthly Magazine and Humorist (1841). The OED lists the first usage in 1835. An example from Philadelphia was published in 1852. Brewer's Dictionary of Phrase and Fable suggests the name came from Maria Lee, a large and fearsome black keeper of a sailors' boarding house whom the police would call on for help with difficult prisoners. The English translation of the French detective novel Monsieur Lecoq, published in 1868 by Émile Gaboriau, uses the term "Black Maria" when referring to a police van. The term was used in English translations of Solzhenitsyn's The Gulag Archipelago (in Russian these were called "black raven" "black voronok" or simply "voronok"; воронок). In his 1949 song "Saturday Night Fish Fry", Louis Jordan mentions a Black Maria. In a 1962 article in the Hackensack, New Jersey newspaper The Record, it claims that the name "Black Maria" is named after a "large and riotous London woman... She was often picked up by the police for excessive drinking on Saturday nights. When the van went by, people would say 'There goes Black Maria again!' and the word stuck."

The term is still used in parts of Britain for the vehicle that transports prisoners from gaol to court. Frequently, blackened-windowed buses are also used for the same purpose. Popular British band The Clash makes reference to the Black Maria in the song "The Guns of Brixton" on their seminal 1979 album London Calling:

You know it means no mercy
They caught him with a gun
No need for the Black Maria
Goodbye to the Brixton sun

The song refers to the London police's tendency of using a citizen's possession of a firearm to justify using deadly force, meaning that there would be no need to arrange transportation to custody.

== Modern use of police vans ==
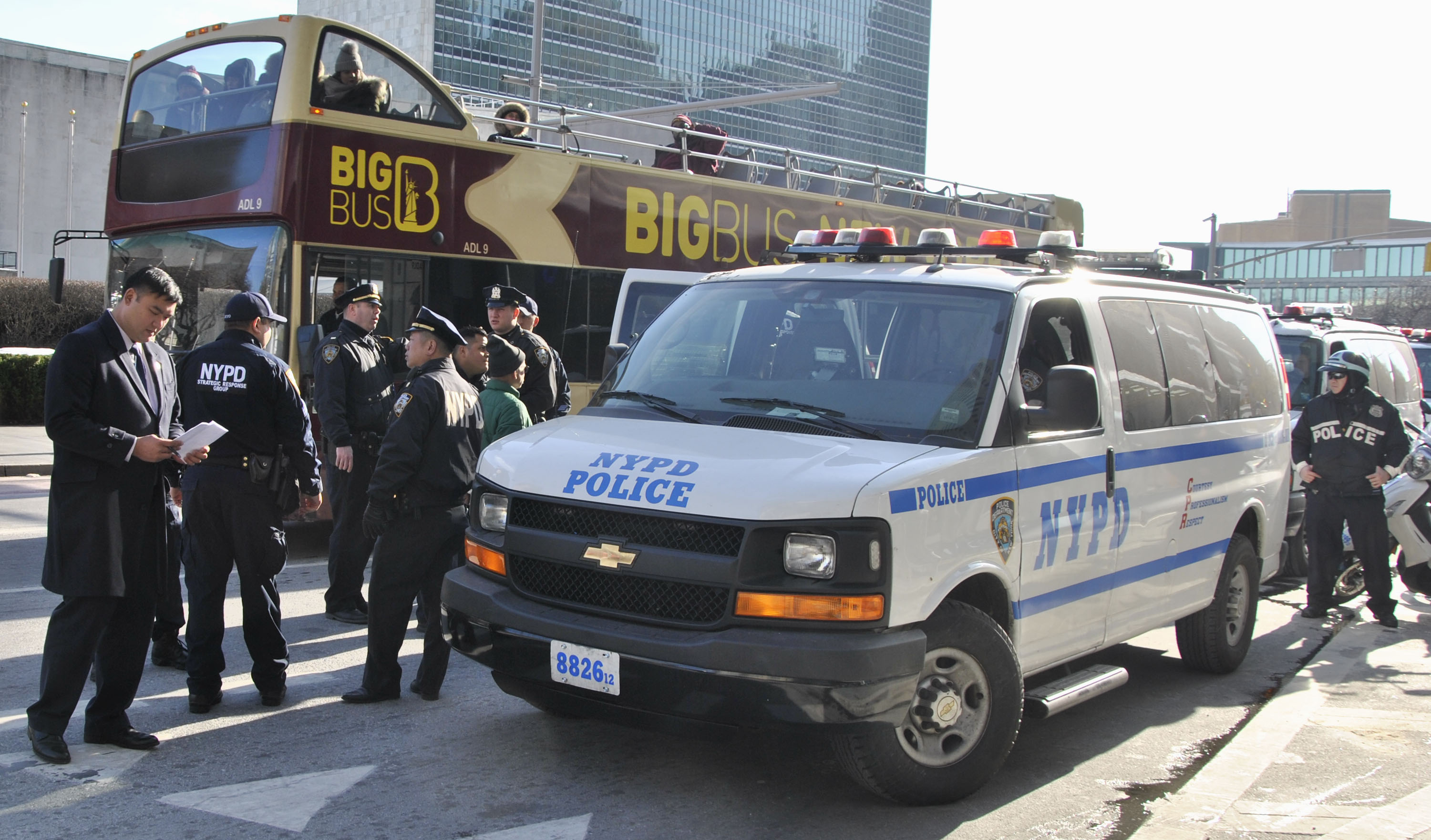
New York City Police Department officers with a Chevrolet Express police van

Individual police stations may have a van for the accommodation of prisoners and transportation of officers. The Metropolitan Police Service in England makes extensive use of these, particularly among the Territorial Support Group, which carries out public order duties and adapts the vans to carry riot protection equipment.

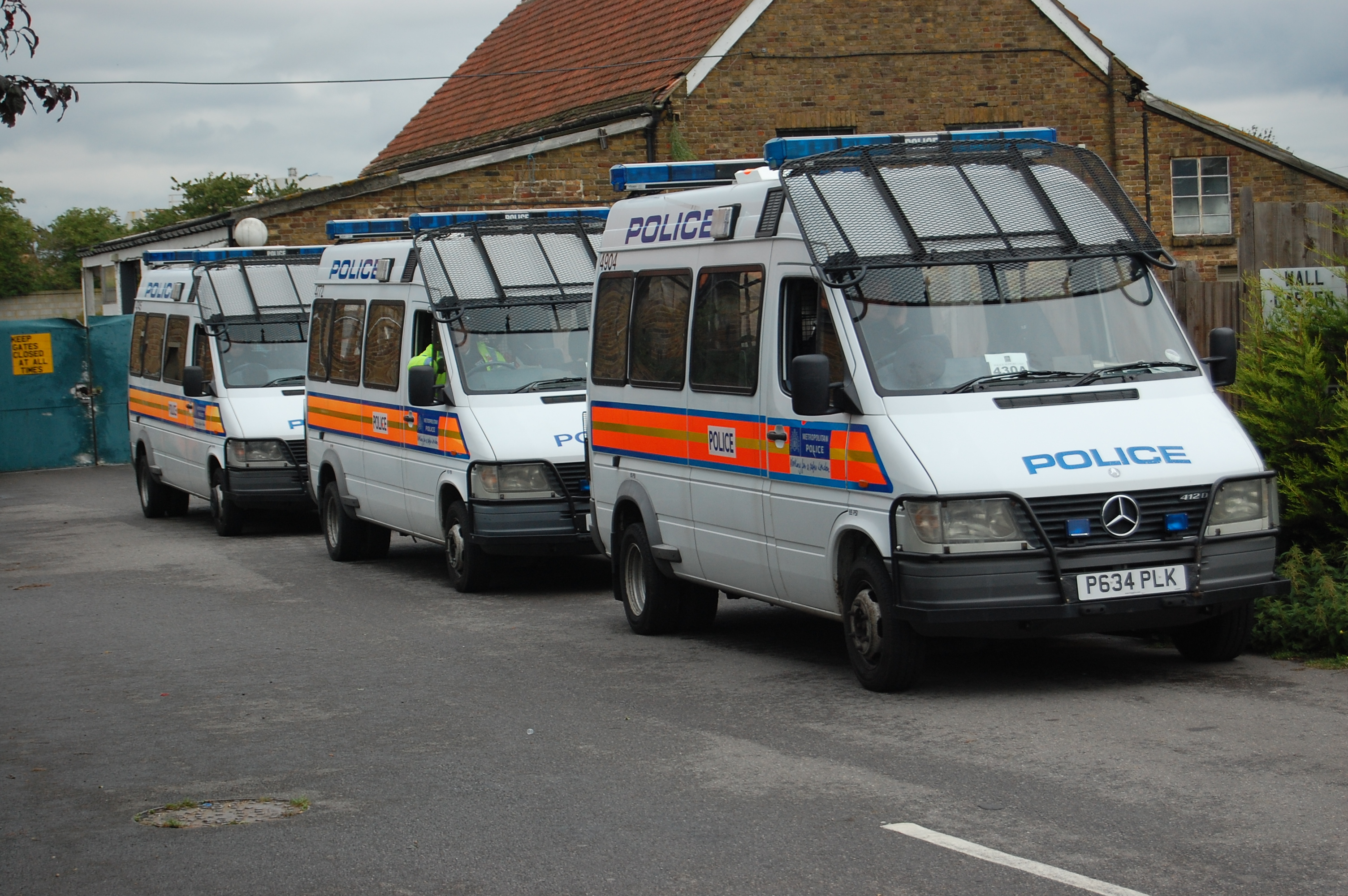
Metropolitan Police Territorial Support Group Mercedes Benz Sprinters with windscreen protectors.

In some countries, such as the United Kingdom and Ireland, police vans may have a flip down wire shield across the windscreen, which helps prevent projectiles from damaging the vehicle; this is common for riot police use.

Some police departments, such as the Baltimore Police Department and Philadelphia Police Department, have been accused of braking abruptly or steering sharply in order to inflict injuries on unbuckled prisoners, a technique called a "rough ride". Most notably, Freddie Gray allegedly died as a result of such a ride in 2015. Other prisoners have received large settlements after becoming paralyzed during transportation in police vans.

== See also ==
- Police car
- Police bus
- Prisoner transport vehicle
