= Frank Fowler Loomis =

American inventor (1854–1936)

Frank F. Loomis
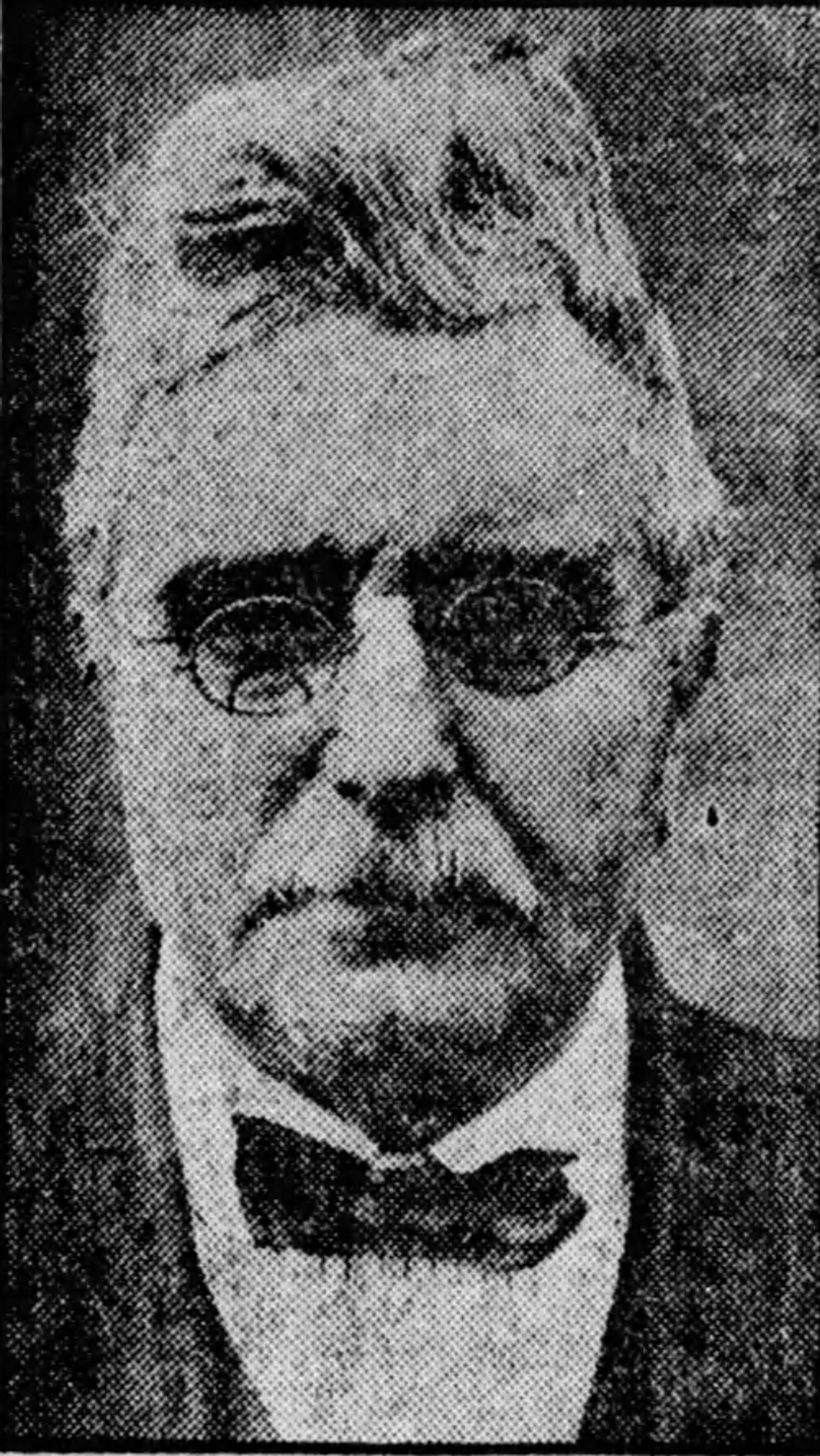
- Frank Fowler Loomis in 1915
- Born: April 2, 1854; Akron, Ohio
- Died: September 19, 1936 (aged 82); Akron, Ohio
- Occupations: Electrical and mechanical engineer
- Known for: Inventing the first police van
- Notable work: Fire alarm and control system

Frank Fowler Loomis (April 2, 1854 – September 19, 1936) was an American engineer and inventor who worked for the Akron, Ohio fire department. In 1874, Loomis, with the help of another engineer, developed four telegraph fire alarm boxes, which were patented in 1885. Loomis developed the city's fire alarm and control system and built the world's first police van, but it was stolen and destroyed during the Akron riot of 1900. The van was eventually restored and continued functioning for seven years before being overhauled in 1913. Loomis would also establish the "Loomis Award" in 1936 for fire service and heroism; only three firefighters received the award during its first fifty years.

== Early life ==
Loomis was born in Akron, Ohio, on April 2, 1854, as a son of Joseph and Elizabeth Loomis. He had an older brother, Charles H., who lived as a farmer in Sears, Michigan. Loomis attended Akron Public Schools until his father's death in January 1862, later living with an uncle in Wadsworth for the next seven years. In 1869, Loomis worked at Merrill's Pottery for a year, and became a volunteer fireman in the Akron fire department that same year. He later learned the blacksmith's trade before becoming a minuteman in a steamer in 1870. He slept at the fire station and worked as a street vendor during the day. His first job at the fire department was as a telephone operator, and he would sound the alarm to get volunteers in case of a fire. Loomis married on July 10, 1879, to Barbara Grad, in Akron.

== Career ==
In 1874, Loomis and another engineer developed and deployed four telegraph fire alarm boxes. These were placed at key businesses throughout the city of Akron. The system was in need of updates and further improvements, but the city would not fund it. The two of them and the fire chief purchased wire from a defunct telegraph line to make these improvements. It was soon realized that the operator could not give an accurate signal while under the influence of a fire. Loomis then developed an alarm box that worked by turning a crank, which then automatically gave the correct signal.

Loomis was promoted to city engineer in January 1881, and in 1885, he was granted a patent for an alarm box that worked by breaking glass and pulling a lever which opened the box and in turn sent out an automatic signal.

=== Police patrol wagon ===
The success of the fire alarm system led to Loomis designing a horseless carriage for the police department in the late 1890s. He declared that it would be completed within a month if the process went smoothly. The motorized patrol car, built by the Collins Buggy Company of Akron to Loomis' specifications and drawings, was an electric vehicle that weighed three tons with its battery. It was first developed with a telegraph key, but was later improved with the addition of a telephone. It had a capacity of 12 people and was powered by two 4-horsepower electric motors. The police car's storage batteries had to be charged every thirty miles. It came with a headlight and a bell to alert people it was coming. At the time of its inception, the police patrol car had three speeds and could go up to sixteen miles per hour. The patrol car, which was occasionally referred to as a "paddy wagon", was less expensive to maintain than a team of horses to pull a wagon to do the same job. In 1899, it became the world's first motorized police patrol car.

Visitors came from all over the United States to see the car, and replicas were soon put into operation in Cleveland, Chicago and New York City. A station was even built for police patrol cars. The streetcar was taken by a mob during the 1900 Akron riots, and was damaged and pushed into the Ohio and Erie Canal. It was restored, repaired and put into service for another seven years. The electric police patrol car was then completely overhauled in 1913. It was exhibited and became part of the 1915 Panama-Pacific International Exposition in San Francisco. It was later purchased by the Selle Company and scrapped in 1917.

== Later life and death ==
Loomis retired in 1910 and established the eponymous "Loomis Award" for fire service and heroism. It was originally established in 1936 and in the first 50 years only three firefighters received the award. Loomis later died on September 19, 1936.

== Gallery ==
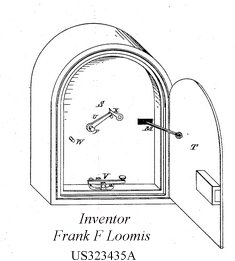
A diagram of a telegraph fire alarm box

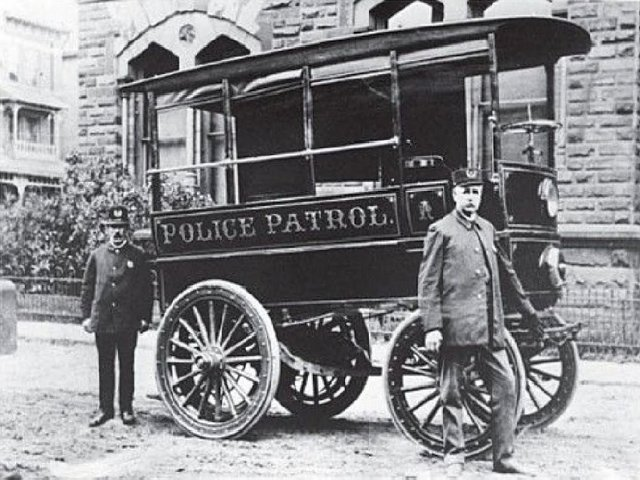
Frank Loomis with his police control car, c. 1900

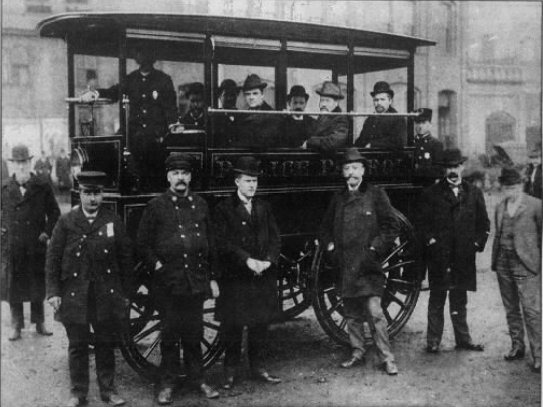
Publicity photo in 1899.

== Bibliography ==
- Perrin, William Henry (1881). History of Summit County. Baskin & Battey.
- Childress, Morton O. (2005). Louisville Division of Police. Turner Publishing Company. ISBN 978-1-59652-060-8. "The motorized patrol wagon began taking over the duties of the horse drawn 'paddy wagon.'"
- Chilton (1908). Operation & Maintenance. Chilton Class Journal Company. "This wagon was designed and built by F. F. Loomis, city electrician."
- Kane, Joseph Nathan (1997). Famous First Facts. H.W. Wilson. ISBN 978-0-8242-0661-1. "(#4137) The first police patrol wagon was designed by Frank Fowler Loomis of Akron, OH, and was placed in service by the Akron Police Department in June 1899. It had three speeds and could go 16 miles per hour. It was operated by electric power and weighed 5,500 pounds, including the batteries."
- Police Journal (1917). The Police Journal. The National Police Journal.
- Price, Mark J. (July 20, 2015). Lost Akron. Arcadia Publishing Incorporated. ISBN 978-1-62585-107-9. "A decade later, the Collins Buggy Co. made history of its own when it built the world's first motorized police wagon in 1899 for city engineer Frank Loomis."
- Price, Mark J. (November 27, 2017). Mafia Cop Killers in Akron. Arcadia Publishing Incorporated. ISBN 978-1-4396-6382-0. "Hooligans stole the Akron departments' pride and joy, the world's first motorized police wagon, a 5,500 pound, battery-powered vehicle built by city electrician Frank Loomis in 1899, and dumped it unceremoniously into the Ohio & Erie Canal."
- Wager, Richard (1975). Golden wheels. Western Reserve Historical Society. ISBN 978-0-911704-12-9.
- Robertson, Patrick (November 11, 2011). Robertson's Book of Firsts. Bloomsbury Publishing. ISBN 978-1-60819-738-5. "The First Police Car was an electric paddy wagon capable of speeds up to 16 mph that was built in 1899 by brothers Frank and C.H. Loomis for the Akron Police Department in Akron, Ohio."
