= Stark County Sheriff's Office =

Law enforcement agency

Jurisdictional structure
- Operations jurisdiction: Ohio, Stark County, United States
- Area: 575 square miles
- Population: 375,432

Operational structure
- Headquarters: 4500 Atlantic Blvd. N.E., Canton, Ohio 44705
- Agency executive: George T Maier (since 2014), Sheriff

Website
- Stark County Sheriff

The Stark County Sheriff's Office is a law enforcement agency which serves Stark County, Ohio, United States. The county is 575 square miles and has a population of 375,432 and the county seat is Canton, Ohio.

== Strip search lawsuits ==
A local woman, Hope Steffey, sued the Sheriff's Office, claiming that male and female deputies used excessive force and assaulted her when they stripped her naked after she was arrested. Hope Steffey had called the police after she had been assaulted. Television station WKYC obtained video of the incident from Hope Steffey's attorney, shows male and female deputies forcefully removing the clothing of the handcuffed woman, before leaving her to sit naked in a cell for six hours. Police allege that Steffey had threatened to harm herself when asked if she was suicidal, to which she replied in the affirmative. Around November 2008, Hope Steffey initiated civil action against the Sheriff's Office. Stark County agreed to pay Steffey $475,000 in an out-of-court settlement in July 2009. Additional actions against related civilian contractors were later dismissed by the court.

Former Attorney General Marc Dann launched the state investigation into the Steffey case in February 2008 before later resigning for unrelated reasons. A Grand Jury subsequently declined to indict the county deputies involved.

Valentina Dyshko, a Ukrainian woman with limited English capability, filed suit alleging that she was the victim of a strip search by male officers at the Stark County Jail. She had turned herself to Stark County Family Court in response to a misdemeanor warrant; the charge, having to do with home-schooling of her children, was later dismissed. In 2009 the case was settled by the county's insurance carrier for $49,500.

During the Steffey case, it was reported that 128 women had experienced these alleged strip searches, between 1999 and 2007. Privacy concerns prevented the identification of these women which led Steffey's lawyers to use billboards to encourage other women to come forward. Following the billboards and media reporting on the incident, five women, including Valentina Dyshko, came forward to report similar experiences with Stark County Sheriff's personnel. One of these women, "Elizabeth" (a pseudonym), was employed in a medium security jail and reported being accused of suicidal behavior and strip searched after being arrested for defending herself against inappropriate touching by a sheriff deputy during a traffic stop after she changed lanes without signaling. The sheriff accused her of failing a breath test when her asthma prevented her from blowing with sufficient strength. Only one case proceeded out of these five.
