= Ohio Bureau of Criminal Investigation =

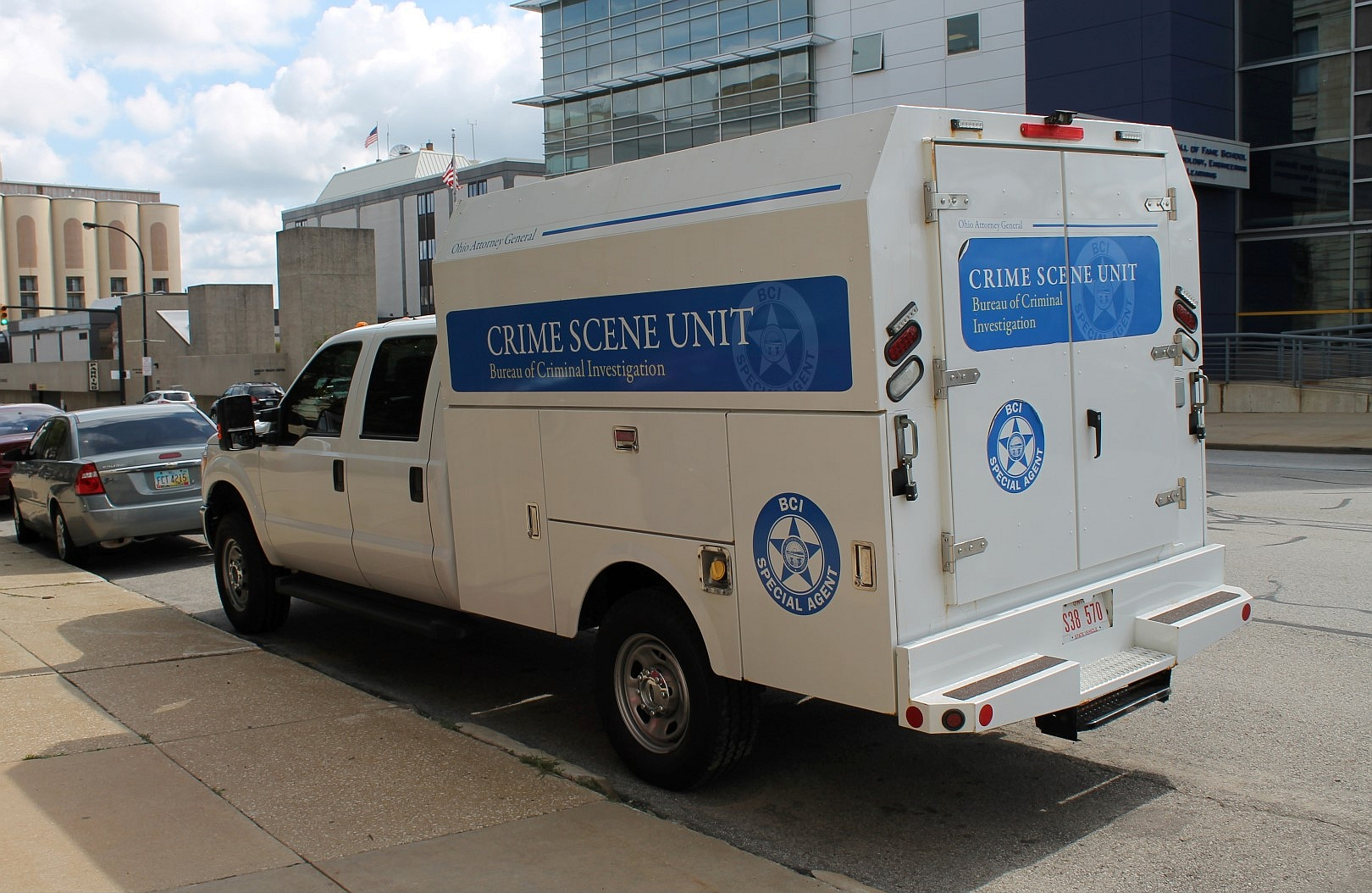
- BCI vehicle in Akron, Ohio

Agency overview
- Formed: July 9, 1921
- Employees: 300

Jurisdictional structure
- Operations jurisdiction: Ohio, US
- Legal jurisdiction: Ohio

Operational structure
- Headquarters: London, Ohio, US
- Parent agency: Attorney General’s Office

Website
- ohioattorneygeneral.gov/bci

The Ohio Bureau of Criminal Investigation (BCI) is a law enforcement agency for criminal investigation under the Office of the Attorney General of Ohio. It is headquartered in London, Ohio, United States.

== History ==
The department was founded on July 9, 1921. It began as a minor records keeping facility in conjunction with the Department of Public Welfare. A few years later, it was moved to the Department of Mental Hygiene and Corrections. The Department of Corrections originally housed BCI in the basement of the Ohio State Penitentiary in Columbus, Ohio until a fire and subsequent threat of riot by inmates in 1930 forced a move to the London Prison Farm.

During those early years, inmate labor performed most of the work. Archives show these inmates reviewing, indexing and sorting fingerprint records. In the 1940s, BCI also had a printing press, and used inmate labor to produce the book entitled, "The Science of Fingerprint Classification: As Taught and Used in the Ohio State Bureau of Identification and Investigation." Criminal investigations on a very small scale were carried out by the laboratory division. In 1959, an 11,350-square-foot (1,054 m^{2}) structure was erected in front of London Prison Farm. At the same time, the Investigations Division was formally added, investigative field agents were hired and the name was changed from Bureau of Criminal Identification to Bureau of Criminal Identification & Investigation.

In 1963, BCI was taken over by the Attorney General's Office and was given a broader range of activities. In 1972, Attorney General William Brown reorganized BCI into five separate divisions: identification, laboratory, investigations, administration, and data systems. In 1998 under the tutelage of former Attorney General Betty Montgomery, a $20.3 million, 122,000-square-foot (11,300 m^{2}) facility was erected which allowed BCI to be more visible to the community and expands its assistance to law enforcement. Since 1999, the Bureau has grown to staff more than 300 employees within its four main divisions: laboratory, investigations, administration, and identification.

== Divisions ==
=== Identification Division ===
The Identification Division maintains the official record of all individuals convicted of felonies in the state of Ohio. In addition, BCI operates the Automated Fingerprint Identification System, which allows law enforcement to conduct criminal record checks in an expedited manner. There is also a system, called WebCheck, that allows some civilian agencies, such as schools and hospitals, to conduct criminal records checks over the World Wide Web.

=== Investigation Division ===
The Investigation Division provides assistance to local law enforcement agencies in Ohio with the investigation of criminal activity. The services of the Investigative Division include: Environmental Law Enforcement and Training, Narcotics Enforcement, and Major Crimes Investigation. The Major Crimes Investigation department includes Crime Scene units, Criminal Intelligence units, Computer Crimes units, and Special Investigations units.

=== Crime Labs ===
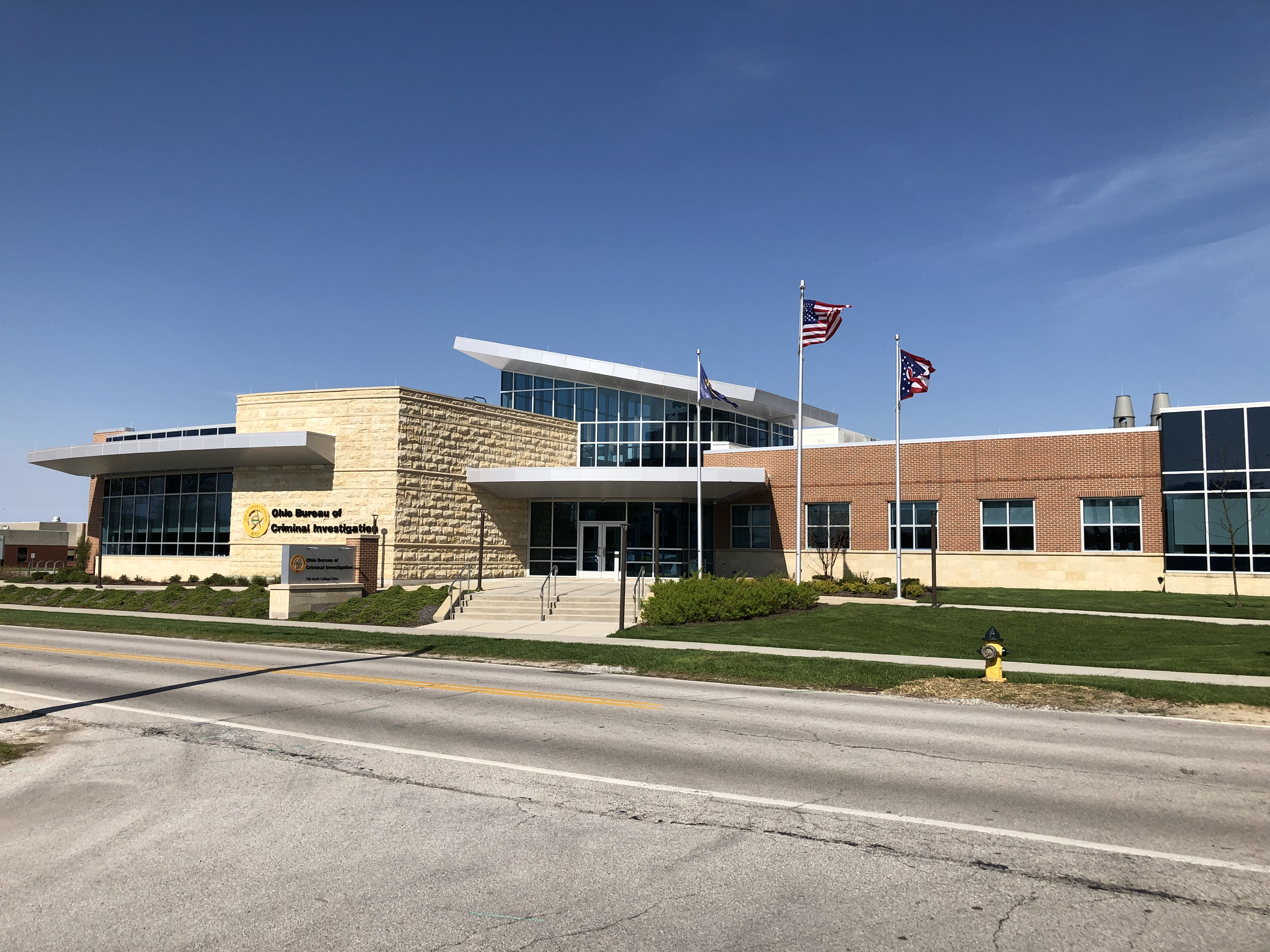
The crime lab on the campus of Bowling Green State University.

The BCI operates three crime labs in Ohio. They are located in London, Bowling Green, and Richfield.

== Locations ==
In addition to their headquarters in London, BCI operates field offices in:

- Youngstown
- Bowling Green
- Cambridge
- Richfield
- Athens
- Springfield

== See also ==
- List of law enforcement agencies in Ohio
