= 2017 Cincinnati mayoral election =

- November 7, 2017
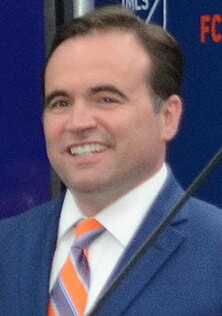

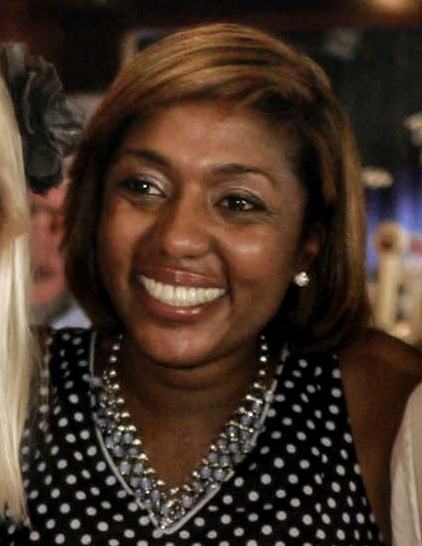
Candidate	John Cranley	Yvette Simpson
Party	Nonpartisan	Nonpartisan
Popular vote	33,446	29,045
Percentage	53.52%	46.48%
Mayor before election
John Cranley
Democratic
Elected mayor
John Cranley
Democratic

The 2017 Cincinnati mayoral election took place on November 7, 2017, to elect the Mayor of Cincinnati, Ohio. The election was officially nonpartisan, with the top two candidates from the May 2 primary election advancing to the general election, regardless of party. Incumbent Democratic Mayor John Cranley won re-election to a second term.

While the election was nonpartisan, all the candidates were known Democrats.

== Primary election ==
=== Candidates ===
==== Declared ====
- John Cranley (D), incumbent Mayor of Cincinnati
- Rob Richardson Jr. (D), former University of Cincinnati board chairman
- Yvette Simpson (D), Cincinnati City Council member

==== Declined ====
- Greg Hartmann (R), former Hamilton County Commissioner
- Charlie Winburn (R), Cincinnati City Council member

=== Endorsements ===
John Cranley

Ohio State Representatives

- Brigid Kelly

City Council members

- Kevin Flynn
- David S. Mann, Vice Mayor of Cincinnati
- Christopher Smitherman

County officials

- Denise Driehaus, Hamilton County Commissioner
- Jim Neil, Hamilton County Sheriff
- Todd Portune, Hamilton County Commissioner
- Dusty Rhodes, Hamilton County Auditor
- Lakshmi Sammarco, Hamilton County Coroner

Labor unions

- AFL–CIO
- AFSCME - American Federation of State, County and Municipal Employees
- AWIU - International Association of Heat and Frost Insulators and Allied Workers
- FOP - Fraternal Order of Police
- IAFF - International Association of Fire Fighters
- IBEW - International Brotherhood of Electrical Workers
- UA - United Association of Journeymen and Apprentices of the Plumbing, Pipefitting and Sprinkler Fitting Industry of the United States and Canada

Organizations

- Ohio Democratic Party
Rob Richardson

Labor unions

- International Association of Bridge, Structural, Ornamental and Reinforcing Iron Workers
- LIUNA - Laborers' International Union of North America
Yvette Simpson

City Council members

- Chris Seelbach
- Wendell Young

Notable individuals

- Marian Spencer, civil rights activist and former Vice Mayor of Cincinnati

Organizations

- Charter Committee
- Cincinnati Women's Political Caucus
- Democracy for America

=== Polling ===
Poll source	Date(s) administered	Sample size	Margin of error	John Cranley	Rob Richardson Jr.	Yvette Simpson	Undecided
Greenberg Quinlan Rosner Research	February 27-March 2, 2017	500	± 4.4%	40%	11%	39%	7%

=== Results ===
Primary election results
Party	Candidate	Votes	%
Nonpartisan	Yvette Simpson	10,562	45.14
Nonpartisan	John Cranley	8,068	34.48
Nonpartisan	Rob Richardson, Jr.	4,769	20.38
Total votes		23,399	100.00

== General election ==
=== Candidates ===
- John Cranley (D), incumbent Mayor of Cincinnati
- Yvette Simpson (D), Cincinnati City Council member, President Pro-Tempore

=== Endorsements ===
John Cranley

Ohio State Representatives

- Brigid Kelly

City Council members

- Kevin Flynn
- David S. Mann, Vice Mayor of Cincinnati
- Christopher Smitherman

County officials

- Denise Driehaus, Hamilton County Commissioner
- Jim Neil, Hamilton County Sheriff
- Todd Portune, Hamilton County Commissioner
- Dusty Rhodes, Hamilton County Auditor
- Lakshmi Sammarco, Hamilton County Coroner

Labor unions

- AFL–CIO
- AFSCME - American Federation of State, County and Municipal Employees
- AWIU - International Association of Heat and Frost Insulators and Allied Workers
- FOP - Fraternal Order of Police
- IAFF - International Association of Fire Fighters
- IBEW - International Brotherhood of Electrical Workers
- UA - United Association of Journeymen and Apprentices of the Plumbing, Pipefitting and Sprinkler Fitting Industry of the United States and Canada

Organizations

- Ohio Democratic Party
Yvette Simpson

City Council members

- Chris Seelbach
- Wendell Young

Notable individuals

- Marian Spencer, civil rights activist and former Vice Mayor of Cincinnati

Organizations

- Charter Committee
- Cincinnati Women's Political Caucus
- Democracy for America
- The Collective PAC
- #VOTEPROCHOICE

=== Polling ===
Poll source	Date(s) administered	Sample size	Margin of error	John Cranley	Yvette Simpson	Undecided
Greenberg Quinlan Rosner Research	February 27-March 2, 2017	500	± 4.4%	43%	50%	5%

=== Results ===
Cincinnati mayoral election, 2017
Party	Candidate	Votes	%
Nonpartisan	John Cranley	33,446	53.52
Nonpartisan	Yvette Simpson	29,045	46.48
Total votes		62,491	100.00
