= Cincinnati City Council =

Lawmaking body of Cincinnati, Ohio, United States

- City Council

Type
- Type: City Council
- Houses: Unicameral

Leadership
- Vice Mayor: Jan Michele Kearney, Democratic since January 4, 2022
- President Pro Tempore: Scotty Johnson, Democratic since January 6, 2026

Structure
- Seats: Nine
- Political groups: Democratic (9)

Elections
- Voting system: at-large
- Last election: November 7, 2025
- Next election: November 4, 2027

Meeting place
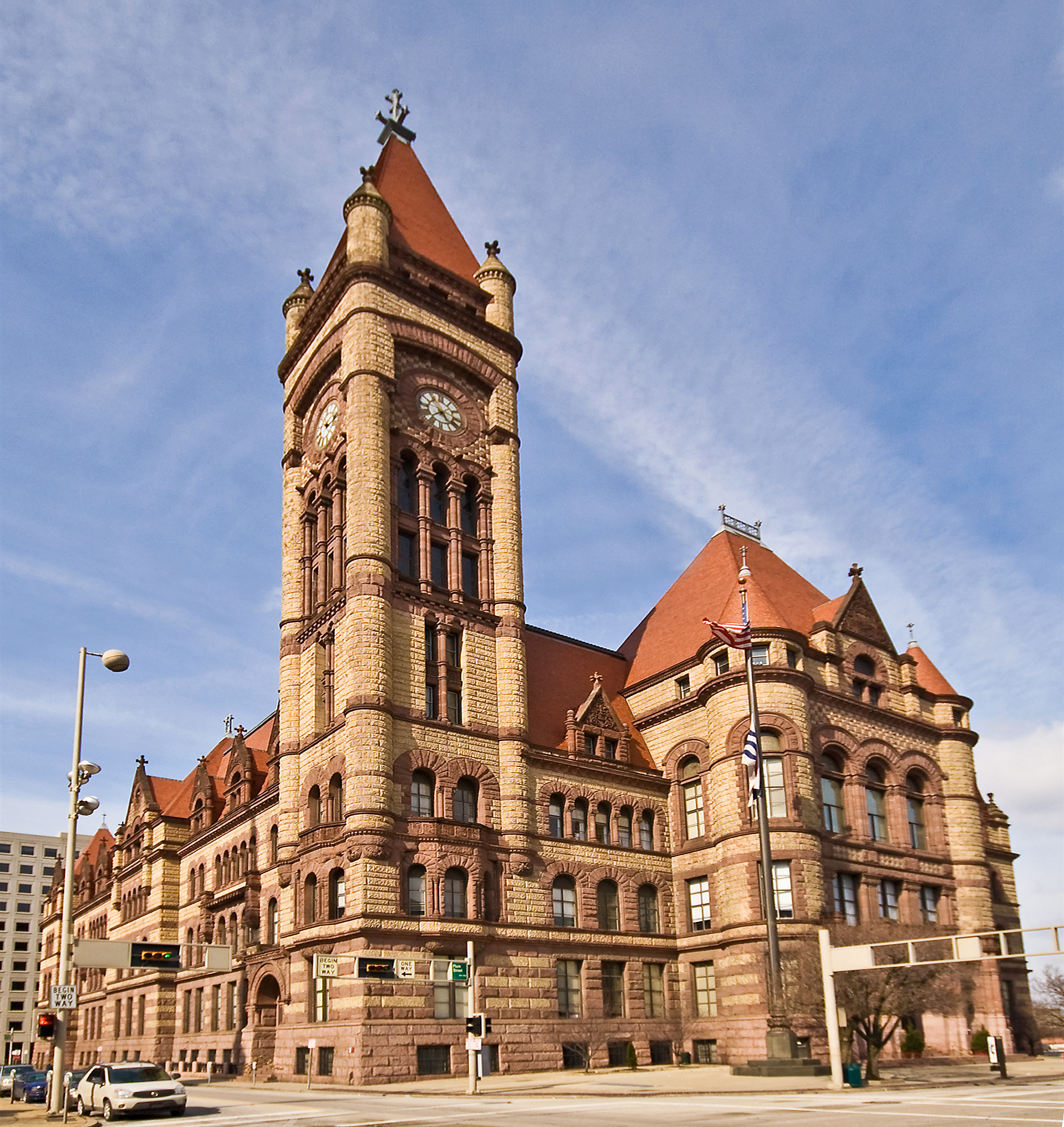
- Cincinnati City Hall; 801 Plum St, Cincinnati, Ohio 45202

Website
- http://www.cincinnati-oh.gov/council/

Constitution
- Charter

The Cincinnati City Council is the lawmaking body of Cincinnati, Ohio. The nine-member city council is elected at-large in a single election in which each voter chooses nine candidates from the field. The nine top vote-getters win seats on the council for a two-year term.

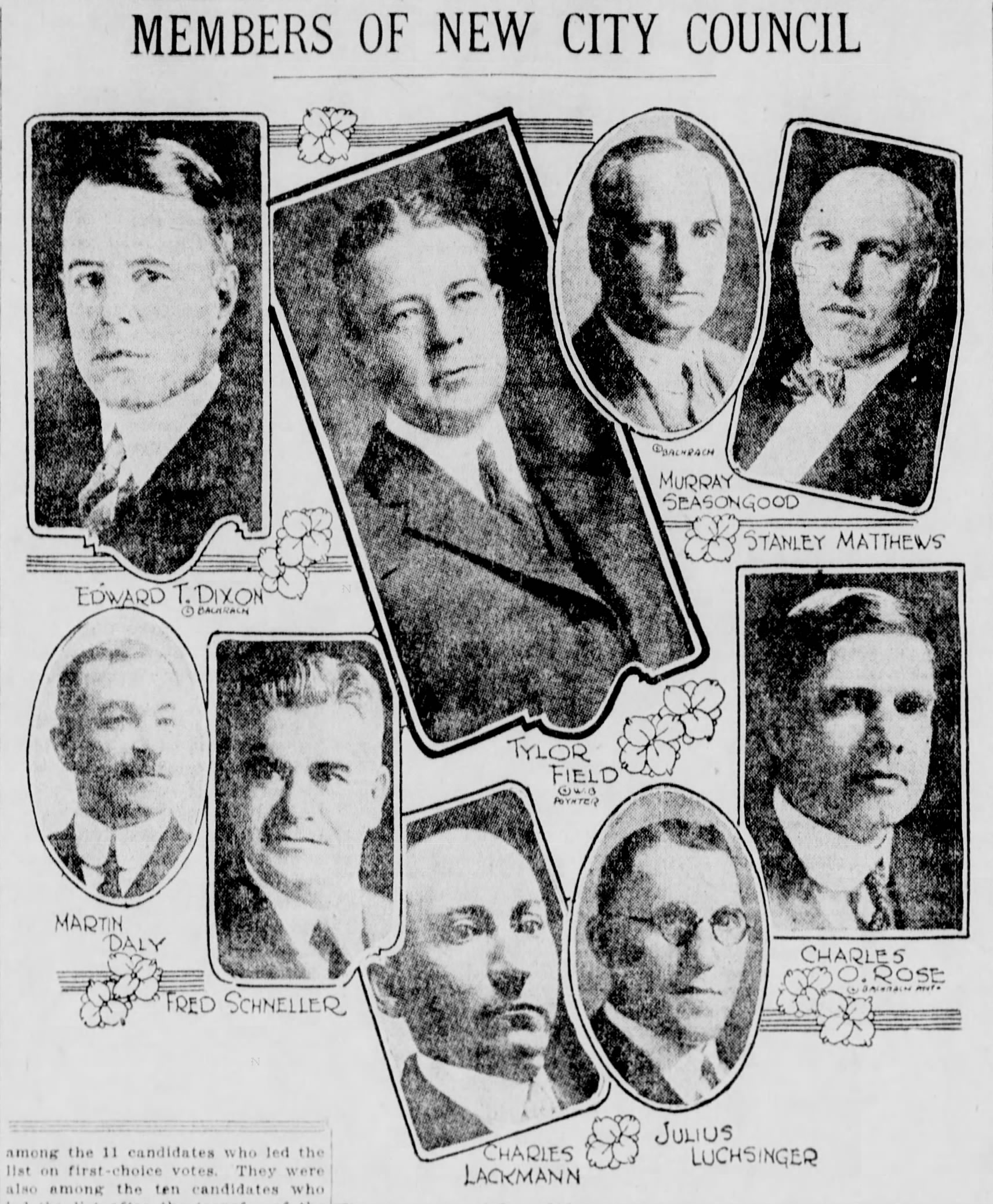
1925 city council election winners using single transferable vote

Until the charter of 1925, the council comprised 32 members—six elected at-large and 26 elected from single-member wards. The 1925 charter instituted the present nine-member council elected in a single non-partisan, at-large election. From 1925 to 1955, elections were under the single transferable vote form of proportional representation. The mayor was chosen by the council from among its members. In the 1970s, the system was changed so that the top vote-getter in the council election automatically became mayor. Since 2001, the mayor is chosen in a separate election.

Although the election officially is non-partisan, the local Charterite party and three of the major political parties (Democratic, Republican, and Green Party) all endorse candidates in the race. Party designations, however, can be fluid. After the 1997 election, for example, Democrats Minette Cooper and Dwight Tillery formed a majority coalition on the council with Republicans Charlie Winburn, Phil Heimlich, and Jeanette Cissell.

Prior to 2013, council members were elected for two-year terms. In 2013, a referendum was passed changing City Council to four-year terms. In 2018, two competing proposals were placed on the ballot to modify the structure of the City Council yet again. Issue 10 would bring back two-year terms; Issue 11 would keep four-year terms but stagger them, such that five council members would be elected in a mayoral election year, and four council members would be elected two years later. Issue 10 passed with a larger margin of victory, and the City Council returned to two-year terms beginning with the 2021 election.

The next city council election is scheduled for November 2027.

== Cincinnati City Council members ==
Council Member	Party	First elected	Other Positions	Notes
Jan-Michele Kearney	Democrat	2020 (Appointed)	Vice Mayor	Replaced Tamaya Dennard on March 11, 2020, who resigned after federal charges of bribery.
Jeff Cramerding	Democrat	2021		
Mark Jeffreys	Democrat	2021		
Scotty Johnson	Democrat	2021		
Meeka Owens	Democrat	2021		
Seth Walsh	Democrat	2022 (Appointed)		Replaced Greg Landsman on December 19, 2022, who resigned to serve OH-01
Anna Albi	Democrat	2023		
Evan Nolan	Democrat	2024 (Appointed)		Replaced Reggie Harris on October 11, 2024, who resigned to serve as the deputy assistant secretary of economic development in the United States Department of Housing and Urban Development
Ryan James	Democrat	2025		

== Election results ==
Italic type indicates incumbent.
(D) indicates Democratic Party candidate.
(R) indicates Republican Party candidate.
(G) indicates Green party candidate.
(C) indicates Charter Committee candidate.
(I) indicates no party affiliation.

Year	Winning candidates	Losing candidates
2025	Jan-Michele Kearney (D): 43,971; Scotty Johnson (D): 40,781; Meeka D. Owens (D):39,826; Anna Albi (D): 39,028; Mark Jeffreys (D): 38,380; Seth Walsh (D): 36,176; Jeff Cramerding (D): 34,870; Evan Nolan (D): 34,790; Ryan James (D): 33,689	Liz Keating (C, R): 24,526; Christopher Smitherman (I): 17,496
2023	Jan-Michele Kearney (D): 49,033; Meeka D. Owens (D): 48,825; Reggie Harris (D):48,443; Victoria Parks (D): 45,490; Scotty Johnson (D): 44,899; Mark Jeffreys (D): 44,544; Anna Albi (D): 43,973; Jeff Cramerding (D): 41,983; Seth Walsh (D): 39,950	Liz Keating (C, R): 36,176
2021	Jan-Michele Kearney (D): 28,161; Greg Landsman (D): 26,532; Reggie Harris (D):25,305; Meeka Owens (D): 24,177; Victoria Parks (D): 22,443; Scotty Johnson (D): 19,888; Jeff Cramerding (D): 19,356; Mark Jeffreys (D): 18,433; Liz Keating (C, R): 17,156	Michelle Dillingham (I): 15,618; Philip O'Neal (D): 14,995; Kevin Flynn (C): 13,665; Betsy Sundermann (R): 13,599; Steve Goodin (C, R): 12,594; Jim Tarbell (C): 11,526; Brian Garry (I): 10,066; Thomas Brinkman (R): 9,642; John Williams (C): 8,200; LaKeisha Cook (I): 7,021; Jackie Frondorf (C): 6,815; Jaime Castle (I): 6,266; Peterson Mingo (I): 5,163; Evan Holt (DSA): 5,013; Kurt Grossman (I): 4,876; Bill Frost (C): 4,614; Galen Gordon (C): 4,107; Stacy Smith (I): 4,007; Te'Airea Powell (I): 3,988; Jalen Alford (I): 3,066; Rob Harris II (I):2,587; Andrew Kennedy (I):2,393; John Maher (I): 2,117; Logan Simmering (G): 1,608; K.A. Heard Jr (G):1,461; Nick Jabin (I): 1,319
2017	P.G. Sittenfeld (D): 39,815; David Mann (C, D): 35,789; Chris Seelbach (D): 30,626; Wendell Young (D): 28,295; Christopher Smitherman (I): 27,149; Tamaya Dennard (C, D): 26,053; Greg Landsman (D): 25,049; Amy Murray (C, R): 23,888; Jeff Pastor (R): 21,996	Michelle Dillingham (D): 21,773; Ozie Davis (D): 18,671; Lesley Jones (D): 18,345; Laure Quinlivan (I): 16,758; Derek Bauman (C): 16,680; Henry Frondorf (C): 10,637; Seth Maney (R): 10,114; Brian Garry (G): 9,152; Kelli Prather (I): 7,175; Tamie Sullivan (G): 6,232; Tonya Dumas (I): 6,186; Erica L. Black-Johnson (I): 5,539; Cristina Burcica (I): 4,150; Manuel Foggie (I): 3,556; Dadrien Washington (I): 125
2013	P.G. Sittenfeld (D): 37,484; Charlie Winburn (R): 27,397; David Mann (C, D): 26,443; Yvette Simpson (C, D): 25,449; Chris Seelbach (D): 23,738; Christopher Smitherman (I): 23,604; Wendell Young (D): 22,600; Kevin Flynn (C): 22,059; Amy Murray (C, R): 21,979	Laure Quinlivan (D): 21,079; Greg Landsman (C, D): 19,619; Michelle Dillingham (D): 19,143; Pam Thomas (D): 18,499; Vanessa White (C): 16,892; Sam Malone (R): 16,462; Mellisa Wegman (R): 9,942; Shawn Butler (D): 9,788; Mike Moroski (I): 8,688; Angela Beamon (I): 7,943; Kevin Johnson (I): 6,647; Timothy Joseph Dorsbrusch (I): 4,006
2011	Roxanne Qualls (C, D): 38,903; P.G. Sittenfeld (D): 31,673; Wendell Young (D): 30,526; Cecil Thomas (D): 30,405; Charlie Winburn (R): 30,080; Laure Quinlivan (D): 28,601; Yvette Simpson (C, D): 28,589; Christopher Smitherman (I): 24,981; Chris Seelbach (D): 24,494	Chris Bortz (C): 22,805; Kevin Flynn (C): 22,631; Amy Murray (R): 22,096; Leslie Ghiz (R): 21,391; Jason Riveiro (D): 19,025; Wayne Lippert (R): 18,973; Mike Allen (I): 17,167; Nicholas Hollan (D): 15,309; Catherine Smith Mills (R): 13,913; Pat McCollum (I): 6,497; Kathy Atkinson (I): 5,220; Jacqueline Allen (I): 4,829; Sandra Queen Noble (I): 2,890; Orlando Welborn (I): 34
2009	Roxanne Qualls (C, D): 43,513; Cecil Thomas (D): 35,690; Chris Bortz (C): 32,911; Jeff Berding (I): 30,509; Leslie Ghiz (R): 30,050; Chris Monzel (R): 29,786; Charlie Winburn (R): 29,055; Y. Laketa Cole (D): 28,976; Laure Quinlivan (D): 28,775	Greg Harris (D): 25,216; Bernadette Watson (D): 24,985; Amy Murray (R): 23,667; Kevin Flynn (C): 23,619; Wendell Young (D): 22,100; Tony Fischer (D): 21,742; Nicholas Hollan (D): 18,096; George Zamary (R): 12,834; Anitra Brockman (G): 8,071; LaMarque Ward (I): 7,806
2007	Roxanne Qualls (C): 33,775; John Cranley (D): 33,772; David Crowley (D): 31,124; Cecil Thomas (D): 27,103; Chris Bortz (C): 26,500; Leslie Ghiz (R): 24,920; Y. Laketa Cole (D): 24,900; Jeff Berding (D): 23,586; Chris Monzel (R): 23,336	Charlie Winburn (R): 22,080; Minette Cooper (D): 18,941; Sam Malone (R): 17,486; Melanie Bates (C): 15,376; Pat Fischer (R): 15,084; Greg Harris (D): 14,184; John Eby (R): 14,025; Wendell Young (D): 13,963; Brian Garry (D): 13,164; Joan Kaup (C): 8,476; Andre Harper (R): 7,499; Justin Jeffre (G): 7,371; Mitch Painter (I): 5,140; Steve Pavelish (I): 4,213; Michael Earl Patton (I): 3,149; George Zamary (I): 2,203
2005	John Cranley (D): 35,603; James R. Tarbell (C): 32,392; Y. Laketa Cole (D): 29,966; David Crowley (D): 29,856; Leslie Ghiz (R): 29,758; Jeff Berding (D): 28,344; Chris Monzel (R): 27,911; Chris Bortz (C): 27,304; Cecil Thomas (D): 27,091	Sam Malone (R): 25,838; Christopher Smitherman (C/G): 24,642; Damon Lynch III (D): 22,556; Wendell Young (D): 21,505; Eve Bolton (D): 19,729; John Eby (R): 16,272; Samantha Herd (D): 14,306; Nick Spencer (C): 9,462; Paul Mcghee (I): 5,407; Gerry Kraus (I): 4,719; William S. "Stew" Mathews II (I): 3,915; Robert J. Wilking (I): 3,762; Ishaq Nadir (I): 3,208; Eric Wilson (I): 3,082; Michael Earl Patton (I): 2,770; Curtis Wells (I): 2,482; Robert Wilson (I): 2,319; Ronnie T. Stallworth (I): 2,271; Bill Barron (I): 1,849; Bennie Green (I): 1,800; Victor Phillips (I): 1,695; Antonio Hodge (I): 1,276
2003	David Pepper (D): 34,405; Alicia Reece (D): 32,078; Y. Laketa Cole (D): 27,644; James R. Tarbell (C): 27,480; John Cranley (D): 26,980; R. Patrick DeWine (R): 26,573; Christopher Smitherman (C, G): 25,483; Sam Malone (R): 24,002; David Crowley (D): 22,713	Damon Lynch III (I): 21,764; Leslie Ghiz (R): 19,916; Chris Monzel (R): 19,197; Barbara W. Trauth (I): 17,480; John Connelly (I): 14,047; Pete Witte (I): 13,479; Terry Deters (I): 11,889; John F. Schlagetter (C): 11,420; Tom Jones (I): 10,441; Samuel T. Britton (I): 9,778; Howard H. Bond (I): 8,260; Nick Spencer (C): 7,378; Marilyn Hyland (I): 5,864; Brian Garry (G): 5,504; Eric Wilson (I): 2,686; Glenn O. Givens Sr. (I): 2,327; Larry J. Frazier (I): 2,323
2001	David Pepper (D): 45,174; R. Patrick DeWine (R): 43,191; Alicia Reece (D): 43,180; Minette Cooper (D): 38,040; John Cranley (D): 36,998; James R. Tarbell (C): 35,533; David Crowley: (D): 33,225; Paul Booth (D): 27,732; Chris Monzel (R): 26,479	Y. Laketa Cole (D): 24,567; Todd Ward (R): 23,895; Sam Malone (R): 23,211; Jane Anderson (I): 21,026; Akiva Freeman (I): 19,788; Dawn Denno (I): 19,598; Lawra Baumann (I): 17,686; Ken Anderson (I): 15,119; Clarence D. Williams III (I): 14,371; Nathaniel Livingston Jr. (I): 12,735; Tom Jones (I): 12,235; John F. Schlagetter (C): 10,269; William Kirkland (I): 6,211; Theo Barnes (I): 4,795; Eric Wilson (I): 4,376; Wes Flinn (I): 3,682; Toni Andrews (I): 3,651
1999	Mayor: Charles J. Luken (D): 42,022; Todd Portune (D): 36,333; Charlie Winburn (R): 34,176; Phil Heimlich (R): 31,487; Alicia Reece (D): 27,900; R. Patrick DeWine (R): 27,745; James R. Tarbell (C): 26,045; Minette Cooper (D): 25,277; Paul Booth (D): 22,667	Jeanette Cissell (R): 22,095; Diane Goldsmith (R): 21,250; Scott V. Seidewitz (D): 20,389; Kaye M. Britton (D): 19,300; Forrest L. Buckley (D): 19,248; Jane Anderson (I): 17,297; Ken Anderson (I): 15,433; Chris Monzel (R): 9,335; Sam Malone (I): 5,030; Theo Barnes (I): 4,885; Charlie Lee Gardner (I): 3,312
1997	Mayor: Roxanne Qualls (D): 50,560; Dwight Tillery (D): 45,238; Todd Portune (D): 42,721; Charlie Winburn (R): 39,913; Bobbie L. Sterne (C): 39,529; Phil Heimlich (R): 37,896; Tyrone Yates (D): 35,592; Minette Cooper (D): 35,451; Jeanette Cissell (R): 34,209	James R. Tarbell (C): 33,867; Forrest Buckley (D): 25,357; Diane Goldsmith (R): 22,676; Kaye Britton (D): 20,724; Rosemary Meyer (R): 18,976; Todd Ward (R): 18,438; Bryn Lewis (C): 10,135; William Gaz (R): 9,213; Theo Barnes (I): 6,051
1995	Mayor: Roxanne Qualls (D): 49,165; Phil Heimlich (R): 48,072; Dwight Tillery (D): 45,616; Bobbie L. Sterne (C): 40,663; Nick Vehr (R): 40,207; Minette Cooper (D): 40,105; Charlie Winburn (R): 38,963; Todd Portune (D): 36,308; Tyrone Yates (D): 33,644	Jeannette Cissell (R): 31,960; Mark Longabaugh (D): 30,969; John Kruse (R): 28,098; John Mirlisena (D): 27,379; Diane Goldsmith (R): 26,627; Norman Murdock (R): 24,369; Don Driehaus (D): 22,961; Elwood Cromwell III (R): 9,109; John Henry Simmons (I): 4,354
1993	Mayor: Roxanne Qualls (D): 48,476; Dwight Tillery (D): 45,928; Nick Vehr (R): 45,494; Bobbie L. Sterne (C): 43,077; Thomas A. Luken (D): 39,771; Charlie Winburn (R): 39,670; Tyrone Yates (D): 36,204; Todd Portune (D): 34,460; Phil Heimlich (R): 33,873	John Mirlisena (D): 32,915; Virginia Rhodes (D): 29,327; Jeannette Cissell (R): 27,504; Martin Wade (R): 26,224; Anne Power (R): 25,232; John Kruse (R): 24,713; Nell D. Surber (R): 23,714; Eric Kearney (C): 23,138; Val Sena (C): 18,131; Matthew Rosen (D): 15,851; Barbara Milton (D): 14,078; Pat Clifford (I): 7,759
1991	Mayor: Dwight Tillery (D): 52,020; Guy Guckenberger (I): 49,793; David S. Mann (D): 48,595; John Mirlisena (D): 47,655; Peter J. Strauss (D): 45,577; James Cissell (R): 42,467; Bobbie L. Sterne (C): 40,697; Roxanne Qualls (D): 38,543; Tyrone Yates (C): 36,548	Nick Vehr (R): 33,277; Virginia Rhodes (D): 32,240; Nell D. Surber (R): 27,281; William Al'Uqdah (R): 21,846; Martin Wade (R): 19,993; Shirley Rosser (D): 18,189; Jay Andress (R): 16,807; Mary Ann Brown (R): 15,290; Val Sena (C): 14,886; Len Garrett (R): 12,365; Richard L. Buchanan (D): 11,655; Chaunston Brown (D): 10,461; Todd O'Neal (I): 9,684; John Cheng (I): 6,866; Claudia Miller (I): 6,337; Anita F. Bolce (I): 6,712; Dennis L. Maxberry (I): 3,336
