= Christopher Smitherman =

American politician (born 1967)

Vice mayor of Cincinnati
- In office January 2, 2018 – January 4, 2022
- Mayor: John Cranley
- Preceded by: David S. Mann
- Succeeded by: Jan-Michele Kearney

Member of Cincinnati City Council
- In office December 1, 2011 – January 4, 2022
- In office December 1, 2003 – December 1, 2005

Chair of the Law and Public Safety Committee
- In office December 1, 2013 – January 4, 2022
- Preceded by: Cecil Thomas

Member of the Cincinnati Planning Commission
- In office January 2, 2018 – January 4, 2022

President of the Cincinnati NAACP
- In office April 2007 – January 1, 2014
- Preceded by: Ishtnn Morton
- Succeeded by: Robert Richardson Sr.

Personal details
- Born: Christopher E.C. Smitherman; July 16, 1967 (age 59) Cincinnati, Ohio, U.S.
- Party: Independent
- Spouse: Pamela M.T. Smitherman (m. 1990; died 2019)
- Children: 5
- Education: Bowling Green State University; Ohio State University; School for Creative and Performing Arts
- Website: Official city website

Christopher E.C. Smitherman (born July 16, 1967) is an American politician and businessman who previously served as the Vice Mayor of Cincinnati, Ohio. An Independent, Smitherman has been a member of the Cincinnati City Council and the Cincinnati Planning Commission. Smitherman is the former president of the Cincinnati NAACP, serving from April 2007 to January 2014. From 2013 until January 2022 – when Smitherman was term limited and a newly elected council was sworn in – Smitherman chaired the Law and Public Safety Committee, giving him authority to oversee all legislative issues related to Police, Fire, Safety Policies, Citizen Complaint Authority, Liquor Licenses, and Public Services.

== Background and education ==
=== Early life ===
Smitherman was born on July 16, 1967, in Cincinnati, Ohio. His father, Herbert Smitherman, was a chemist and the first African-American with a PhD hired at Procter & Gamble (P&G). His mother, Mrs. Barbara Smitherman, was a teacher and administrator at Cincinnati Public Schools. Smitherman has five siblings – one sister and four brothers.

=== Education ===
Raised Catholic, Smitherman attended St. Mark Elementary for primary school. Smitherman then became a product of Cincinnati Public Schools (CPS), attending the School for Creative and Performing Arts (SCPA) in Cincinnati, Ohio. After graduating, Smitherman attended Ohio State University (OSU) where he earned a bachelor's degree in criminal justice. After completing his undergraduate program, Smitherman moved to Bowling Green, Ohio, to attend Bowling Green State University (BGSU) where he obtained a master's degree in counseling. It was at BGSU that Smitherman met his wife, Pamela. Throughout his time in college, Smitherman worked as a resident advisor (RA) and, in 1990, Smitherman accepted full-time employment as a hall manager at BGSU. While studying for his master's, Smitherman began hosting a workshop called "Let's Talk About Race."

=== Career ===
Smitherman is a Financial Planner and small business owner. He has owned and operated his financial planning practice since returning to Cincinnati in 1997. In 2009, Smitherman purchased the old Bond Hill Library and relocated his financial planning office to the building located in Bond Hill, Cincinnati. As a financial planner, Smitherman focuses on helping his clients gain wealth through systematic savings, life insurance, and estate planning.

Christopher and Pamela Smitherman in January 2014

=== Family life ===
Pamela M.T. and Christopher E.C. Smitherman married in 1990 and, in 1997, returned to Cincinnati and settled in the neighborhood of North Avondale. Together, they raised five children – four boys and one girl – all products of Cincinnati Public Schools.

On January 15, 2019, Smitherman's wife, Pamela M.T. Smitherman, died after a two-year battle with breast cancer and an autoimmune disease. Pamela Smitherman was an educator at Cincinnati Public Schools and was survived by her husband and five children.

== Political career ==
=== Cincinnati City Council ===
==== 2003 – 2005 ====
2003 Cincinnati City Council Election Results

Winning Candidates

- David Pepper (D): 34,405
- Alicia Reece (D): 32,078
- Y. Laketa Cole (D): 27,644
- James R. Tarbell (C): 27,480
- John Cranley (D): 26,980
- R. Patrick DeWine (R): 26,573
- Christopher Smitherman (C/G): 25,483
- Sam Malone (R): 24,002
- David Crowley (D): 22,713

Losing Candidates

- Damon Lynch III (I): 21,764
- Leslie Ghiz (R): 19,916
- Chris Monzel (R): 19,197
- Barbara W. Trauth: 17,480
- John Connelly: 14,047
- Pete Witte: 13,479
- Terry Deters: 11,889
- John F. Schlagetter (C): 11,420
- Tom Jones: 10,441
- Samuel T. Britton: 9,778
- Howard H. Bond: 8,260
- Nick Spencer (C): 7,378
- Marilyn Hyland: 5,864
- Brian Garry (G): 5,504
- Eric Wilson: 2,686
- Glenn O. Givens Sr.: 2,327
- Larry J. Frazier: 2,323

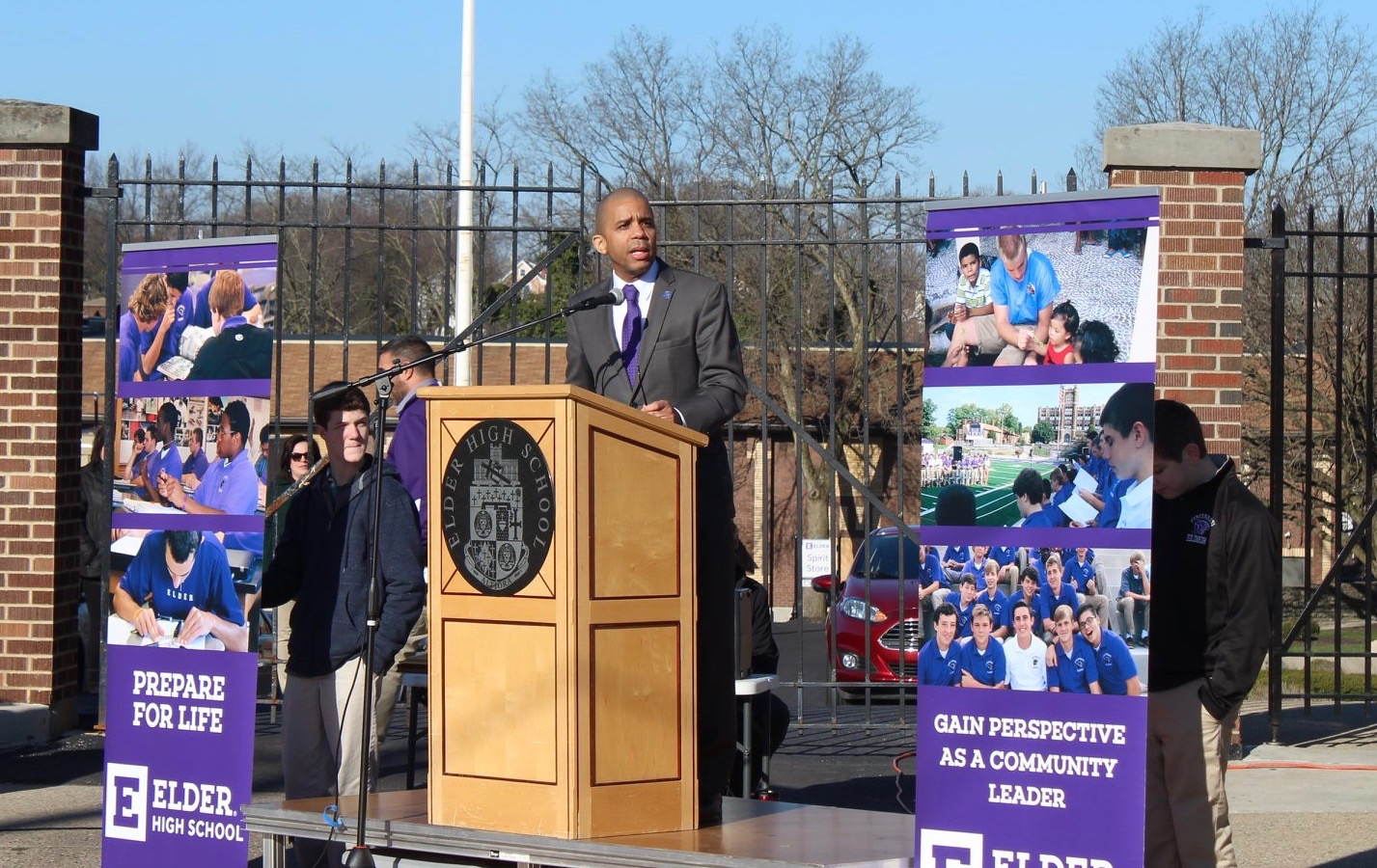
Smitherman speaking at Elder High School in March 2018

Smitherman was elected to Cincinnati City Council on November 4, 2003, as a member of the Charter Committee. Smitherman ran on a platform of fiscal responsibility, racial reconciliation, improved community-police relations, and improved transportation and employment opportunities. During his first term on council, Smitherman served as the vice-chair of the Arts & Culture Committee. He also served on the Law and Public Safety Committee, Neighborhood and Public Services Committee, the Community Development Committee, and the Education & Intergovernmental Affairs Committee. During his term, Smitherman focused on neighborhood improvements including authoring a motion to allow part of drug-related dollars seized by police to be returned to the affected community. He introduced motions to pioneer regional economic cooperation via Joint Economic Development Districts (JEDD) and Cooperative Economic Development Agreements (CEDA). Smitherman worked to firm up the city's working capital fund and also played a leading role in ending Fire Department brownouts. Smitherman did not win reelection in 2005.

==== 2011 – 2013 ====
2011 Cincinnati City Council Election Results

Winning Candidates

- Roxanne Qualls (C, D): 37,275
- P.G. Sittenfeld (D): 30,474
- Wendell Young (D): 29,067
- Cecil Thomas (D): 28,892
- Charlie Winburn (R): 28,829
- Laure Quinlivan (D): 27,422
- Yvette Simpson (C, D): 27,204
- Christopher Smitherman (I): 23,760
- Chris Seelbach (D): 23,484

Losing Candidates

- Chris Bortz (C): 22,044
- Kevin Flynn (C): 21,828
- Amy Murray (R): 21,433
- Leslie Ghiz (R): 20,719
- Wayne Lippert (R): 18,397
- Jason Riveiro (D): 18,174
- Mike Allen (I) 16,598
- Nicholas Hollan (D): 14,628
- Catherine Smith Mills (R): 13,513
- Pat McCollum (I): 6,180
- Kathy Atkinson (I): 5,012
- Jacqueline Allen (I): 4,555
- Sandra Queen Noble (I): 2,726
- Orlando Welborn (I): 33

On November 8, 2011, Smitherman was elected for a second time to Cincinnati City Council after receiving 23,760 votes in the at-large general election. Smitherman ran as an Independent politician whose platform was a balanced budget, proper funding for police and fire, and fixing the city's pension. Smitherman was sworn in for a two-year term on December 1, 2011.

==== 2013 – 2017 ====
2013 Cincinnati City Council Election Results

Winning Candidates

- P.G. Sittenfeld (D): 37,484
- Charlie Windburn (R): 27,397
- David Mann (C, D): 26,443
- Yvette Simpson (C, D): 25,449
- Chris Seelbach (D): 23,738
- Christopher Smitherman (I) 23,604
- Wendell Young (D): 22,600
- Kevin Flynn (C): 22,059
- Amy Murray (C, R): 21,979

Losing Candidates

- Laure Quinlivan (D): 21,079
- Greg Landsman (C, D): 19,619
- Michelle Dillingham (D): 19,143
- Pam Thomas (D): 18,499
- Vanessa White (C): 16,892
- Sam Malone (R): 16,462
- Mellisa Wegman (R): 9,942
- Shawn Butler (D): 9,788
- Mike Moroski (I): 8,688
- Angela Beamon (I): 7,943
- Kevin Johnson (I): 6,647
- Timothy Joseph Dorsbrusch (I): 4,006

On November 5, 2013, Smitherman was reelected to Cincinnati City Council with 24,125 votes. Having run as an independent, Smitherman did not receive the endorsement of any major party. He ran on a platform of balancing the budget, delivering basic services, and solving the Cincinnati Pension crisis. During this same election, John Cranley defeated incumbent Vice Mayor Roxanne Qualls to become the Mayor of Cincinnati. Cranley appointed Smitherman as the Chair of the Law and Public Safety Committee, giving him jurisdiction to oversee all city issues related to Police; Fire; Safety Policies; Citizen Complaint Authority; Liquor Licenses; and Public Services. During this term, Smitherman also sat on the Budget and Finance Committee, Economic Growth and Zoning Committee, and the Neighborhoods Committee. Smitherman was sworn in for a four-year term on December 1, 2013.

==== 2018 – Present ====
2017 Cincinnati City Council Election Results

Winning Candidates

- P.G. Sittenfeld (D): 39,815
- David Mann (C, D): 35,789
- Chris Seelbach (D): 30,626
- Wendell Young (D): 28,295
- Christopher Smitherman (I) 27,149
- Tamaya Dennard (C, D): 26,053
- Greg Landsman (D): 25,049
- Amy Murray (C, R): 23,888
- Jeff Pastor (R): 21,996

Losing Candidates

- Michelle Dillingham (D): 21,773
- Ozie Davis (D): 18,671
- Lesley Jones (D): 18,345
- Laure Quinlivan (I): 16,758
- Derek Bauman (C): 16,680
- Henry Frondorf (C): 10,637
- Seth Maney (R): 10,114
- Brian Garry (G): 9,152
- Kelli Prather (I): 7,175
- Tamie Sullivan (G): 6,232
- Tonya Dumas (I): 6,186
- Erica L. Black-Johnson (I): 5,539
- Cristina Burcica (I): 4,150
- Manuel Foggie (I): 3,556
- Dadrien Washington (I): 125

Smitherman at the Little Village stay-and-play center grand opening.

On November 7, 2017, Smitherman was re-elected with 27,149 votes. On December 13, 2017, Mayor John Cranley, having just defeated incumbent City Councilwoman and Mayoral challenger Yvette Simpson, appointed Christopher Smitherman to serve as the Vice Mayor replacing then Vice Mayor David Mann. Cranley also appointed Smitherman to serve on the Cincinnati Planning Commission starting on January 2, 2018. Smitherman was sworn in as a member of the Cincinnati City Council and as the Cincinnati Vice Mayor on January 2, 2018. Smitherman continued to serve as Chair of the Law and Public Safety Committee. He was also a member of the Economic Growth and Zoning Committee and the Neighborhoods Committee. In early 2019, Smitherman submitted his resignation from the Budget and Finance Committee – citing time constraints. Smitherman was term-limited and his tenure on Cincinnati City Council ended in January 2022.

===== Two Year City Council Terms =====
In the wake of five democratic members of Cincinnati City Council, P.G. Sittenfeld, Chris Seelbach, Wendell Young, Tamaya Dennard, and Greg Landsman, being caught in an open meeting law(s) violation(s) scandal, Smitherman announced in May 2018, that he was launching a ballot initiative to place a charter amendment on the November Ballot to revert Cincinnati City Council terms to 2 years. This issue, which later became known as "Issue 10," was later placed on the ballot by a council vote. On November 6, 2018, Cincinnati voters approved "Issue 10" by a margin of 70.09% (71,461) in favor and 29.91% (30,502) opposed. The amendment took effect in 2021, following the next council election.

===== Marijuana Decriminalization =====
In May 2019, Christopher Smitherman and Councilman Jeff Pastor sponsored an ordinance that would decriminalize the possession of marijuana under 100 grams in the City of Cincinnati. After failing to pass suspension, Smitherman vowed to begin a petition drive to put the issue on the ballot if the ordinance ultimately failed. On June 12, 2019, Cincinnati City Council voted 5–3 to pass the ordinance.

=== Vice Mayor of Cincinnati ===
Smitherman was re-elected to Cincinnati City Council on November 7, 2017. Following the election, on December 13, 2017, Cincinnati mayor John Cranley appointed Christopher Smitherman to serve as the vice mayor of Cincinnati – replacing former vice mayor David S. Mann. Smitherman took the oath of vice mayor on January 2, 2018, during the city council and mayoral inaugural ceremony. The role of the vice mayor is to act and preside over the city council in the absence of the mayor. Smitherman's term as vice mayor ended in January 2022.

=== President of the Cincinnati NAACP ===
On March 27, 2007, Smitherman was elected president of the Cincinnati Chapter of the National Association for the Advancement of Colored People (NAACP) after a highly contested election with incumbent Edith Thrower. During his term the chapter's membership increased 600% from 500 to 3,000 members and the chapter's debt was eliminated. In June 2013, Smitherman temporarily stepped down as president during his reelection campaign for Cincinnati City Council. James Clingman, a vice president of the NAACP and founder of the Greater Cincinnati African-American Chamber of Commerce, served as interim president. Smitherman won reelection to council in November 2013 and tendered his resignation as president of the Cincinnati NAACP effective January 1, 2014.

During Smitherman's time as president, the Cincinnati NAACP co-authored and co-sponsored five ballot initiatives, three of which were successful. Those initiatives that passed included defeating a county jail tax, stopping red-light cameras, and allowing voters to ratify the sale of Greater Cincinnati Water Works. Smitherman fell short in his attempt to institute proportional representation on city council and to pass Issue 9, the anti-street car rail initiative. In order to place these initiatives on the ballot, Smitherman helped collect more than 100,000 signatures.

==== Hamilton County jail tax ====
In 2007, the Cincinnati NAACP partnered with various bipartisan activist groups throughout Cincinnati and Hamilton County, Ohio to oppose a proposed tax increase to fund a massive jail development in Cincinnati. The sales tax increase included a 0.5 percent for eight years and 0.25 percent for an additional seven years. The tax would pay for a $198 million, 1,800 bed adult detention facility, $11 million juvenile detention facility expansion of 50 beds, a $2 million Hamilton County Justice Center remodeling and other programs that altogether totaled $736 million over 15 years. In order to place this initiative on the November ballot, 28,750 signatures were needed. The Hamilton County Board of Elections confirmed 38,961 valid signatures were obtained. On November 6, 2007, Hamilton County voters of rejected the sales tax increase by more than a 12% margin.

==== Red light cameras ====
In 2008, the Cincinnati NAACP, along with other activist groups, collected over 10,000 signatures to put the use of red light cameras to the voters. The ballot initiative would allow the voters to decide on an amendment to the city charter prohibiting local officials from ever installing either red light cameras or speed cameras. In November 2008, a majority of Cincinnati voters approved the amendment to the city charter prohibiting the use of red light cameras.
