= Stephanie Summerow Dumas =

American politician

Hamilton County Commissioner
- Incumbent
- Assumed office January 3, 2019 Serving with Denise Driehaus and Alicia Reece
- Preceded by: Chris Monzel

Mayor of Forest Park
- In office January 1, 1999 – December 31, 2005

Vice Mayor of Forest Park
- In office January 1, 1993 – December 31, 1999

Village Manager
- In office January 5, 2011 – December 31, 2015

Personal details
- Born: May 6, 1955 (age 71) Cincinnati, Ohio, U.S.
- Party: Democratic
- Education: University of Cincinnati
- Occupation: Politician

Stephanie Summerow Dumas (born May 6, 1955) is a Democratic politician, currently serving as a Commissioner of Hamilton County, Ohio. She is the first African American woman elected to the position of County Commissioner in Ohio history. She previously has served as both vice-mayor (1993-1999) and mayor (1999-2005) of Forest Park, Ohio. She also served as the Village Manager of Lincoln Heights, Ohio (2011-2015).

In 2018, Summerow Dumas was elected as Hamilton County Commissioner, replacing her opponent Chris Monzel. Her term in office began January 3, 2019. She was re-elected in 2022 with 45.2% of the vote, defeating Republican Matthew Paul O'Neill and Independent candidate Christopher Smitherman.

In 2026, Summerow Dumas lost renomination in the Democratic primary for Hamilton County Commissioner to incumbent Cincinnati city council member Meeka D. Owens.

== Electoral history ==
2026 Hamilton County Commissioner Democratic Primary election
Party	Candidate	Votes	%
Democratic	Meeka Owens	33,234	51.93
Democratic	Stephanie Summerow-Dumas	26,258	41.03
Democratic	Herman Najoli	4,506	7.04

2022 Hamilton County Commissioner election
Party	Candidate	Votes	%
Democratic	Stephanie Summerow-Dumas	135,349	45.2
Republican	Matthew Paul O'Neill	95,076	31.8
Independent	Christopher Smitherman	68,903	23.0

2018 Hamilton County Commissioner election
Party	Candidate	Votes	%
Democratic	Stephanie Summerow-Dumas	173,408	51.8
Republican	Chris Monzel	161,198	48.2
