= Sam Malone (disambiguation) =

Sam Malone is a Cheers character.

Sam Malone may also refer to:

- Sam Malone (politician) (born 1970), Cincinnati city councilmember tried for domestic violence
- Samantha "Sam" Malone, a Fahrenheit character

== See also ==
- Malone (surname)
- Sam Maloney (disambiguation)
- Sammy Malone, a Casualty character played by Finn Atkins
