= Chris Seelbach (politician) =

American politician

Member of the Cincinnati City Council
- In office December 1, 2011 – January 4, 2022

Personal details
- Born: Christopher Steven Seelbach; November 14, 1979 (age 46) Louisville, Kentucky, U.S.
- Party: Democratic
- Spouse: Craig Schultz (m. 2018)
- Education: St. Xavier High School; Xavier University; University of Dayton School of Law
- Committees: Budget and Finance (2011–present); Human Services, Youth & Arts (2013–present); Education & Entrepreneurship (2013–present); Strategic Growth (Vice-Chair) (2011–2013); Livable Communities (2011–2013); Public Safety (2011–2013); Rules and Government Operations (2011–2013)
- Website: SeelbachforCouncil.com

Christopher Steven Seelbach (born November 14, 1979) is an American politician. He made history in 2011 when he became the first openly LGBTQ+ person elected to the Cincinnati City Council. On May 20, 2013, the White House named Seelbach a national Harvey Milk "Champion of Change" for his commitment to equality and public service.

== College and early career ==
Seelbach was born in Louisville, Kentucky. He moved to Cincinnati in 1998. After founding the first gay-straight alliance at Xavier University, he graduated from the university with a degree in business administration and attended law school at the University of Dayton. While in law school, he worked on the council staff of Vice-Mayor David Crowley, with whom he became friends, and was employed by Crowley's 2005 re-election campaign. Seelbach also became involved in the campaign to repeal Article 12, a law which forbade the city council from passing any protections for gay men and lesbians, which was repealed in 2004. In 2014, Seelbach completed Harvard University's John F. Kennedy School of Government program for Senior Executives in State and Local Government as a David Bohnett LGBTQ Victory Institute Leadership Fellow.

== Cincinnati City Council ==
Seelbach was elected to the Cincinnati City Council in 2011. There are a total of 9 Cincinnati City Council members and all are at-large, representing the entire city. His campaign for the city council was backed financially by the Victory Fund.

Seelbach has previously served as Vice President and Chief Financial Officer of a small marketing/consulting business, the Seidewitz Group.

On August 2, 2012, Seelbach was announced to be one of the winners of the Cincinnati Business Courier's 2012 Forty under 40 winners. Seelbach was also recognized in the Venue Magazine Fall 2012 edition as one of the "Great Leaders under 40."

=== Gang of Five ===
In 2018, Seelbach was caught participating in the "Gang of Five" a group of five city council members (Seelbach, P.G. Sittenfeld, Greg Landsman, Wendell Young, and Tamaya Dennard) who met via secret text messages. They attempted to undermine the elected mayor and bypass public meetings and debates.

In March 2019, the Gang of Five agreed to turn over their text messages in order to settle a lawsuit filed by a local anti-tax activist. Among the text messages were juvenile discussions of city employees' sexuality, messages mocking members of the public who attended council meetings or contacted the city council. The text messages were made searchable and posted on the website of the law firm that brought the suit against the Gang of Five.

In June 2019 additional text messages were released as a result of a lawsuit filed by Sinclair Media reporter Angenette Levy in which it was revealed that Seelbach and P.G. Sittenfeld strategized to highlight and capitalize on racial tensions to protect the then city Manager (Harry Black). This release also included text messages in which Seelbach discussed promises he extracted from Black in exchange for Seelbach's support, and Seelbach and other council members discussing Black's habit of making late night drunken phone calls to city officials and reporters. Text messages also revealed that Black had engaged in efforts to suppress dissent among city employees, including chastising a city employee after she testified before council about the death of a teenager when 911 operators and Cincinnati police were unable to locate the teen. Despite all these concerns, Seelbach opposed efforts to fire Black.

The Gang of Five's efforts cost the City approximately $500,000 as it resulted in additional costs to fire a city manager, and costs to hire outside lawyers to defend the lawsuit and ultimately in paying the fines and attorney fees as part of the agreed order resolving the lawsuit. Another lawsuit for additional records is pending before the Ohio Supreme Court, State ex rel. Cincinnati Enquirer v. Cincinnati, Ohio Supreme Court Case No. 2019-0599.

== Election history ==
Italic type indicates incumbent.

Year	Winning candidates	Losing candidates
2013	P.G. Sittenfeld (D): 37,484; Charlie Winburn (R): 27,397; David S. Mann (C, D): 26,443; Yvette Simpson (C, D): 25,449; Chris Seelbach (D): 23,738; Christopher Smitherman (I) 23,604; Wendell Young (D): 22,600; Kevin Flynn (C): 22,059; Amy Murray (C, R): 21,979	Laure Quinlivan (D): 21,079; Greg Landsman (C, D): 19,619; Michelle Dillingham (D): 19,143; Pam Thomas (D): 18,499; Vanessa White (C): 16,892; Sam Malone (R): 16,462; Melissa Wegman (R): 9,942; Shawn Butler (D): 9,788; Mike Moroski (I): 8,688; Angela Beamon (I): 7,943; Kevin Johnson (I): 6,647; Timothy Joseph Dorsbrusch (I): 4,006
2011	Roxanne Qualls (C, D): 37,275; P.G. Sittenfeld (D): 30,474; Wendell Young (D): 29,067; Cecil Thomas (D): 28,892; Charlie Winburn (R): 28,829; Laure Qunlivan (D): 27,422; Yvette Simpson (C, D): 27,204; Christopher Smitherman (I): 23,760; Chris Seelbach (D): 23,484	Chris Bortz (C): 22,044; Kevin Flynn (C): 21,828; Amy Murray (R): 21,433; Leslie Ghiz (R): 20,719; Wayne Lippert (R): 18,397; Jason Riveiro (D): 18,174; Mike Allen (I) 16,598; Nicholas Hollan (D): 14,628; Catherine Smith Mills (R): 13,513; Pat McCollum (I): 6,180; Kathy Atkinson (I): 5,012; Jacqueline Allen (I): 4,555; Sandra Queen Noble (I): 2,726; Orlando Welborn (I): 33
