= Bobbie L. Sterne =

American politician (1919–2017)

Bobbie Sterne

Mayor of Cincinnati
- In office 1978–1979
- Preceded by: Jerry Springer
- Succeeded by: Ken Blackwell
- In office 1975 – 1976
- Preceded by: Ted Berry
- Succeeded by: Jim Luken

Member of the Cincinnati City Council
- In office 1971–1998

Personal details
- Born: November 27, 1919 Moran, Ohio, U.S.
- Died: November 22, 2017 (aged 97) Santa Cruz, California, U.S.
- Party: Charter
- Children: 2
- Education: Akron City School of Nursing

Bobbie L. Sterne (November 27, 1919 – November 22, 2017) was an American politician who served two terms as the Mayor of Cincinnati, from 1975–1976 and 1978–1979.

== Early life and education ==
Sterne was born on November 27, 1919, in Moran, Ohio, and grew up in Portage County, Ohio. She earned a nursing degree from the Akron City School of Nursing. During World War II, Sterne was a member of the 25th General Hospital Division and served in England, France, and Belgium. After the war, Sterne settled in North Avondale, Cincinnati with her husband.

== Career ==
Sterne was elected to the Cincinnati City Council in 1971 and served continuously until 1998 with the exception of a two-year hiatus.

A member of the Charter Party, she was Cincinnati's second female mayor, after Dorothy N. Dolbey. She has previously served as a long-time member of the Cincinnati City Council. She retired from the council in 1998 and was succeeded by Jim Tarbell.

== Personal life ==
Sterne and her husband, Dr. Eugene Sterne, had two children before Eugene's death in 1977. Bobbie died on November 22, 2017, in Santa Cruz, California, aged 97.

Political offices
| Preceded by Ted Berry | Mayor of Cincinnati, Ohio; 1975–1976 | Succeeded by Jim Luken |
| Preceded by Jerry Springer | Mayor of Cincinnati, Ohio; 1978–1979 | Succeeded by Ken Blackwell |
