= Arnold's Bar and Grill =

Restaurant in Cincinnati, Ohio, US, founded 1861

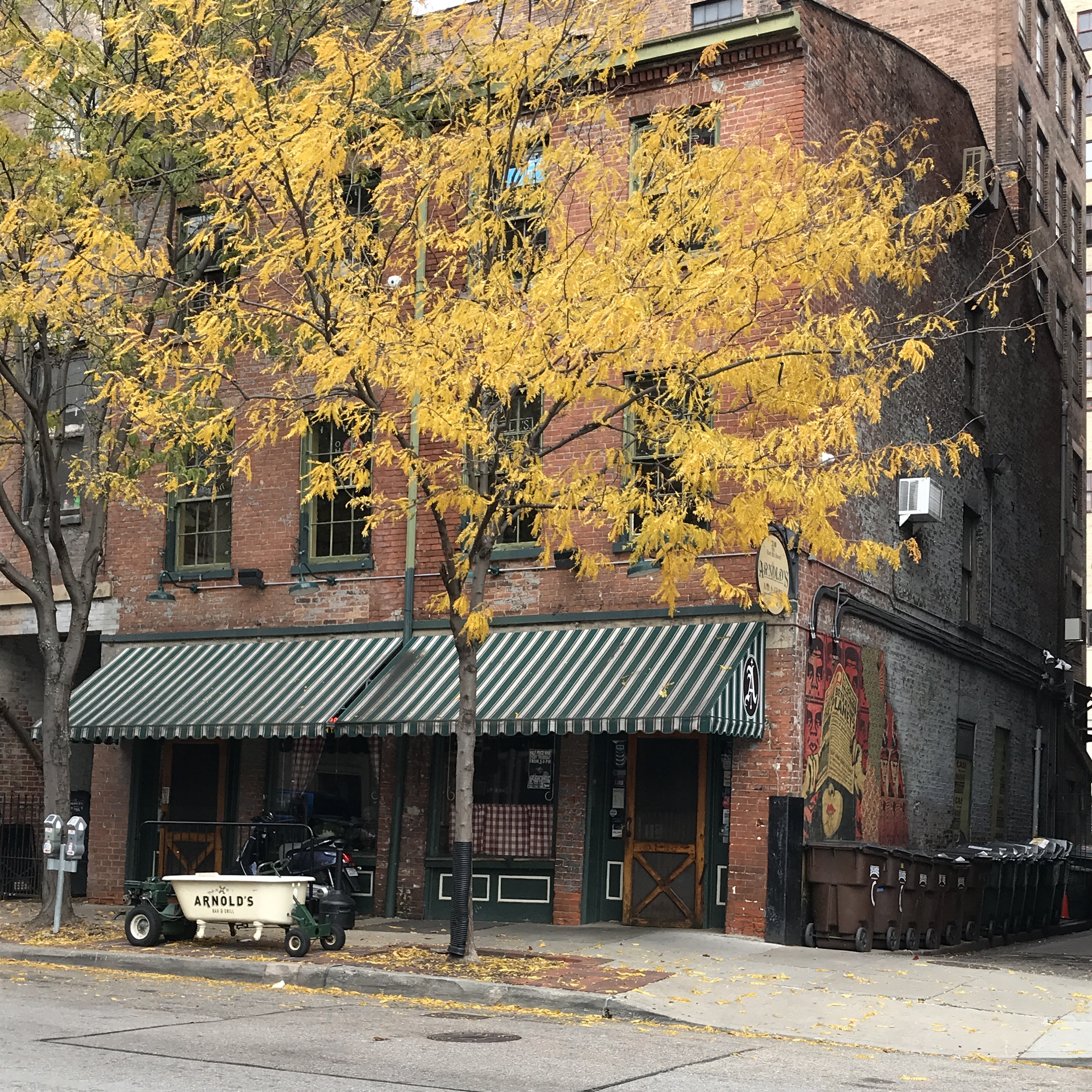
- Exterior of Arnold's Bar & Grill
- Interactive map of Arnold's Bar and Grill

Restaurant information
- Established: 1861; 165 years ago
- Owners: Chris and Bethany Breeden
- Previous owners: Susan Fawcett, Simon Arnold, Hugo Arnold, Elmer Arnold, Jim Christakos & George Christos, Alex Chaldekas, Jim Tarbell, Ronda Breeden
- Chef: Korry Wolfgang
- Food type: American
- Dress code: Casual
- Rating: 4.6 Stars (Google)
- Location: 210 E 8th St, Cincinnati, Hamilton, Ohio, 45202, US
- Coordinates: 39°06′19″N 84°30′36″W
- Website: arnoldsbarandgrill.com

Arnold's Bar and Grill is the oldest continuously operating bar in Cincinnati, Ohio, and one of the oldest in the United States.

== History ==
Arnold's is the oldest continuously operating bar in the city and one of the oldest in the country.

The establishment was first opened in 1838 by Susan Fawcett as "a whorehouse," according to Cincinnati historian Mike Morgan. In 1861, new owner Simon Arnold operated it as a bar and lived upstairs. Around the year 1900, Simon Arnold's son Hugo took it over; he and his wife and six children also lived upstairs. Hugo Arnold added the building next door, which according to Cincinnati food historian Polly Campbell "allowed for a separate entrance and room for women." In the 1920s, Hugo Arnold's son Elmer Arnold took it over and, because of prohibition, started serving food. According to Campbell, Elmer Arnold was also "likely selling homemade gin". The Arnold family operated the bar through 98 years and three generations until 1959, when Elmer Arnold sold it to former professional wrestler and mob collector Jim Christakos, who also lived upstairs, and his brother George Christos.

In 1976, Cincinnati City Council member Jim Tarbell purchased it from Christakos (or possibly from an interim owner, Alex Chaldekas) and also moved in upstairs. He expanded the bar to include a large outdoor courtyard. In 1998 longtime Arnold's server Ronda Breeden bought it to run with her son Chris Breeden. In 2019 Chris and Bethany Breeden took over ownership.

During prohibition the bar operated as a speakeasy. Some believe the building to be haunted.

The bathtub cart which fronts the building and is used in local parades refers to the second-floor bathtub which is reputed to have been used to make bathtub gin during prohibition. According to Campbell, the gin was likely made in the bathtub "because it was easy to pull the plug in case there was a raid."

In 2019 Arnold's partnered with local distillers Woodstone Creek to produce Hugo Arnold's Bathtub Gin, named for the prohibition-era owner of the bar.

In 2017 Arnold's allowed Cornerstone Paranormal to investigate staff and patron claims of paranormal activity on the property. Several odd and interesting findings were documented.

== Reception ==
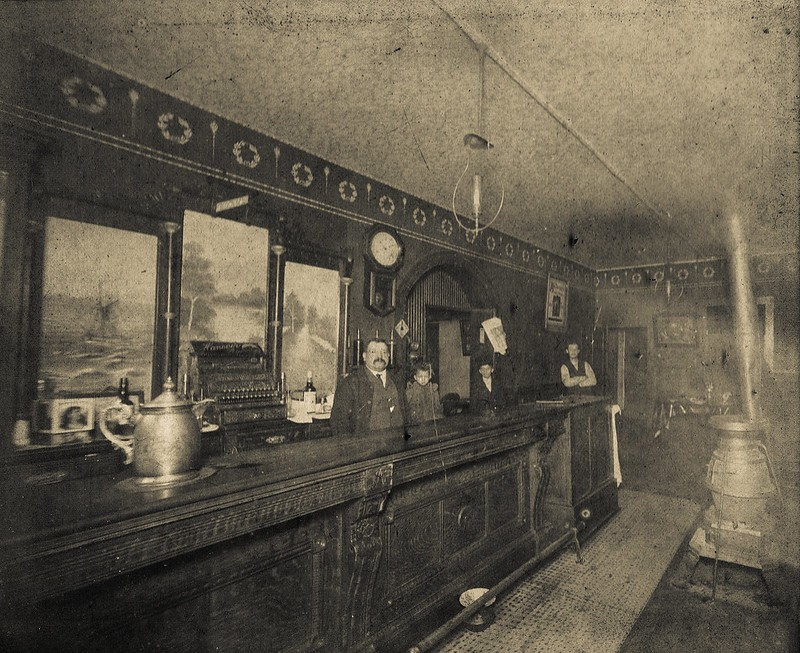
Bar area pre-1900

One of America's oldest bars, Arnold's is frequently named to national, state, and local lists. Esquire named it to their list of best bars in the country. Thrillist called it the "most iconic bar in Ohio" and named it to their list of best bars in the country. The Daily Meal named it one of the best bars in the country. Serious Eats named it to their list of 10 restaurants and bars to visit in Cincinnati. In 2023 Ohio Magazine listed Arnold's as one of its 30 famous Ohio food spots.

Esquire's beverage historian David Wondrich stated that "if Arnold's were in New York, San Francisco, Chicago, or Boston – somewhere, in short, that people actually visit – it would be world-famous."

In their 2021 "Best of the City" issue Cincinnati Magazine states, "the legends of bathtub gin, paranormal activity, and mob connections are just a small part of why the city's oldest—and perhaps most beloved—bar still draws a mighty crowd. Cincinnati Enquirer food critic Keith Pandolfi describes Arnold's as "part of the soul of Cincinnati".

== Street art ==
In 2010 Shepard Fairey installed a 15-foot-tall by 20-foot-wide mural entitled "Global Warning" on Arnold's exterior wall. Fairey installed the mural as part of his show "Supply and Demand" at the Contemporary Arts Center that year. The mural is made from wheatpasted screen prints, which the bar has maintained.

In 2013 street artist JR installed a wheatpaste mural in Arnold's courtyard. The mural depicts Arnold's waitresses from the 1930s. JR installed the piece as part of his "Unframed" series, an ongoing project that began in 2010 using images by famous or anonymous photographers and archival images taken out of their context. JR has exhibited Unframed works in Cincinnati, Marseille, Atlanta, Washington DC, Baden Baden, Grottaglie, Vevey, and São Paulo.

In 2015 the artist Hargo (also known as Cash For Your Warhol) installed a mural on Arnold's exterior alley wall. Hargo installed the mural as part of his show "Cash For Your Warhol: Fund Your Startup!" being held at The BLDG in Covington, Kentucky.

In 2020 street artist Vhils installed a carved bas-relief mural portraying "Peanut Jim" Shelton in the courtyard.

In 2022 street artist and graphic designer, L'Amour Supreme installed a spray painted mural on Arnold's exterior alley wall depicting his Czarface character. The mural was installed while he was in Cincinnati doing a much larger mural for the Blink light festival.

== In popular culture ==
=== On television ===
In a 2018 Season 7 episode 12 of the Travel Channel's Man v. Food, host Casey Webb visits Arnold's during the episode's trip to Cincinnati.

Arnold's was featured on Season 3 Episode 1 of First We Feast's Hot Ones with host Sean Evans and guest Padma Lakshmi from Top Chef.

Producers for the NBC drama Harry's Law included the bar as a set on the show. They built a replica set of Arnold's as a hangout for the characters on the show. Even borrowing actual staff uniforms, table tents and copies of artwork to be used on the show. When the show was ultimately canceled, they sent actual set pieces to Arnold's which are displayed on the second floor of the bar.

Arnold's Bar and Grill's executive Chef, Kayla Robison appeared on Food Network's Guy's Grocery Games in 2019. Robison won the episode and was awarded the $20,000 prize without having to compete in the final. In March 2022 Robison won an episode of Chopped.

=== In film ===
The 2015 film Carol, directed by Todd Haynes and nominated for 6 Academy Awards, was partially filmed at Arnold's. Cate Blanchett, Rooney Mara, Sarah Paulson and Jake Lacy were featured in scenes filmed at Arnold's.

The 2016 film Marauders, directed by Steven C. Miller, transformed Arnold's courtyard into a Mexican Cantina for filming. Scenes starring Christopher Meloni, Bruce Willis, and Adrian Grenier were filmed there.

Portions of the 2024 film Shirley, starring Regina King as Shirley Chisholm, were filmed at Arnold's.

In January 2023, Arnold's closed for six weeks to be used for the filming of The Alto Knights, a gangster film starring Robert De Niro.

== Awards and accolades ==
- 2023 Ohio Magazine's 30 Famous Ohio Food Spots
- 2018 The Daily Meal 150 Best Bars in America
- 2015 Thrillist "Most Iconic Bar in Ohio"
- 2013 Esquire Magazine "Best Bars in America"

Cincinnati magazine named Arnold's Cincinnati Dancing Pig burger one of the best in the city.
