= Charter Committee =

Political organization in Cincinnati, Ohio, U.S.

The Charter Committee
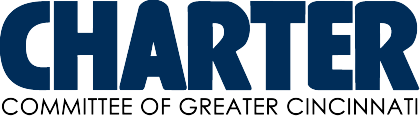
- Leader: Darrick Dansby
- Founded: June 6, 1924
- Headquarters: Cincinnati, Ohio
- Ideology: Progressivism

Website
- chartercommittee.org

The Charter Committee (also known as the Charter Party) is an independent political organization dedicated to good government in Cincinnati, Ohio. Members of this committee are called Charterites. Committee organizers prefer the term Charter Committee rather than Charter Party. Because of Ohio State laws regarding vote percentage cutoffs for official party recognition, the Charter Committee is not an officially recognized political party in Ohio.

== History ==
The Charter Committee claims to be "the oldest third party in the nation that has continually elected officials to the office". It was founded in 1924, during a time when Cincinnati government was under the control of the Republican Party. Cincinnati was infamous for being the most corruptly governed major city in the United States, the era of Boss Cox (established by George Cox in the 1880s), controlled then by his protégé Rudolph Hynicka, who spent most of his time in New York in the management of the Columbia Burlesque Circuit.

Republican reformers, led by members of the Republican Executive and Advisory Committee, then began the Cincinnatus Association. In 1923, Republican lawyer Murray Seasongood became the leader of the reformers' successful anti-tax campaign.

The Cincinnatus Association then led to the formation of the Birdless Ballot League, which advocated nonpartisan elections. (The term "birdless" referred to the use of the Republican eagle and Democratic rooster as party symbols on the ballot). In 1924, the Birdless Ballot League joined with other reformers to create the City Charter Committee.

The pre-1925 charter established a 32-member city council, six of whom were elected at-large. Only candidates nominated in a citywide primary by the Republican and Democratic parties were eligible to run. In 1924, there were 31 Republicans and one Democrat on the council. Between 1913 and 1925, only five Democrats had managed to get elected to the council. The real power behind government was held by Hynicka's Republican Central Committee, comprising Republican ward and township captains, which held the real power in the Republican party, to the disadvantage of the Executive and Advisory Committee.

The new municipal charter enacted in 1925 as part of the Charterite movement established a Council-Manager form of government (abolishing the mayor-council system) and a civil service bureaucracy to replace political patronage. The new charter, which created a nine-member council, also mandated nonpartisan municipal elections and proportional representation with preference-ranked voting.

With Democrats running on the Charter ticket, the first election following the adoption of the council resulted in the election of six Charterites to the council. Democrat Ed Dixon, who had won more votes than Seasongood, and, therefore, should automatically have become mayor under the new charter, was persuaded to allow the leader of the reform movement to become the first mayor under the new charter.

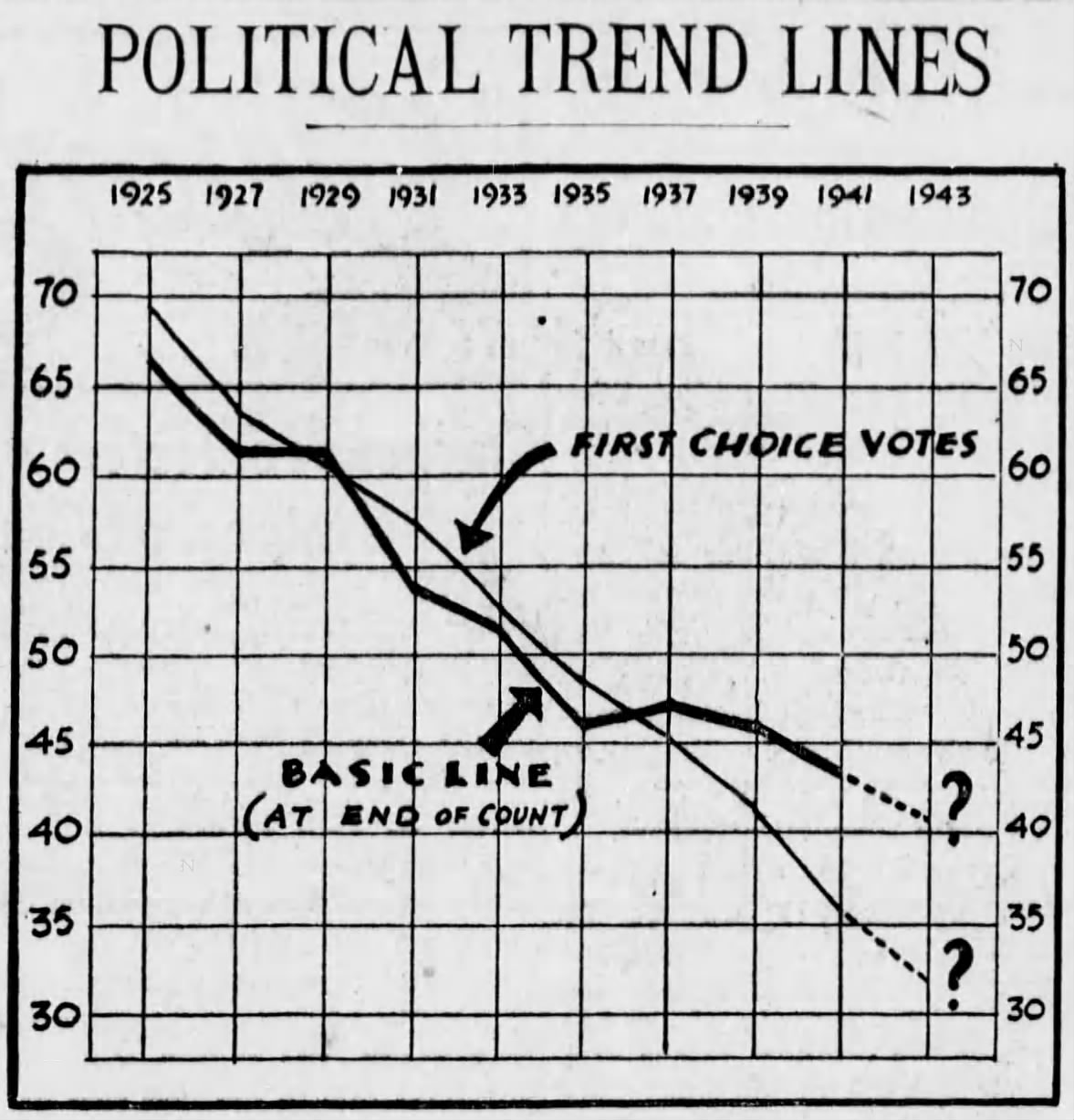
Cincinnati Charter-Republican Party electoral performance trend lines

Although the Charter movement started with Republican reformers like Seasongood, the movement quickly became informally allied with the Democratic party against the Republican machine. Democratic candidates ran as Charterites. By the 1950s, Republicans fought the Charterites by plastering them with the label of socialism. In 1957, the Republicans overturned proportional representation. It is believed that this was done to prevent the election of Theodore M. Berry as the city's first black mayor. "Ted Berry: After the Revolt". Cincinnati Enquirer. February 14, 1988. p. 4.

In 1959, Democrats broke off from the Charterite coalition. Splitting the progressive vote with the Democrats throughout the 1960s, the Charterites barely survived the return of Republican rule, with Charles Phelps Taft II its only elected official by 1961. In 1963, Berry joined Taft on the council.

In 1969, the Charterites joined with the Democrats in a formal coalition that took control of city government in 1971. The coalition was led at times both by Charterites (Bobbie L. Sterne and Charles Phelps Taft II) and by Democrats (Tom Luken and Jerry Springer). From 1973, the two parties divided the two-year mayoral term into two one-year periods that alternated between them.

Tom Luken's son, Charlie Luken ended the Democratic-Charterite coalition in 1985 when Arn Bortz was the only Charterite left on the council. In 1983 Marian Spencer was the first African American female elected to Cincinnati City Council and served as Vice Mayor and as a member of the Charter Party for one term. Sterne, who lost her seat in 1985, made a comeback in 1987. Bortz left politics in 1988 to concentrate on business but was anointed as his successor the popular professional football player Reggie Williams. Williams stayed for only two years. When Charterite Tyrone Yates became a Democrat in preparation for running for the state legislature, Sterne found herself again the sole Charterite on the council. Term limits prevented Sterne from running again in 1999, so she resigned her seat in 1998 in favor of restaurateur Jim Tarbell.

Over the years, Charterites pursued several liberal and progressive causes, including reducing pollution and establishing cost-of-living wage increases for municipal employees. The Charterites instituted the now-common requirement of maintaining a public inventory of municipal property. Another Charterite initiative that has spread throughout the country requires private employers to inform employees of the risks of handling hazardous materials, known as a right-to-know law.

The Charter Committee reached its height of power in the 1950s when it ran city government with Democrats running on the Charter ticket. In the 1970s and 1980s, the Charter Committee formed a coalition municipal government with the Democrats. The coalition lasted until 1986. In recent years, the Charter Committee has sought to expand beyond the Cincinnati city limits, endorsing candidates in neighboring jurisdictions, such as Covington, Kentucky.

The Charter Committee includes Democrats as well as Republicans and independents. The Charter Committee advocates an activist government to address public problems and its main power base has been among the progressive-minded, educated, affluent senior citizens of Cincinnati. The committee is currently making efforts to appeal to younger voters. The committee has also turned its sights on establishing a regional government.

The last Charterite mayor of Cincinnati was Arn Bortz. The party was nearly extinguished in the 1990s. From 1993 to 2003, the city council had only one Charterite member. In 2015, there were three Charterite members of the city council, Yvette Simpson, Kevin Flynn, and Amy Murray.

As of August 15, 2021, the current president of the Charter Committee is Darrick Dansby. The previous president was Matt Woods.

It accepts both Democratic and Republican members on its volunteer board of directors.

== Platform ==
As of 2021, the committee website states three main pillars that comprise its platform: Return, Reform, and Renew.

== Notable Charterites ==
- Chris Bortz
- Courtis Fuller
- Roxanne Qualls
- Murray Seasongood
- Yvette Simpson
- Marian Spencer
- Nick Spencer
- Bobbie L. Sterne
- Charles Phelps Taft II
- Jim Tarbell
- Reggie Williams
- Russell Wilson

== Former Charterites ==
Many former Charterites switched to one of the major parties or to independent. They include:

- Ken Blackwell, the former Republican Ohio Secretary of State and unsuccessful Republican candidate for Governor of Ohio against Democrat Ted Strickland in 2006
- John J. Gilligan, who was elected Governor of Ohio as a Democrat in the 1970s.
- Christopher Smitherman, a Cincinnati City Council member was endorsed in 2003 by the Charter Committee. He lost reelection in 2005 and recently returned to the council in 2011 as an independent with no political party endorsements.
- Tyrone Yates, a Democratic member of the state legislature, was a Charterite member of the city council until 1993.
