= Sam Maloney =

Sam Maloney may refer to:

- Samantha Maloney, musician known as Sam Maloney
- Officer Sam Maloney, a fictional character of Radio Patrol (serial)

== See also ==
- Maloney (surname)
- Sam Malone (disambiguation)
