= Ted Berry =

American mayor (1905–2000)

Theodore Moody Berry
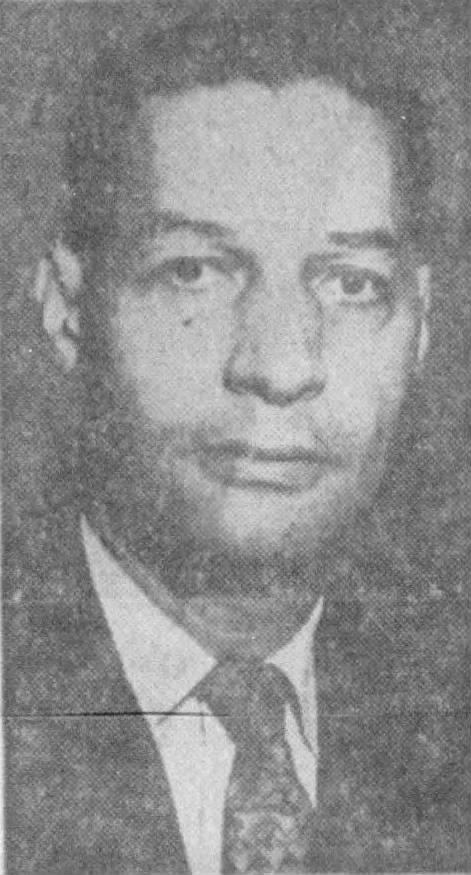
- Berry at work in the Office of Economic Opportunity c. 1965

Mayor of Cincinnati
- In office 1972–1975
- Preceded by: Tom Luken
- Succeeded by: Bobbie L. Sterne

Personal details
- Born: November 8, 1905 Maysville, Kentucky, U.S.
- Died: October 15, 2000 (aged 94) Cincinnati, Ohio, U.S.
- Spouse: Johnnie Mae Berry
- Education: University of Cincinnati; University of Cincinnati College of Law
- Occupation: Civil rights attorney Politician

Theodore Moody Berry (November 8, 1905 – October 15, 2000) was an American politician of the Charter Party of Cincinnati, Ohio and was the first African-American mayor of Cincinnati, Ohio.

== Early life and education ==
Born in poverty in Maysville, Kentucky, on November 8, 1905, Ted Berry overcame great obstacles to achieve personal success and gain a national reputation as a leader in the Civil Rights Movement. He graduated from Woodward High School in 1924 and served as class valedictorian, the first African American to hold that honor in Cincinnati. In his senior year, he won an essay contest with an entry submitted under the pseudonym Thomas Playfair after an all-white panel had rejected his initial entry. Berry worked at steel mills in Newport, Kentucky, to pay tuition at the University of Cincinnati and then at its law school.

== Legal career ==
Berry was admitted to the Ohio Bar in 1932. He served as president of the Cincinnati branch of the NAACP from 1932 to 1946. In 1938 he was appointed the first black assistant prosecuting attorney for Hamilton County.

=== Military service ===
During World War II, Berry worked in the Office of War Information as a morale officer. The job took him to Washington, D.C., and also caused him to change his political affiliation from Republican to Democrat. In 1945, Berry defended three black Army Air Force officers, members of the Tuskegee Airmen, who had protested a segregated officer's club in Indiana. He won acquittal for two of the men. In 1995, the Air Force pardoned the third who had been convicted.

=== NAACP service ===
From 1947 to 1961, Berry served on the NAACP Ohio Committee for Civil Rights Legislation where he worked on equal employment and fair housing issues. He was also involved with the Urban League of Greater Cincinnati.

=== Political career ===
He began his Cincinnati political career in 1947 when he ran for City Council. He lost that year but won in 1949. He was chairman of the finance committee in 1953 and led a controversial battle to create a city income tax. In 1955 he was elected vice mayor. His 1963 political campaign to return to Cincinnati's City Council was chaired by Rev. L. Venchael Booth. His creation of the Community Action Commission in Cincinnati caught the attention of Sargent Shriver. In 1965 President Lyndon Johnson appointed Berry to head the Office of Economic Opportunity's Community Action Programs that included Head Start, the Job Corps and Legal Services. Berry returned to Cincinnati in 1969 and was appointed to City Council in 1971. He was elected mayor in 1972 and served for four years—Cincinnati's first African-American mayor. In the 1980s and 1990s, Berry struggled to return proportional representation to Cincinnati because he firmly believed that it gave a fair share of power to Black voters.

== Death and legacy ==
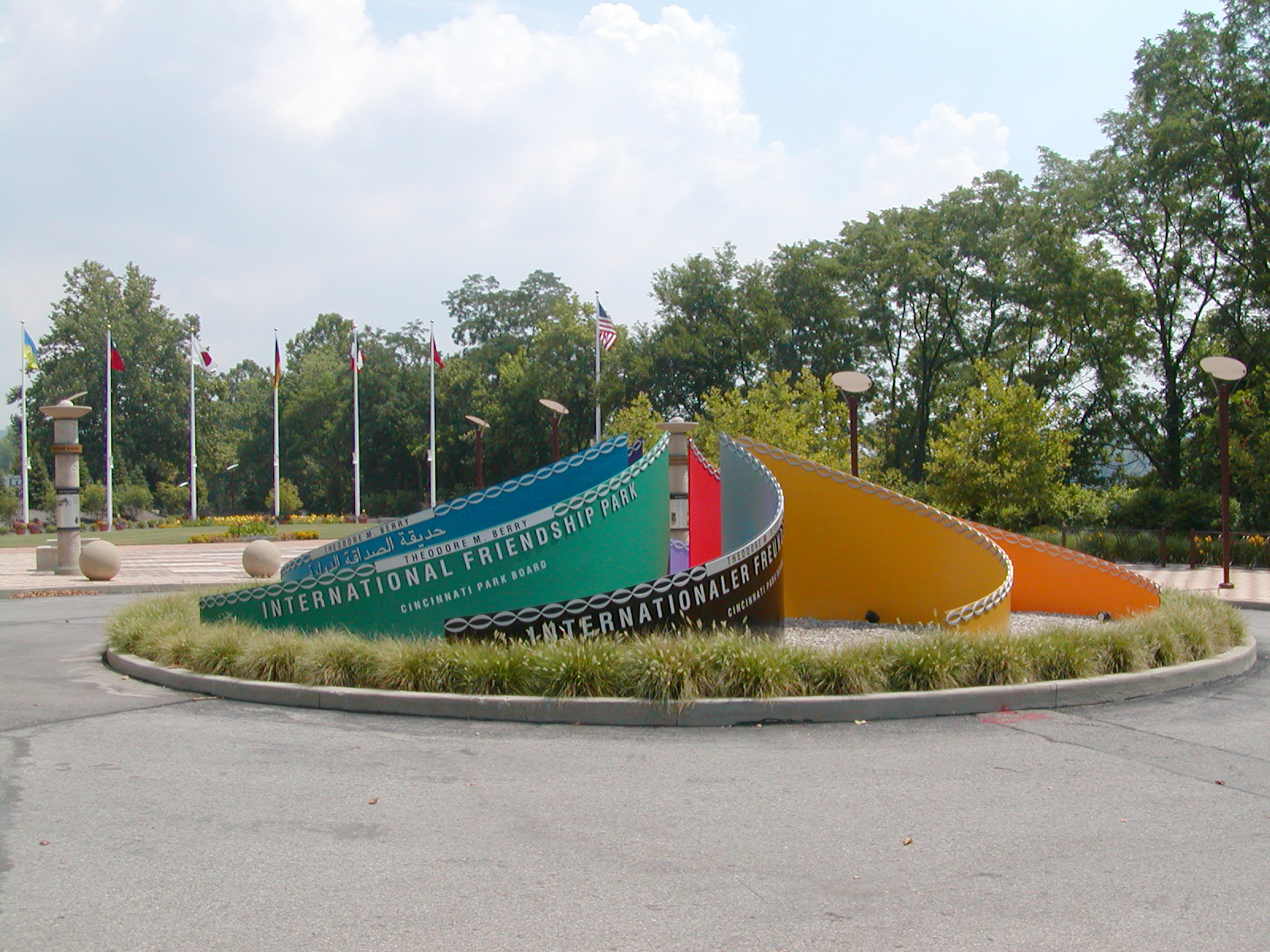
Ted Berry Park in Cincinnati, Ohio

Berry died at the age of 94 on October 15, 2000. Other prominent black Cincinnatians such as Marian Spencer and Judge Nathaniel R. Jones considered Ted Berry a role model. The city of Cincinnati has named both a street and a park after Berry.

== Associations and awards ==
Mayor Berry was a Prince Hall Freemason and a member of Alpha Phi Alpha fraternity, Alpha Alpha chapter. He was one of the founders that helped charter Alpha Rho Lambda chapter, December 21, 1929, in Columbus, Ohio. In 1979, the NAACP honored Berry by awarding him the William Robert Ming Advocacy Award for the spirit of financial and personal sacrifice displayed in his legal work.

== See also ==
- List of first African-American mayors

Preceded by Tom Luken	Mayor of Cincinnati, Ohio; 1972–1975	Succeeded by Bobbie L. Sterne
