= Samuel T. Britton =

American politician

Member of the Ohio House of Representatives from the 30th district
- In office January 3, 1995 – December 31, 2002
- Preceded by: Helen Rankin
- Succeeded by: Tyrone Yates

Personal details
- Born: June 29, 1933 Cincinnati, Ohio
- Died: October 10, 2011 (aged 78) Cincinnati, Ohio
- Party: Democratic

Samuel Thomas Britton (June 29, 1933 – October 10, 2011) was a former member of the Ohio House of Representatives. He represented a Cincinnati, Ohio area district from 1995 to 2002. He was succeeded by Tyrone Yates.
