= Ludlow Garage =

Music venue in Cincinnati, Ohio

Coordinates: 39°8′38″N 84°31′17″W

The Ludlow Garage
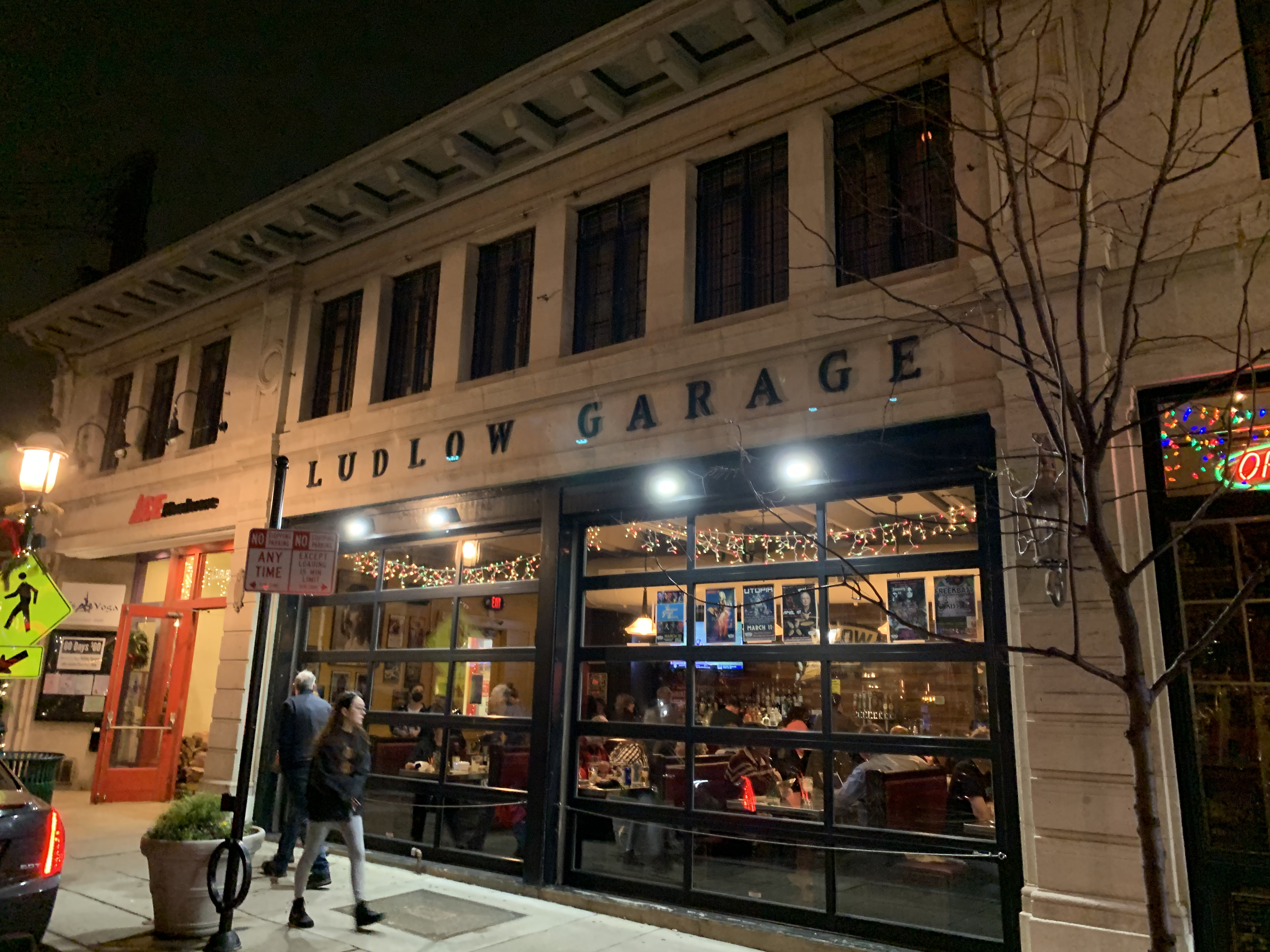
- Exterior view at night, December 2021
- Interactive map of The Ludlow Garage
- Location: 342 Ludlow Ave; Cincinnati, Ohio

Construction
- Opened: Sept 1969
- Closed: February 1971
- Reopened: 2015

Website
- ludlowgaragecincinnati.com

The Ludlow Garage began life as an automobile shop and later became a music venue located in the Clifton neighborhood of Cincinnati, Ohio. The original music venue hosted concerts from September 19, 1969 through January 20, 1971. The original proprietor of the music venue was ex-City Council member and Vice Mayor Jim Tarbell.

In the 1970s, the venue hosted concerts by many prominent touring acts including Sheena Easton, The Allman Brothers Band, Santana, Spirit, The James Gang, Humble Pie, Grand Funk Railroad, Taj Mahal, The Kinks, Albert King, NRBQ, Iggy Pop And The Stooges, Mountain, MC5, Lemon Pipers, B.B. King, Alice Cooper, Johnny Winter, Ry Cooder, Captain Beefheart, Commander Cody & His Lost Planet Airmen, Mother Earth, Neil Young, as well as local acts such as Pure Prairie League, Balderdash, Bitter Blood Street Theatre and Stone Fox.

Some recordings from the original Ludlow Garage have been officially released. The Allman Brothers Band's live album Live at Ludlow Garage: 1970 and NRBQ'sLive at Ludlow Garage were recorded at the club. A 2-CD/1-DVD release titled Still Truckin' contains performances recorded at the original venue; artists on the compilation include Santana, the Allman Brothers, Taj Mahal, the Incredible String Band, Cold Blood, and NRBQ.

The original concert level is now home to Ace Hardware-Clifton since June 2009. On the basement level, a concert venue was created and named after the historic site and was opened by Scott and Maria Crawford. It started featuring live music again on October 29, 2015 and now hosts live music several nights a week. Artists who have performed at the Ludlow Garage since its reopening include Rickie Lee Jones, Blue Öyster Cult, Cowboy Junkies, Alejandro Escovedo, Madeline Peyroux, John Sebastian, David Sanborn, Son Volt, Dweezil Zappa, Wishbone Ash, Hot Tuna, The Tubes, Larry Carlton, 10,000 Maniacs, Joey McIntyre, and Pure Prairie League. The venue seats 500 people for reserved seating shows. Ludlow Garage has a bar and restaurant on the first floor, and it is now owned by Dave and Claudia Taylor.
