= Jim Tarbell =

American politician

James (Jim) Tarbell is an American politician of the Charter Party, who was a member of the city council and vice-mayor of Cincinnati, Ohio. By mayoral proclamation, Jim Tarbell holds the title "Mr. Cincinnati" for life.

== Early life and education ==
Tarbell's family moved from a small Ohio town to the Hyde Park neighborhood of Cincinnati in 1946. He attended St. Xavier High School and graduated from Withrow High School in 1960 before attending the Lowell Technological Institute in Lowell, Massachusetts. He returned to Cincinnati in 1967.

== Business career ==
Tarbell opened the Ludlow Garage, a local concert venue, in September 1969 and operated it until its closing in 1971, featuring artists such as Grand Funk Railroad, Spirit, Santana, Elvin Bishop, The Kinks, Humble Pie, Sons of Champlin, Cold Blood, Boz Scaggs, James Gang, Bo Didley, Iggy and the Stooges, MC5, Fairport Convention, Taj Mahal, NRBQ, Commander Cody, Herbie Mann, the Staple Singers, Alice Cooper, The Lemon Pipers, Neil Young and the Allman Brothers, who recorded a live album there. From 1976 to 1998, he owned Arnold's Bar and Grill, the oldest continuously operated bar in Cincinnati.

== Political career ==
In 1997, Tarbell began his political career by campaigning in his now well-known top hat and tails. He was first appointed to Cincinnati City Council in 1998 to replace the retiring Bobbie L. Sterne, was elected in 1999, and re-elected in 2001, 2003 and 2005. Until 2003, when Christopher Smitherman won a seat on the council, Tarbell was the sole Charterite on the council. In 2005, Tarbell was appointed Vice Mayor by Mark Mallory, the newly elected Mayor of Cincinnati. Because of term limits, Tarbell could not run for re-election in the November 2007 election.

In March 2010, Tarbell ran for Hamilton County Commissioner for the first time. In September 2014, Tarbell announced that he was running for Hamilton County Commissioner again, this time as a write-in candidate.
