= Moran, Ohio =

- Place
- Location in Ohio and the United States Moran, Ohio (the United States)
- Coordinates: 41°15′50″N 81°23′18″W
- Country: United States
- State: Ohio
- County: Portage
- City: Streetsboro
- Elevation: 1,027 ft (313 m)
- Time zone: UTC−5 (EST)
  - Summer (DST): UTC−4 (EDT)
- ZIP codes: 44241, 44236
- Area codes: 330, 234
- GNIS feature ID: 1071104

Moran is a place in Portage County, in the U.S. state of Ohio. It is located in the western edge of Streetsboro, near its border with Hudson along Aurora Hudson Road.

== History ==
Moran had its start on a stagecoach line and was also known as Jesse, Moran Station, and Streetsboro Corners. Later, it was a stop on the Wheeling and Lake Erie Railway. A post office called Jesse was established in 1887, and remained in operation until 1924. Interstate 480 was built through the area in the mid-1960s.

Moran has remnants of a portion of the unfinished "Clinton Air Line", railroad, reportedly named for DeWitt Clinton. A bridge foundation remains at Tinker's Creek and some of the line was visible during the construction of the "Step Two" manufacturing plant. Also contains a small Civil War Veterans burial site (on private property).

== Notable person ==
Bobbie L. Sterne, mayor of Cincinnati in the late 1970s, was born at Moran in 1919.
