= Greg Landsman =

American politician (born 1976)

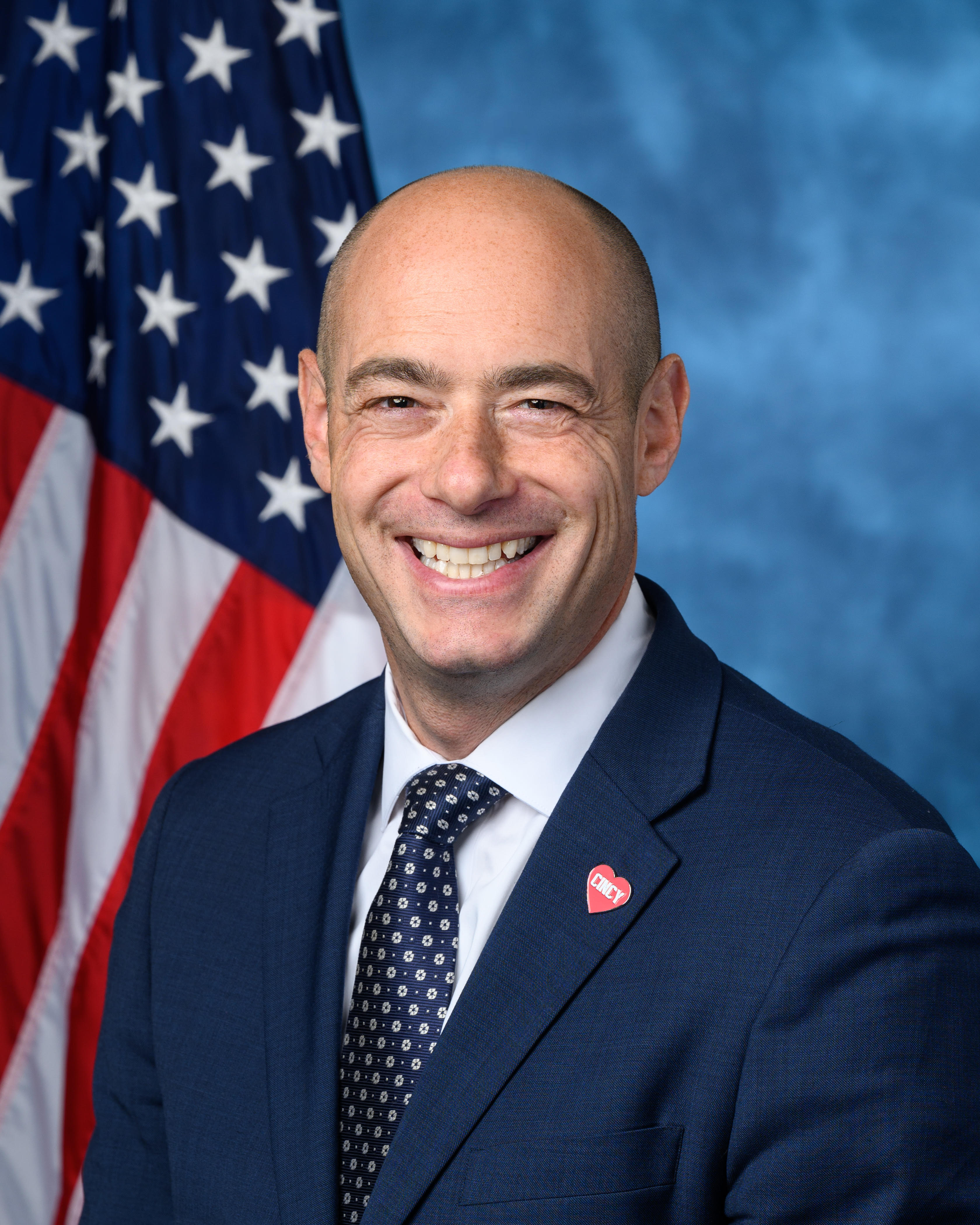
- Official portrait, 2023

Member of the U.S. House of Representatives from Ohio's 1st district
- Incumbent
- Assumed office January 3, 2023
- Preceded by: Steve Chabot

Member of the Cincinnati City Council
- In office January 2, 2018 – December 19, 2022
- Preceded by: Kevin Flynn
- Succeeded by: Seth Walsh

Personal details
- Born: Gregory John Landsman; December 4, 1976 (age 49) Cincinnati, Ohio, U.S.
- Party: Democratic
- Spouse: Sarah Landsman
- Children: 2
- Education: Ohio University (BA); Harvard University (MA)
- Website: House website Campaign website

Gregory John Landsman (born December 4, 1976) is an American politician who has been the U.S. representative from Ohio's 1st congressional district since 2023. The district is based in Cincinnati, and includes most of its inner suburbs.

A member of the Democratic Party, Landsman served on the Cincinnati City Council from 2018 to 2022. Before entering politics, he was a public school teacher. He directed Ohio's faith-based initiatives office under Governor Ted Strickland and led the 2016 campaign for Cincinnati Preschool Promise, a levy that funds preschool for the city's three and four year olds.

Landsman was elected to the United States House of Representatives in the 2022 election, defeating 13-term incumbent Steve Chabot, and was reelected in 2024 and 2026. He is described as a centrist Democrat by The New York Times.

== Early life and education ==
Landsman was born and raised in Cincinnati, Ohio, to a Jewish family. He earned a Bachelor of Arts degree in economics and political science from Ohio University in 1999 and a Master of Arts degree in theological studies from Harvard Divinity School in 2004. Before entering politics, Landsman worked as a public school teacher. Governor Ted Strickland appointed Landsman to be his director of faith-based and community initiatives in 2007.

Landsman served as executive director for StrivePartnership until December 2015. He then led Preschool Promise, an initiative to make two years of preschool available to all three- and four-year-olds in Cincinnati. Preschool Promise was incorporated into a joint levy with Cincinnati Public Schools, and the levy passed in November 2016, with about 62 percent of the vote, providing about $48 million for the program

== Cincinnati City Council ==
Landsman ran for the Cincinnati City Council in 2013 and lost. He ran again in 2017, and was elected to one of the council's seats in the November general election. He was sworn in on January 2, 2018.

In 2018, Landsman and four other city councilors (P.G. Sittenfeld, Chris Seelbach, Wendell Young, and Tamaya Dennard), known collectively as the "Gang of Five", were found to be discussing city business via text messages. They talked about how to keep the city manager and potentially regain power from the mayor. In March 2019, the Gang of Five agreed to turn over their text messages in order to settle a lawsuit filed by a local anti-tax activist. The text messages were made searchable and posted on the website of the law firm that sued the Gang of Five. No criminal charges were filed.

In the city's 2020 budget which was adopted during the COVID-19 pandemic, he supported ordinances directing $2 million in federal CARES Act funds to support minority-owned businesses. In August 2021, during a spike in gun violence in the city, Landsman proposed re-establishing the city's Safe and Clean Fund with $500,000 in city money matched by corporate donations, to help pay for community-led public safety projects.

Landsman was reelected in 2021. In December 2021, Mayor-elect Aftab Pureval named him chair of the council's Budget and Finance Committee. Landsman resigned from the council on December 19, 2022, to take his seat in Congress.

== U.S. House of Representatives ==
=== Elections ===
==== 2022 ====
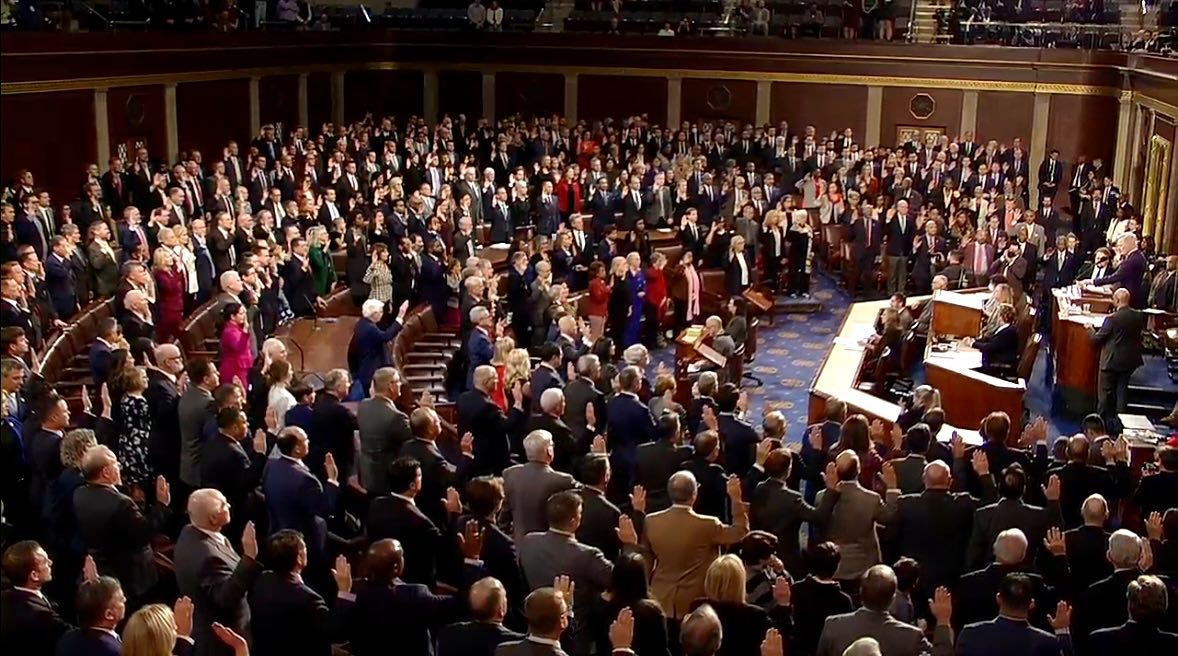
Landsman and the 118th Congress are sworn into the U.S. House of Representatives, 2023

In 2021, national Democrats recruited Landsman to run against long-time Republican incumbent Steve Chabot for the United States House of Representatives seat from Ohio's 1st congressional district in the 2022 elections. Chabot had held the seat for all but one term since 1995. Landsman announced his candidacy in January 2022 and defeated Chabot in the November election 53% to 47%.

==== 2024 ====
On November 5, 2024, Landsman won re-election to his house seat against Republican Orlando Sonza 55% to 45%.

==== 2026 ====
Landsman is sought a third term, and in the general election, he faced Eric Conroy who was endorsed by President Donald Trump. The Ohio Redistricting Commission approved a new map that made the 1st district more Republican. The Cook Political Report rated the new district as an R+5. Landsman won re-election against Conroy 56% to 44%.

=== Tenure ===
Landsman took office on January 7, 2023, as the U.S. representative for Ohio’s 1st congressional district. During the 118th Congress, he served on the Small Business Committee and the Veterans' Affairs Committee. In the House, he was known as a centrist. In his first year, he supported the bipartisan Rail Act, which called for increased train inspections and stronger penalties to help prevent future accidents following the 2023 Norfolk Southern freight train derailment in East Palestine, Ohio.

In 2024, Landsman co-sponsored the bipartisan NO BOSS Act, which encouraged states to offer self-employment assistance programs, which would allow entrepreneurs to collect unemployment benefits while starting their own businesses. In mid-July, he called for Joe Biden to withdraw from the 2024 presidential race. He was one of the organizers in September 2024 of a bipartisan discharge petition that gathered 218 signatures to force a House vote on the Social Security Fairness Act, which repealed provisions that reduced Social Security benefits for retirees who also receive other government pensions. Later in October, he co-sponsored the bipartisan What Works for Preventing Veteran Suicide Act, which sought to strengthen suicide prevention and mental health support for veterans by improving data collection to identify the most effective programs.

Following his reelection, Landsman was appointed in 2025 to the House Energy and Commerce Committee, where he served on the Health Subcommittee. During the 119th Congress, legislation he had introduced requiring pharmacy benefit managers to pass Medicare Part D prescription drug rebates to insurers was enacted as part of the 2026 federal budget. During the 2025 federal government shutdown, Landsman voted against the Republican funding bill. He also introduced legislation to restore funding for efforts to locate Ukrainian children abducted by Russia during the Russo-Ukrainian War; the measure passed the House as part of the 2026 National Defense Authorization Act. In November 2025, he voted against a bill that reopened the government, saying that it did not extend expiring Affordable Care Act premium subsidies. He signed and helped organize a discharge petition to force a vote on extending temporary protected status for Haitians, an issue affecting thousands of Haitian residents of Springfield, Ohio. The bill passed the House in April 2026.

=== Committee assignments ===
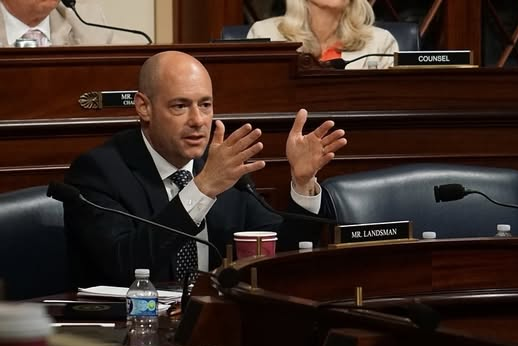
Landsman on the Veterans' Affair Committee

Landsman's committee assignments for the 119th Congress include:

- Committee on Energy and Commerce
  - Subcommittee on Health
  - Subcommittee on Communications and Technology
  - Subcommittee on Environment, Manufacturing, and Critical Minerals

=== Caucus memberships ===
Landsman's caucus memberships include:

- New Democrat Coalition (communication chair)
- Problem Solvers Caucus (whip)
- Lowering Costs Caucus, (co-chair)
- What Works Caucus, (co-chair and co-founder)
- Future Forum

== Political positions ==
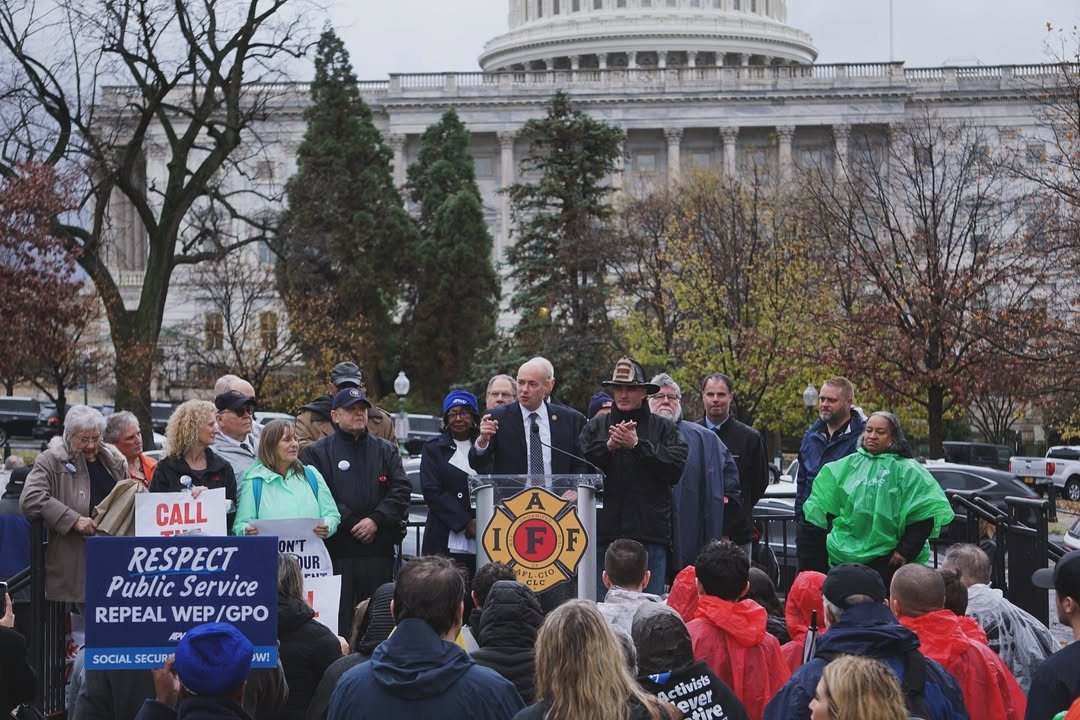
Landsman speaks in support of the Social Security Fairness Act

The New York Times described Landsman as a centrist Democrat. He is a member of the bipartisan Problem Solvers Caucus. Landsman has said he favors working with House Republicans on issues such as government funding and border security, while describing the protection of Social Security and Medicare as a line he will not cross.

=== Healthcare ===
Landsman has supported lowering prescription drug costs and increasing transparency in pharmaceutical pricing. In 2023, he introduced the Making Insulin Affordable for All Children Act, which aimed to cap insulin costs at $35 per month for individuals aged 26 and younger with private insurance or Medicaid. In 2024, he introduced the Medicare PBM Accountability Act to increase transparency by requiring pharmacy benefit managers to disclose profits and address pricing discrepancies. Landsman opposed the medicaid reductions in the One Big Beautiful Bill Act. After its passage, he introduced a bill to restore states' ability to levy provider taxes of up to 6% of patient revenue that was previously allowed to fund Medicaid after its passage.

=== Social Security ===
Landsman was one of the main leaders of the discharge petition that forced a House vote on the Social Security Fairness Act, which eliminated the Windfall Elimination Provision and Government Pension Offset.

=== Economy ===
During his 2024 campaign, Landsman noted his support of raising the minimum wage and expanding job training. He has criticized the Trump administration's tariff policy.

=== Immigration ===
Landsman has said he supports comprehensive immigration reform combined with increased border funding. In January 2025, he was among the House Democrats who voted for the Laken Riley Act. He has opposed the Trump administration's termination of temporary protected status for Haitians, many of whom live in Springfield, Ohio, calling it a "moral issue." He helped to organize a discharge petition that brought a three-year extension to the floor for a vote in April 2026.

=== Abortion ===
Landsman supports abortion rights and wants to codify the protections of Roe v. Wade into federal law.

=== Foreign policy ===
Landsman has described himself as pro-Israel while criticizing Israeli Prime Minister Benjamin Netanyahu's conduct of the Gaza war. He supports a two-state solution and wants to support efforts to bring more humanitarian aid to Gaza. He supported the Trump administration's strikes on Iranian nuclear sites, criticizing Trump for acting without building an international coalition but arguing that they had weakened the Iranian regime.

Landsman was one of four House Democrats who initially supported the second Donald Trump administration's decision to launch the 2026 Iran war. On March 5, 2026, he was one of four Democrats to oppose a War Powers Resolution to end U.S. involvement in the war. He proposed his own alternate resolution which would have given the administration 30 days to finish operations instead with stronger congressional oversight of the operation. Later that month, Landsman declared his opposition to continuing the war on April 6, saying that it was "time to be done" and that he would support additional War Powers Resolution votes if they came to the floor. On April 16, he voted for a second resolution.

=== Law enforcement ===
In 2023, Landsman co-introduced the bipartisan Enhancing COPS Hiring Program Grants for Local Law Enforcement Act, alongside Representatives Emilia Sykes, Mike Carey, and Max Miller. The bill proposes allowing law enforcement agencies to use federal grants for recruitment and retention bonuses.

== Personal life ==
Landsman lives with his wife, Sarah, and their two children in Cincinnati.

== Electoral history ==
Ohio's 1st congressional district, 2022
Party	Candidate	Votes	%
Democratic	Greg Landsman	156,416	52.76
Republican	Steve Chabot (incumbent)	140,058	47.24
Total votes		296,474	100.0
Democratic gain from Republican			

Ohio's 1st congressional district, 2024
Party	Candidate	Votes	%
Democratic	Greg Landsman (incumbent)	213,916	54.58
Republican	Orlando Sonza	177,993	45.42
Total votes		391,909	100.0
Democratic hold			

Ohio's 1st congressional district, 2026
Primary election
Party	Candidate	Votes	%
Democratic	Greg Landsman (incumbent)	36,984	67.90
Democratic	Damon Lynch IV	17,483	32.10
Total votes		54,467	100.0

U.S. House of Representatives
Preceded by Steve Chabot	Member of the U.S. House of Representatives from Ohio's 1st congressional district 2023–present	Incumbent
U.S. order of precedence (ceremonial)
Preceded by Nick LaLota	United States representatives by seniority 325th	Succeeded by Nick Langworthy
