= Yvette Simpson =

American politician

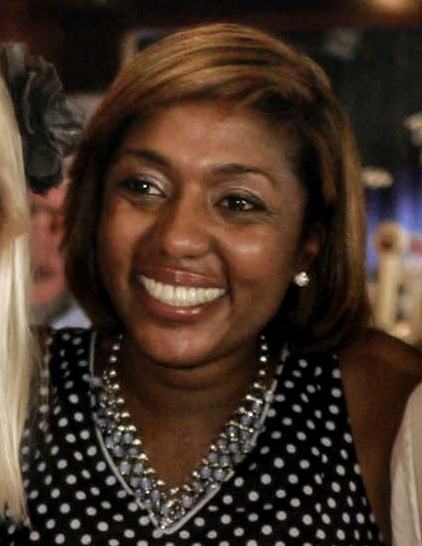

Member of the Cincinnati City Council
- In office December 1, 2011 – January 2, 2018

Personal details
- Born: Yvette Renee Simpson; August 2, 1978 (age 48) Cincinnati, Ohio, U.S.
- Party: Democratic (Charterite)
- Education: Princeton High School; Miami University (BA; BS); Xavier University (MBA); University of Cincinnati (JD)
- Website: http://yvettesimpson.com

Yvette Renee Simpson (born August 2, 1978) is an American politician, lawyer, former member of the Cincinnati City Council. She is the former chief executive of Democracy for America.

== Education ==
Simpson received an undergraduate degree from Miami University, a J.D. degree from the University of Cincinnati, and an M.B.A. from Xavier University.

== Political career ==
Simpson was sworn into the Cincinnati City Council in 2011, which led to the Council having its first African-American majority.

Simpson unsuccessfully challenged incumbent Mayor John Cranley in the 2017 Cincinnati mayoral election. She received a greater percentage of the votes in the primary (45%) than her top competitors Cranley (35%) or Rob Richardson Jr. (20%). She lost in the general election by a margin of 46% to Cranley's 54%.

== Democracy for America ==
On January 1, 2019, Simpson became chief executive of Democracy for America, a national progressive grassroots organizing group founded by former presidential candidate Howard Dean. She was the group's first ever female chief executive. Simpson announced she would step down from the position in 2022, and later resigned on 7 December as the organization neared bankruptcy.

== Personal life ==
In June 2019, she became a political news contributor with ABC.
