= Todd Portune =

American politician (1958–2020)

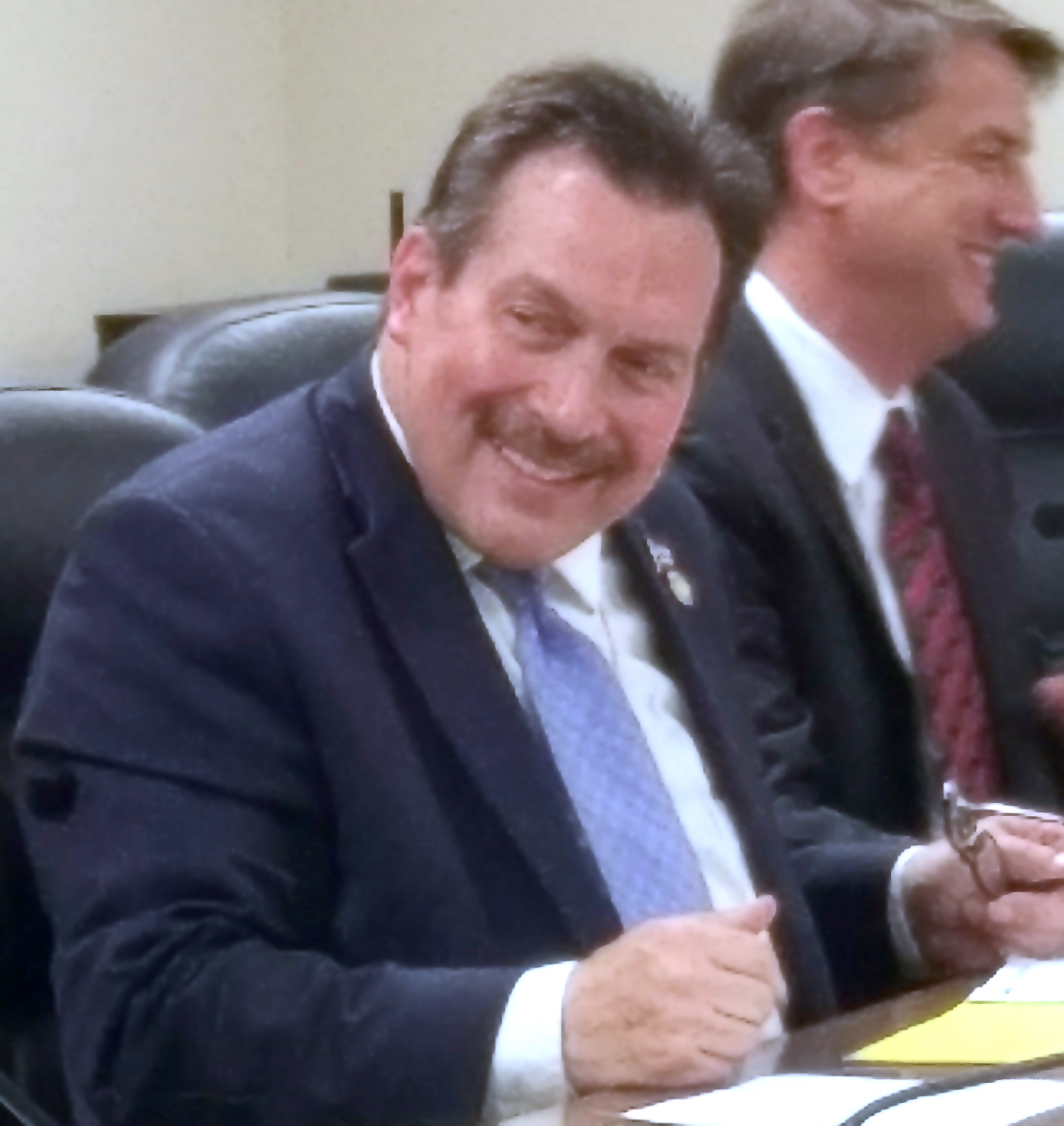
- Portune at a public hearing in 2017

Hamilton County Commissioner
- In office January 2, 2001 – December 31, 2019
- Preceded by: Bob Bedinghaus
- Succeeded by: Victoria Parks (acting)

Member of the Cincinnati City Council
- In office 1993–2001

Personal details
- Born: Todd Brian Portune; August 14, 1958; Cincinnati, Ohio, U.S.
- Died: January 25, 2020 (aged 61); Cincinnati, Ohio, U.S.
- Political party: Democratic
- Children: 3
- Education: Oberlin College; University of Cincinnati College of Law
- Occupation: Attorney

Todd Brian Portune (August 14, 1958 – January 25, 2020) was an American lawyer and politician who served as a member of the Cincinnati City Council and as a Hamilton County Commissioner. Portune was regarded as left of center on social issues, and a fiscal conservative.

== Early life ==
Portune was born in Cincinnati, Ohio in 1958. The son of a professor at the University of Cincinnati, he grew up in Cincinnati's West Side. His father died when Portune was 14, with his mother returning to work to support Portune and his two brothers. He graduated from Colerain High School in 1976, and graduated from Oberlin College in 1980 with a political science degree. In 1983 he graduated from the University of Cincinnati College of Law and became an attorney in Cincinnati.

== Political career ==
=== Cincinnati city councilman ===
Portune was appointed to fill a vacancy on the Cincinnati City Council in 1993. He won elections to two-year terms in 1993, 1995, 1997 and 1999.

=== County commissioner ===
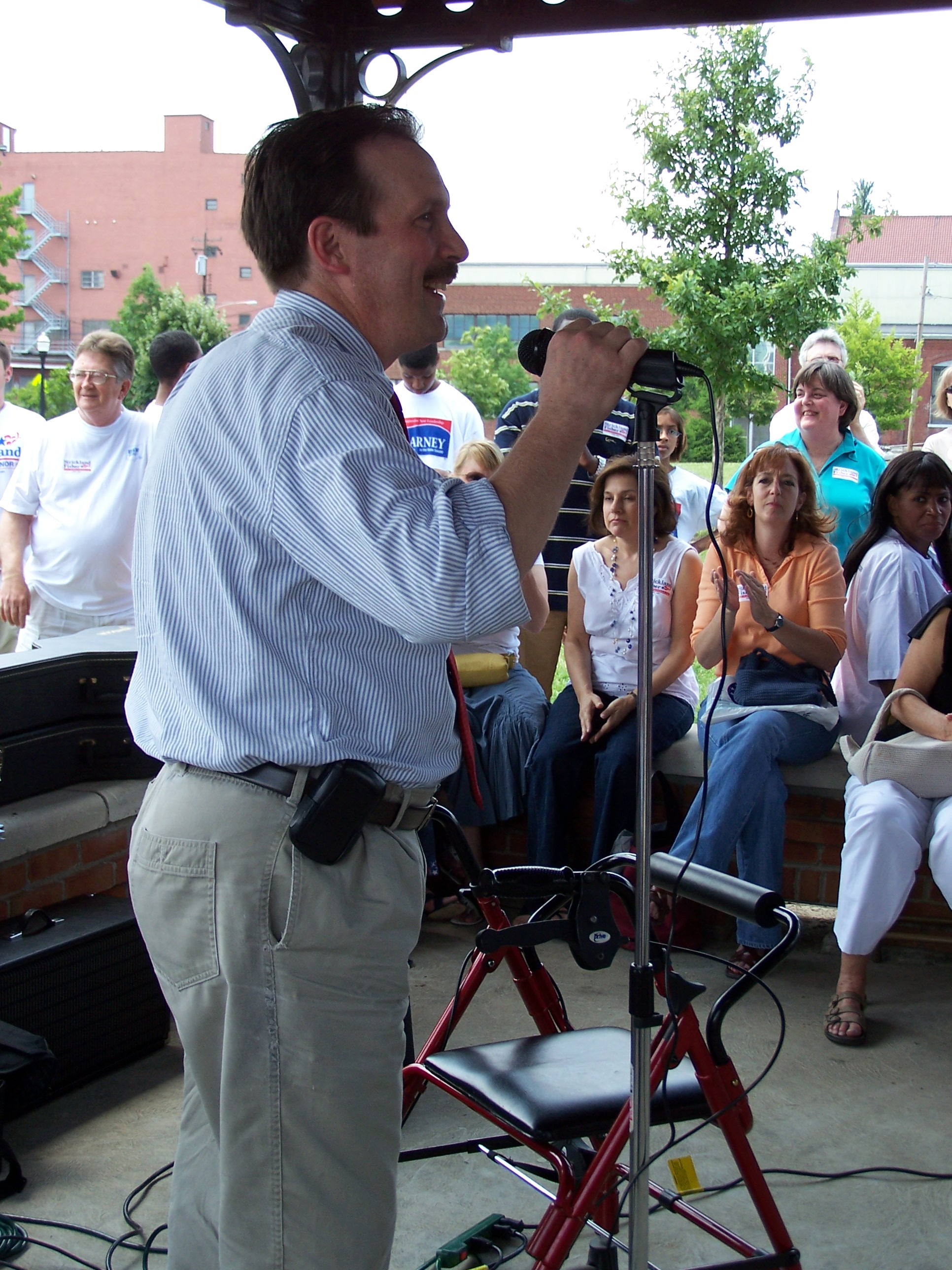
Portune addresses a crowd at a Turnaround Ohio rally in Cincinnati in 2006.

In 2000 Portune was elected as a Hamilton County Commissioner. Cincinnati has voted solidly for Democratic candidates in the early 21st-century; the suburbs have supported the Republicans. Portune was the first Democrat from the suburbs elected Commissioner in 36 years. Portune's opponent Bob Bedinghaus won 43% of the 363,948 votes cast in 2000, while Portune won 48%. Portune was sworn in on January 2, 2001. In 2004 Portune was re-elected, with 57% to his opponent's 42%.

=== Potential candidate for Governor in 2014 ===
In December 2013 Portune announced that he was considering becoming a candidate for the Democratic nomination for governor in the 2014 elections. Portune visited several locations in Ohio during December 2013 and January 2014, visiting voters and gauging the support he could expect if he formalized his candidacy. In mid-January, Portune indicated that a decision was imminent.

In late January news reports indicated that Portune had discussed with former Toledo Mayor Jack Ford the possibility of becoming Portune's Lieutenant Governor running mate. On January 31, he announced that he would not be a candidate, making the decision just days before the early February deadline to file nominating petitions to qualify for a place on the primary election ballot.

== Personal life ==
Portune resided in Green Township with his wife Angelia, and their children, Ellyse Lautner Portune, Ethan Portune, and Emma Portune.

== Death ==
Portune was diagnosed with cancer in 2003. Later that year, his spinal tumors erupted, causing paralysis of the legs. Portune's left leg was amputated in 2018. After years of remission, his cancer returned and metastasized. Portune stated in September 2019 that he would not run for re-election in 2020, and announced the following month he would retire at the end of the year. His chief of staff, Victoria Parks, began acting in his role for the remainder of his term, which ended at the end of 2020. Portune died from cancer on January 25, 2020, in Cincinnati, Ohio. He was 61 years old.
