= Planning and zoning commission =

Metro authorized authority

A planning and zoning commission is a local elected or appointed government board charged with recommending to the local town, city, or county council/commission the boundaries of the various original zoning districts and appropriate regulations to be enforced therein, and any proposed amendments thereto. In addition, the Planning and Zoning Commission collects data and keeps itself informed as to the best practices generally in effect in the matter of city planning and zoning. It may be qualified to act on measures affecting the present and future movement of traffic, the segregation of residential and business districts, and the convenience and safety of persons and property in any way dependent on city planning and zoning.

Some jurisdictions also have a separate planning board and a separate zoning board, with each respective board performing the specified function (amending the comprehensive plan versus rezoning) as opposed to a unified planning and zoning board that deals with both.

The chairman of the Planning and Zoning Commission (or a staff member) is responsible for publishing public hearings in the newspaper about certain matters that come before the commission. Most municipal or county Planning and Zoning Commissions consist of five to seven members. This number does not include alternates. In some states, planning and zoning commissions are regional or county.

Some communities elect planning and zoning commission members. In other jurisdictions, the Planning and Zoning Commissioners are appointed by the Mayor or First Selectman of the city or town and approved by the city's legislative body, i.e., city council, board of aldermen, etc. Some planning commissioners are appointed by the City Commission as a whole. Some larger local jurisdictions refer to the single head of the planning department as a planning commissioner, but that is not to be confused with planning commissioners who make up the planning commission.

Planning and zoning commissions may also be approving agencies for development permits and specific variances to the zoning code for development. Other jurisdictions may have a separate zoning board of adjustments and appeals that performs the function instead of the planning and zoning commission doing it. In fact, some of those jurisdictions have featured court-appointed boards of adjustment and appeals due to the quasi-judicial functions.
