= Harry Black (city manager) =

American politician

15th City Manager of Cincinnati
- In office September 8, 2014 – April 21, 2018
- Preceded by: Milton Dohoney Jr.

Finance Director of the City of Baltimore
- In office January 2012 – August 2014

Personal details
- Born: Harry Eugene Black; January 6, 1963 (age 62) Jersey City, Hudson County, New Jersey, United States
- Relations: Wife Sheryl; 2 children
- Website: http://www.cincinnati-oh.gov/manager/

Harry Eugene Black (born January 6, 1963) is former a City Manager of Cincinnati, Ohio. He took office September 8, 2014, and was responsible for the day-to-day government operations of Ohio's third largest city. He resigned from the position April 21, 2018. Before coming to Cincinnati, Black was finance director of the City of Baltimore. Before that he held leadership roles such as CEO, CFO and COO in both the private and public sector in cities across the country.

== Background ==
Black was born in Jersey City, New Jersey in 1963. His parents moved to Baltimore before his first birthday and he went on to spend his entire adolescent life and part of his adult life there. He attended and graduated from Paul Lawrence Dunbar High School (1976-1981). where he was captain of the cross-country team. His start in government came during his senior year when he was a student page in Maryland's General Assembly in Annapolis.

After graduating, Black went on to attend Virginia State University where he majored in Public Administration. He was president of the student government and in the summer of 1985 he was a Governors Fellow in the office of former Virginia Gov. Charles Robb. He was also managing editor of the school's paper, the Virginia Statesman. He later earned a Master's in Public Administration from the University of Virginia.

== Professional life ==
Black's public service career includes stints with the New York City Transit Authority, the Port Authority of New York and New Jersey, New York City's Mayor's Office of Contracts and the District of Columbia's City Council. For three years (2005-2008) he was Chief Financial Officer for the City of Richmond, Virginia.

He joined his wife in co-managing Global Commerce Solutions, Inc., a District of Columbia-based government services firm founded by both. Prior to that, Black held the position of vice president and program manager at McKissack & McKissack, an architecture and engineering firm based in Washington, D.C.

Black took the job as Baltimore's CFO in January 2012. There, he oversaw an All-Funds Budget of $3.3 billion supporting a workforce of 15,000 providing services to more than 620,000 residents, and achieved an S&P upgrade of Baltimore's bond rating. While in Baltimore he authored a 10-year financial plan, Change to Grow.

Black left Baltimore in August 2014 to become the 15th City Manager of Cincinnati. One of his major accomplishments during his time in Cincinnati is the launch of the Office of Performance of Data Analytics, a first-of-its-kind venture that looks to streamline government processes and cut down on City spending.

Black, is the author of Achieving Economic Development Success: Tools that work. The book was published by the International City/County Management Association. He also co-authored "City of Baltimore at an Inflection Point - Bending the Mix of Total Remuneration" which the Journal of Compensation and Benefits published in July 2014.
