= Alicia Reece =

American politician

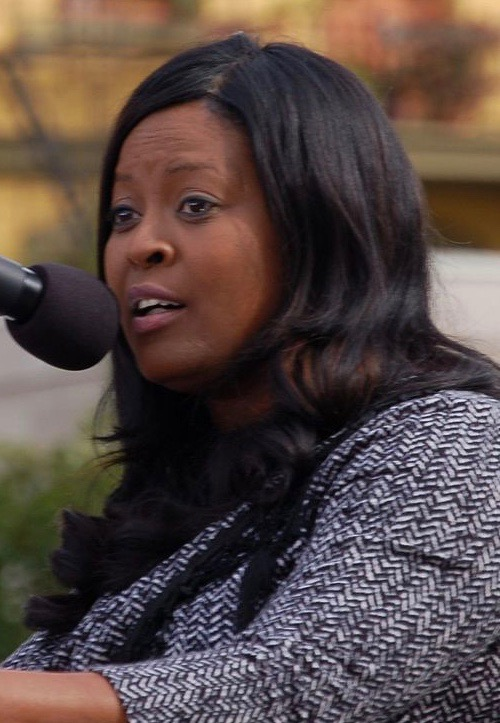
- Reece at a political rally in 2016

Hamilton County Commissioner
- Incumbent
- Assumed office January 2, 2021 Serving with Denise Driehaus and Stephanie Summerow Dumas
- Preceded by: Victoria Parks (acting)

Member of the Ohio House of Representatives from the 33rd district
- In office March 3, 2010 – December 31, 2018
- Preceded by: Tyrone Yates
- Succeeded by: Sedrick Denson

Vice Mayor of Cincinnati
- In office 2002–2007
- Succeeded by: Roxanne Qualls

Member of the Cincinnati City Council
- In office 2002–2007

Personal details
- Born: Alicia Michelle Reece; April 25, 1971 (age 55) Cincinnati, Ohio, U.S.
- Party: Democratic
- Education: Grambling State University
- Website: http://votealiciareece.com/

Alicia Michelle Reece (born April 25, 1971) is a Democratic politician currently serving as a Hamilton County Commissioner. She formerly served as a member of the Ohio House of Representatives for the 33rd district. She was previously the Vice Mayor of Cincinnati from 2002 to 2007.

== Life and career ==
Reece is a graduate of Withrow High School International Studies Academy and Grambling State University. Before becoming a state legislator she was on the city council of Cincinnati and was the city's deputy mayor.

== Ohio House of Representatives ==
She was appointed to the House of Representatives in 2010, replacing Tyrone Yates who became a judge. She was reelected in 2010 with 69.2% of the vote. She served on the committees of Economic and Small Business Development; Finance and Appropriations; and Local Government.

In October 2011 Reece was named as the vice-chair of the Ohio Women’s Democratic Caucus.

Reece won a second term in 2012 with 73.29% of the vote over Tom Bryan.

== Electoral history ==
2020 Hamilton County Commissioner election
Party	Candidate	Votes	%
Democratic	Alicia Reece	212,638	50.78
Republican	Andy Black	187,263	44.72
Independent	Herman J. Najoli	18,843	4.50
