= Chris Bortz =

Cincinnati politician and businessman

Member of the Cincinnati City Council
- In office 2005–2011

Personal details
- Born: September 10, 1973 (age 53) Cincinnati, Ohio, U.S.
- Party: Charter Committee
- Profession: Politician

Chris Bortz (born September 10, 1973) is a politician from Cincinnati, Ohio. He was elected to the Cincinnati City Council in 2005 as a member of the Charter Party. Bortz is a registered Republican. Bortz was born in Cincinnati and attended Cincinnati Country Day School for high school; he attended Tufts University for his undergraduate education, and received a J.D. from the University of Arizona. Before his time on the City Council, Bortz served on the Charter Committee Board since 1997, as well as the Cincinnati Electoral Reform Commission, a panel created to study Cincinnati government.

== Early career ==
Bortz attended high school at Cincinnati Country Day School and later went on to graduate from Tufts University in Boston and studied Jacobean theater at the British American Drama Academy. Upon finishing college, Bortz became a teacher at Country Day for sixth-grade English and 8th grade Philosophy and served as the Dean of Faculty for Summerbridge Cincinnati, a summer school program designed to give academically qualified, underprivileged students the opportunity to advance their education in a rigorous, nurturing academic environment. Chris also coached the football, track, baseball and wrestling teams.

After graduating from law school at the University of Arizona in Tucson, Bortz moved to Cincinnati and joined Towne Properties (a real estate developer) as General Counsel and Special Projects Director. Chris worked closely with his uncle, Arn Bortz, who served nine years on the Cincinnati City Council and one term as Mayor of Cincinnati in the early 1980s.

== Cincinnati City Council 2005–2011 ==
Bortz was a co-founder of the GO Cincinnati plan for economic development. In May 2006, he signed onto a motion along with Laketa Cole that created an automatic tax exemption for LEED Certified Silver, Gold, or Platinum standards in order to encourage more sustainable development in Cincinnati. The motion created a Community Development Block Grant as well to help finance structures for builders. He has also been a major advocate for shared services, sitting on the steering committee for GCEP (Government Cooperation and Efficiency Project) In April 2008, Bortz signed onto the motion that moved for $50,000 be allocated for a professional services contact with the Regional Planning Commission in order to match Hamilton County's $50,000. The goal of the motion was to not create a regional government, but to reduce the cost of government while also improving the quality of services provided. In September 2010, Councilman Bortz signed on to a motion to increase economic development in and attract businesses to Cincinnati to enter into a contractual agreement with the Port Authority to implement the GO Cincinnati Plan. As the motion stated, "the Port Authority will become the catalytic development corporation tasked with concentrating development expertise and financial resources required to implement GO Cincinnati, creating jobs and private investment in the City of Cincinnati.

Bortz ran for reelection in 2011 and received 22,044 votes. He received the tenth most votes out of nine possible spots on city council, and was not re-elected.

== Professional achievements ==
=== Board memberships ===
Electoral Reform Commission Member

Breakthrough Collaborative Board Member

Cincinnati Country Day School Board Member

Jewish Community Relations Council Board Member
