= Tyrone Yates =

American politician

Member of the Ohio House of Representatives from the 33rd district
- In office January 3, 2003 – February 5, 2010
- Preceded by: Samuel T. Britton
- Succeeded by: Alicia Reece

Personal details
- Born: January 22, 1954 (age 72) Cincinnati, Ohio
- Party: Democratic
- Education: University of Cincinnati, University of Toledo
- Profession: Attorney, Educator

Tyrone Keith Yates (born January 22, 1954) is a Hamilton County Municipal Court Judge. He was elected on November 8, 2011.

Judge Yates is a former Democratic member of the Ohio House of Representatives, representing the 33rd District from 2003-2010.

== Early life ==
Yates was born in Cincinnati, Ohio and graduated from Withrow High School in 1972. He was voted Most Likely to Succeed, Best School Citizen and Boy Mayor of Cincinnati in 1971. He received a B.A. degree in history from the University of Cincinnati in 1978 and a J.D. from the University of Toledo College of Law in March 1981. While in law school he was a Fornoff Moot Court semifinalist, a member of the Jessup International Law Moot Court Team, was elected to the Moot Court Board and was an intern in the White House Office of the Executive Office of the president in the summer of 1979. Yates was also a member of the Order of Barristers and was elected to the governing board of the law school. Yates served as co-chair of the BALSA at UT Law School. While at the University of Cincinnati, Yates served as student body president and student representative to the UC's board of trustees. He was UBA's senator to the university senate.

== Career ==
Yates is a former assistant attorney general of Ohio and former Associate at White, Getgey, and Meyer Co., LPA.

Tyrone K. Yates was selected twice to serve as vice-mayor of Cincinnati and served as a member of Cincinnati City Council from 1990 to 1999. In the 1997 election, he was endorsed by both the Democratic Party of Hamilton County and the Charter Committee of Greater Cincinnati.

While a trial counsel in the Juvenile Division of the Hamilton County Public Defender's Office (2000-2003), Yates served as chairman of Cincinnati's Citizens Committee on Youth (2002).

Yates is a former treasurer and president of the Ohio Legislative Black Caucus and chairman of the Ohio Legislative Black Caucus Foundation. In 2008, Yates served as chairman of the Local Host Blue Ribbon Committee for the NAACP National Convention. He was elections chairman for the Ohio State Conference of the NAACP in 2008.

He is a two-time delegate to the Democratic National Convention (2004 and 2008). In 2008, Yates was a delegate pledged to United States Senator Barack Obama.

While in the Ohio House of Representatives, Yates served on the Finance and Appropriations, Ways and Means, Civil and Commercial Law, and Criminal Justice Committees. He chaired the Committee on Criminal Justice. He also served on the State Criminal Sentencing Commission. Yates was selected to serve as chairman of the eight-member bi-cameral Correctional Institution Inspections Committee. Yates served on the special legislative committee which was charged with recommending a distinguished Ohioan to be represented among the significant Americans in Statuary Hall in the United States Capitol. He is a former member of the Ohio Arts Council and a former adjunct associate professor of political science at the University of Cincinnati.

In January 2010, Ohio Governor Ted Strickland appointed Yates to fill the unexpired term of Judge Nadine Lovelace Allen.

In 2019, Yates retained his seat on Hamilton County's municipal court for the second district, winning 74.48 percent of the vote.

== Personal life ==
Yates is a former junior and senior warden of St. Andrews Episcopal Church, a Life Member of the American Angus Association, the National Association For The Advancement Of Colored People, the Association for the Study of African American Life and History, The Friends of the Harriet Beecher Stowe House, and the Navy League of the United States. He is a member of Alpha Phi Alpha fraternity, UC honorary Sigma Sigma, and The Argus Club of Cincinnati, Incorporated.

Yates received the 2010 Myrl H. Shoemaker Award from the Ohio Democratic Party. In 2009, he received the Ohio Department of Rehabilitation and Corrections Gold Star Award, the OACAA Don Striker Legislative Bulldog Award and the Oscar B. Griffith Leadership Award from Ohio Urban Resource Systems, Inc. He served on the boards of the Harriet Beecher Stowe House, Center for Holocaust and Humanity Education, Ohio Legislative Black Caucus Foundation, Cincinnati Symphony Orchestra, and SOTENI International, Inc. (an international AIDS prevention foundation working in Kenya). Yates received the NAACP Theodore M. Berry Award for 2013. He is currently chairman of SOTENI Kenya based in Kenya, and senior warden of St. Andrews Episcopal Church.

Yates is married to Karen L. Yates and has two children, Aiden and Clarke Sanders.
