= Sam Malone (politician) =

American politician

Samuel A. Malone, Jr. (born 9 December 1970) is a former Cincinnati city councilmember, serving from 2003 to 2005. He gained national prominence when he was tried on domestic violence charges for disciplining his teenage son with a leather belt.

== Biography ==
=== Early life and education ===
Malone grew up in the Cincinnati area, graduating from Western Hills High School. As a teenager, he constantly got into street fights until a local policeman mentored him. He served in the US Navy, trained in pugilism, and earned an associate degree from Vincennes University.

=== Career ===
He served as Cincinnati Council Member for two years. The negative press concerning the 2005 discipline incident is believed to be a factor in his not being reelected. In 2007, despite being a councilman at the time, he generated more controversy over the purchase of a $218,000 home on Lincoln Avenue from the city in 2005. The issue has since been resolved.

== Allegations of domestic abuse ==
The then 11-year-old son of his then-fiancée called the police after an argument where he allegedly struck and choked her.

=== 2005 discipline incident ===
On May 14, 2005, after commanding his son to strip naked, Malone disciplined his son for failing grades and misbehavior by striking his bare body repeatedly with a leather belt. Without the protection of clothing, the son developed extensive welts across his back, chest, stomach, legs, and buttocks.

The son later put on his clothes and with a friend dialed 911, afraid to return home. A relative took the child to the hospital and Malone was arrested. The relative told news reporters that some of the welts didn't subside until a month later. A few welts healed only after months passed and a report in the Cincinnati Enquirer stated one welt on his buttock disappeared only in December, more than six months later.

After Malone's arrest, he was tried for domestic violence. The Cincinnati DA recused himself from the case, citing a conflict of interest since Malone was on the board then. The prosecution deemed that while Malone may have started with a spanking, he took it too far. The audio of the teen's 911 call and a news report showing the kid's injuries were aired nationally. Malone maintained that in Ohio, he has a right to discipline his child any way he sees fit, including spanking if necessary. He also maintained that the child resisted, causing the hits elsewhere than his buttocks. It was also stated that he took off his dress shirt for greater leverage and threatened to "beat the black off him". Malone was ultimately acquitted, but still sternly lectured by the judge.
