= P.G. Sittenfeld =

American politician (born 1984)

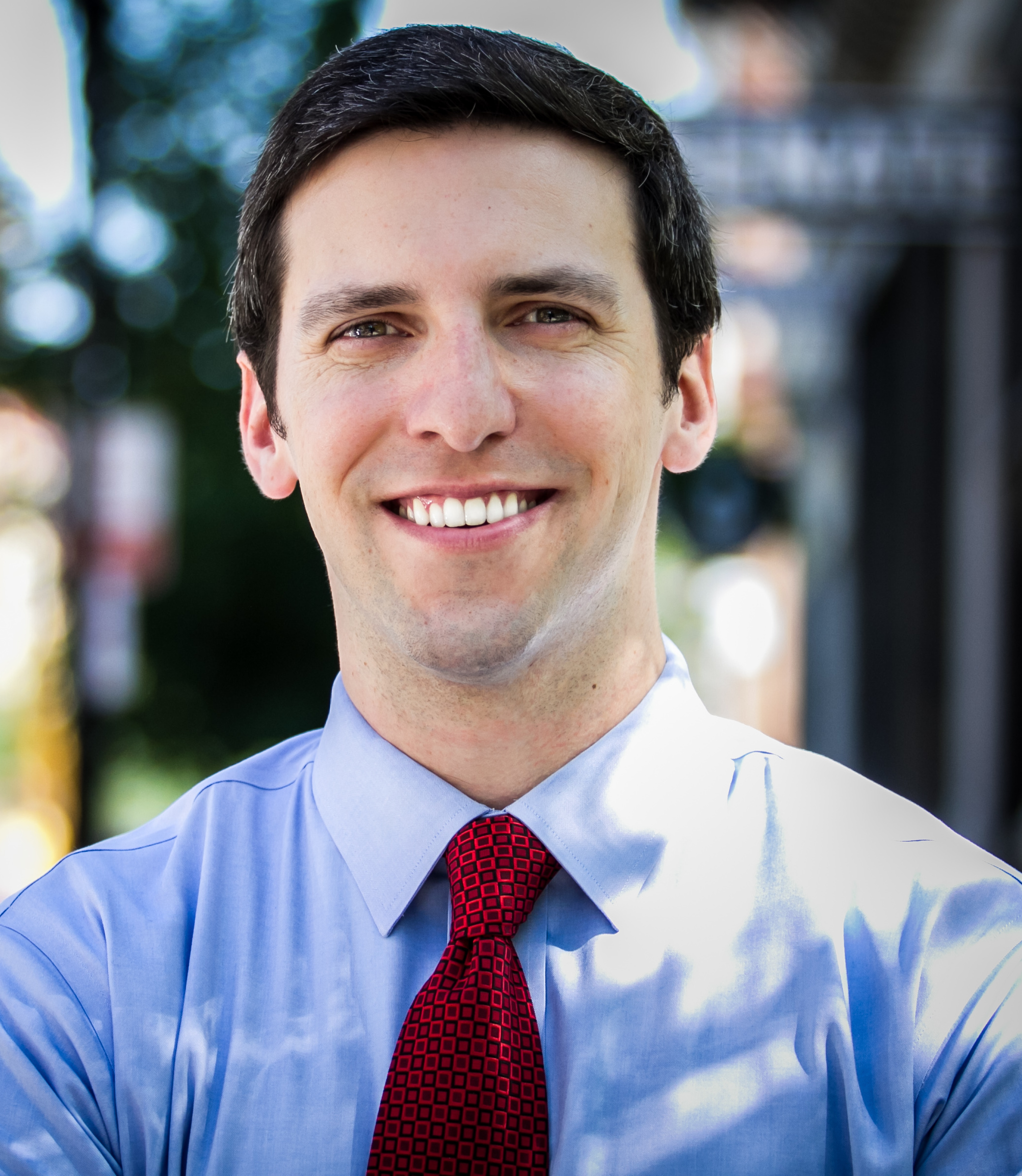
- Sittenfeld in 2015

Member of the Cincinnati City Council
- In office December 1, 2011 – January 4, 2022

Personal details
- Born: Alexander Paul George; Sittenfeld; October 1, 1984 (age 42) Cincinnati, Ohio, U.S.
- Party: Democratic
- Spouse: Sarah Coyne (m. 2016)
- Children: 2
- Relatives: Curtis Sittenfeld (sister)
- Education: Princeton University (BA); Magdalen College, Oxford (MSt); the City University (MA)
- Website: Official website
- Criminal information
- Convictions: Felony bribery and attempted extortion (2022)
- Penalty: Served approx. 5 months of a 16 month sentence; Pardoned in 2025

Alexander Paul George Sittenfeld (born October 1, 1984) is a former American politician who served on the Cincinnati City Council from 2011 to 2020. In 2022, Sittenfeld was convicted on federal charges of bribery and attempted extortion in connection with an undercover investigation by the FBI. In May 2025, following the rejection of his appeal, he was granted a pardon by President Donald Trump. Sittenfeld is currently a freelance writer and is working on a memoir.

A member of the Democratic Party, he became the youngest person ever elected to the council at the age of 27. Prior to his election, Sittenfeld was assistant director at the Community Learning Center Institute in Cincinnati. In January 2015, he announced his 2016 bid for Ohio's U.S. Senate seat, then held by Republican Rob Portman. On March 15, 2016, Sittenfeld lost the Senate Democratic primary election to former Ohio Governor Ted Strickland. On July 12, 2020, Sittenfeld announced that he would run in the 2021 Cincinnati mayoral election, but dropped out of the race following his arrest on political corruption charges.

On November 19, 2020, Sittenfeld was arrested on federal charges of corruption and bribery, and was then suspended from his seat on council. Sittenfeld's arrest was part of a broader FBI focus on rooting out political corruption in Cincinnati. Sittenfeld accepted $40,000 in bribes from undercover FBI agents posing as real estate investors in exchange for votes on a matter before the city council. On July 8, 2022, following a two-and-a-half week trial in U.S. District Court in Cincinnati, Sittenfeld was convicted on two felony counts of bribery and attempted extortion and was sentenced to 16 months in prison on October 10, 2023.

Sittenfeld began his federal prison sentence on January 2, 2024 at FCI Ashland. On May 15, 2024, Sittenfeld was released from prison pending the outcome of his appeal. His conviction and sentence were upheld on appeal in February 2025. On May 29, 2025, Sittenfeld received a "full and unconditional" pardon from President Donald Trump.

== Early life and education ==
P.G. Sittenfeld was born and raised in Cincinnati, Ohio, the youngest of four children. His mother, Betsy, is a retired school teacher who served as a librarian and art history teacher at Seven Hills School. Sittenfeld's father, Paul, started his career at Procter & Gamble, before leaving to work at Planned Parenthood, later running the Cincinnati Fine Arts Fund, and finally transitioning to become a family investment advisor. Sittenfeld's mother was Catholic and his father was Jewish.

One of his three older sisters, Curtis Sittenfeld, is a novelist known for Prep, Eligible, and Rodham.

For high school, Sittenfeld attended The Seven Hills School, an elite private school, where he was an all-city basketball player. During this time he also wrote a monthly column for The Cincinnati Enquirer and an advice column in Seventeen.

Sittenfeld matriculated at Princeton University, where he served as the president of his freshman class. He remained involved in journalism, including as a columnist for the Daily Princetonian, and as a student stringer through the University Press Club for publications including The New York Times, Trenton Times, and Princeton Alumni Weekly. He was also a member of Phi Beta Kappa. In 2007, he graduated magna cum laude with a degree in English, and was awarded a Marshall Scholarship to attend graduate school in the United Kingdom.

As a Marshall Scholar, Sittenfeld attended a master's program in English literature at Oxford University. There, he was a student at Magdalen College, and studied the works of John Steinbeck. Subsequently, he studied nonfiction creative writing at the City University in London earning a Master of Arts degree with distinction in 2010.

== Political career ==
=== Cincinnati City Council ===
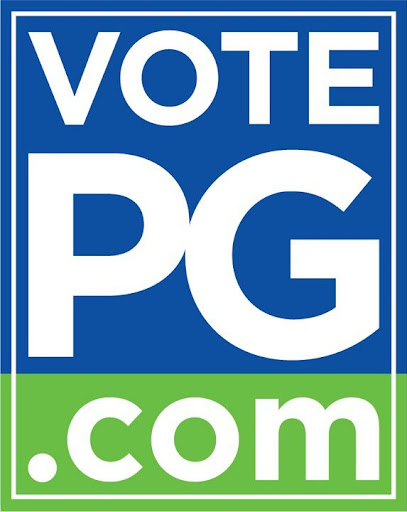
"Vote PG" logo

In 2011, at age 27, Sittenfeld became the youngest person ever elected to Cincinnati City Council. He received the second most votes of the 23 candidates. He was sworn into office on December 1, 2011.

He was re-elected to the council in 2013 and was the leading vote-getter among the 21 candidates. He ran again in 2017 & was re-elected with the most votes among the candidates for the second time in a row. Sittenfeld did not run for re-election in 2021.

==== Committee assignments ====
- Budget and Finance Committee, Member
- Education, Innovation, and Growth, Chair
- Equity, Inclusion, Youth, and the Arts, Member

==== Legislation ====
Sittenfeld sponsored legislation creating the Vacant Foreclosed Property Registry to require banks and lenders to maintain vacant foreclosed houses under their control. Since its creation, the program has generated $4,000,000 for the City of Cincinnati, and mandated the upkeep of more than 4,000 homes.

Sittenfeld started an initiative known as the "Golden Cincinnati Initiative", the purpose of which was to provide support to Cincinnati's elderly community. The initiative included the creation of the city's Chief Advocacy Officer for Aging and Accessibility, a role in the city administration tasked with assisting in the creation and implementation of policies with older Cincinnatians and those with accessibility needs in mind. In November 2018, the Over-the-Rhine Senior Center – which primarily serves low-income, older residents in the neighborhoods in or near the area north of downtown called "Over-the-Rhine" – was set to close due to a reduction in funding. Sittenfeld worked with Cincinnati Area Senior Services, the Cincinnati Recreation Commission, and the Office of Aging and Accessibility, to direct city funding to keep the center operational. In January 2019, Sittenfeld advocated for the city's human services budget to incorporate resources for senior citizen services, which had not previously qualified for funding. The legislation adding senior services as a human services budget priority passed unanimously.

In 2020, Sittenfeld sponsored the first "renter's choice" legislation in the United States, allowing apartment-renting tenants alternatives to cash security deposit.

In 2019, working with the AMOS Project, the University of Cincinnati Law School, Northern Kentucky University Law School, and the Ohio Justice and Policy Center, Sittenfeld sponsored legislation ending the City of Cincinnati Law Department's prosecutorial division's policy of requesting cash bail when prosecuting defendants. Sittenfeld later introduced legislation allowing prospective job-applicants to the City of Cincinnati with prior marijuana possession charges on their records to not be denied employment. In 2020, with councilmember Greg Landsman, Sittenfeld introduced legislation to move toward a policy of citations to court, instead of arrests, for low level offenses.

Sittenfeld sponsored legislation creating Cincinnati's first-ever bus-only lane to provide dedicated avenues for Metro buses to traverse city streets, with an emphasis on the Central Business District, to reduce congestion and improve travel times. In 2019, Sittenfeld sponsored an amendment to the city charter which allowed for a regional funding mechanism for the Southwest Ohio Regional Transit Authority's Metro bus system, which previously had only received direct local funding from the city's earnings tax. Voters approved Sittenfeld's charter amendment with 75% support in the November 2018 election.

Beginning in 2017, Sittenfeld began an effort with councilmember Chris Seelbach to establish an annual commitment in the city's budget directing $500,000 toward city-wide pedestrian safety improvements. In 2019, that allocation funded 70 projects, such as enhanced lighting and signs, improved crosswalks, and "bump-outs" which reduce the width of streets at key, pedestrian-heavy intersections.

Sittenfeld sponsored city funding for a new health and wellness center in the neighborhood of Evanston, which serves immigrant students and families. He has also advocated for additional school nurses in the city budget.

Sittenfeld has advocated for reproductive rights. In April 2019, after the Ohio Senate passed Senate Bill 23, a bill which would ban abortions after the detection of a fetal heartbeat, Sittenfeld introduced legislation requiring the City of Cincinnati's law department to file an amicus curae brief with the court in opposition to the legislation, challenging the bill's constitutionality.

Sittenfeld has participated in efforts to convert Cincinnati into a smart city, including sponsoring legislation to create the city's open data portal, expanding wireless internet access to a low-income Cincinnati neighborhoods, creating the city's Government Technology Advisory Council, and calling for implementation of technology tools that can be deployed for public safety, such as ShotSpotter.

==== Texting scandal ====
In 2018, Sittenfeld was caught leading the "Gang of Five", a group of five city council members (Sittenfeld, Chris Seelbach, Greg Landsman, Wendell Young, and Tamaya Dennard) who communicated via secret text messages attempting to undermine the mayor and bypass public meetings and debates.

In March 2019, the Gang of Five agreed to turn over their text messages in order to settle a lawsuit filed by a local anti-tax activist. Among the text messages were juvenile discussions of city employees' sexuality, messages mocking members of the public who attended council meetings or contacted the city council. The text messages were made searchable and posted on the website of the law firm that brought the suit against the Gang of Five. The Agreed Judgment Entry resolving the case has been made available online at the Scribd website.

In June 2019 additional text messages were released as a result of a lawsuit filed by Sinclair Media reporter Angenette Levy in which it was revealed that Sittenfeld encouraged the then-city manager, Harry Black, to work with African American community leaders to avoid being fired. This release also included text messages in which Sittenfeld discussed his concern over Black's need for counseling, and Sittenfeld and other council members discussing Black's habit of making late night drunken phone calls to city officials and reporters. Text messages also revealed that Black had engaged in efforts to suppress dissent among city employees, including chastising a city employee after she testified before council about the death of a teenager when 911 operators and Cincinnati police were unable to locate the teen. Despite all these concerns, Sittenfeld opposed efforts to fire Black.

The Gang of Five's efforts cost the City approximately $500,000 as it resulted in additional costs to fire a city manager, and costs to hire outside lawyers to defend the lawsuit and ultimately in paying the fines and attorney fees as part of the agreed order resolving the lawsuit.

==== Arrest ====
On November 19, 2020, Sittenfeld was arrested by federal agents on charges of accepting bribes in exchange for favorable votes on developmental deals. Two other Cincinnati councilmembers, Tamaya Dennard and Jeff Pastor, were arrested under separate corruption charges earlier in the same year. On July 8, 2022, Sittenfeld was convicted on one count of bribery and one count attempted extortion, and was acquitted on two counts of honest services wire fraud, one count of bribery, and an additional count of attempted extortion. On October 10, 2023, he was sentenced to 16 months in prison.

The judge of the case received 185 letters from Sittenfeld's friends, family, politicians, and the local Jewish community, all in support of Sittenfeld.

As part of his sentence, Sittenfeld was additionally ordered to repay $20,000 of bribes received from undercover FBI agents posing as developers. His post-trial request to overturn the conviction was denied by the district court, as was his appeal to the Sixth Circuit in February 2025. Sittenfeld subsequently petitioned the Supreme Court for review, though it was never heard.

On May 29, 2025, he was granted a full pardon by President Donald Trump, vacating the conviction.

=== U.S. Senate campaign ===
On January 22, 2015, Sittenfeld announced his candidacy for the U.S. Senate seat held by previous Republican Senator Rob Portman in 2016. Sittenfeld lost in the Democratic Party primary to former Ohio Governor Ted Strickland.

Throughout his primary campaign, Sittenfeld focused heavily on gun control issues, saying he would support reforms such as a federal ban on assault weapons and more comprehensive background checks for gun purchasers. On January 28, 2016, Sittenfeld announced a proposed amendment to the Ohio legislature to restore home-rule authority on gun control. His proposal would allow city governments within Ohio to enact their own gun control laws, a power which was removed by a 2006 state law.

2016 U.S. Senate campaign endorsements

Individuals

- Eric Schmidt, executive chairman of Alphabet Inc. (parent company of Google)
- Heather Zichal, former Deputy Assistant to the President for Energy and Climate Change (2009–2013)
- Dick Celeste, 64th Governor of Ohio
- Thomas C. Sawyer, Ohio State Senator
- Emilia Sykes, member of the Ohio House of Representatives
- Tracy Maxwell Heard, former Ohio House of Representatives majority leader
- Dan Horrigan, mayor of Akron
- Mark Mallory, former mayor of Cincinnati
- David Mann, Cincinnati city councilman and former mayor of Cincinnati
- Chris Seelbach, Cincinnati city councilman
- Yvette Simpson, Cincinnati city councilwoman
- Wendell Young, Cincinnati city councilman
- Eileen Shapiro, Summit County Council president
- Russ Pry, Summit County executive
- Jim Ruvolo, former chair of the Ohio Democratic Party
- Jonathan Banks, actor
- Mark Hamill, actor

Organizations

- Friends of the Earth Action
- Akron Beacon Journal
- The Plain Dealer / Cleveland.com

=== Mayoral campaign ===
On July 12, 2020, Sittenfeld announced that he was running in the 2021 Cincinnati mayoral election to succeed incumbent mayor John Cranley. He faced another city councilman, David S. Mann.

Sittenfield stopped being an active candidate for the mayoral race due to the federal charges brought against him.

== Writing career ==
Sittenfeld is now a freelance writer. In 2026, he wrote an opinion piece in The New York Times entitled "Finding Community in Prison", describes how falling from being an Ivy League grad to an inmate serving time in federal prison "expanded my social circle".

He is currently working on a memoir.

== Personal life ==
In June 2016, he married Sarah Coyne, who is a medical doctor. They have a two sons.

== See also ==
- List of people granted executive clemency in the second Trump presidency
