= Pride and Prejudice =

1813 novel by Jane Austen

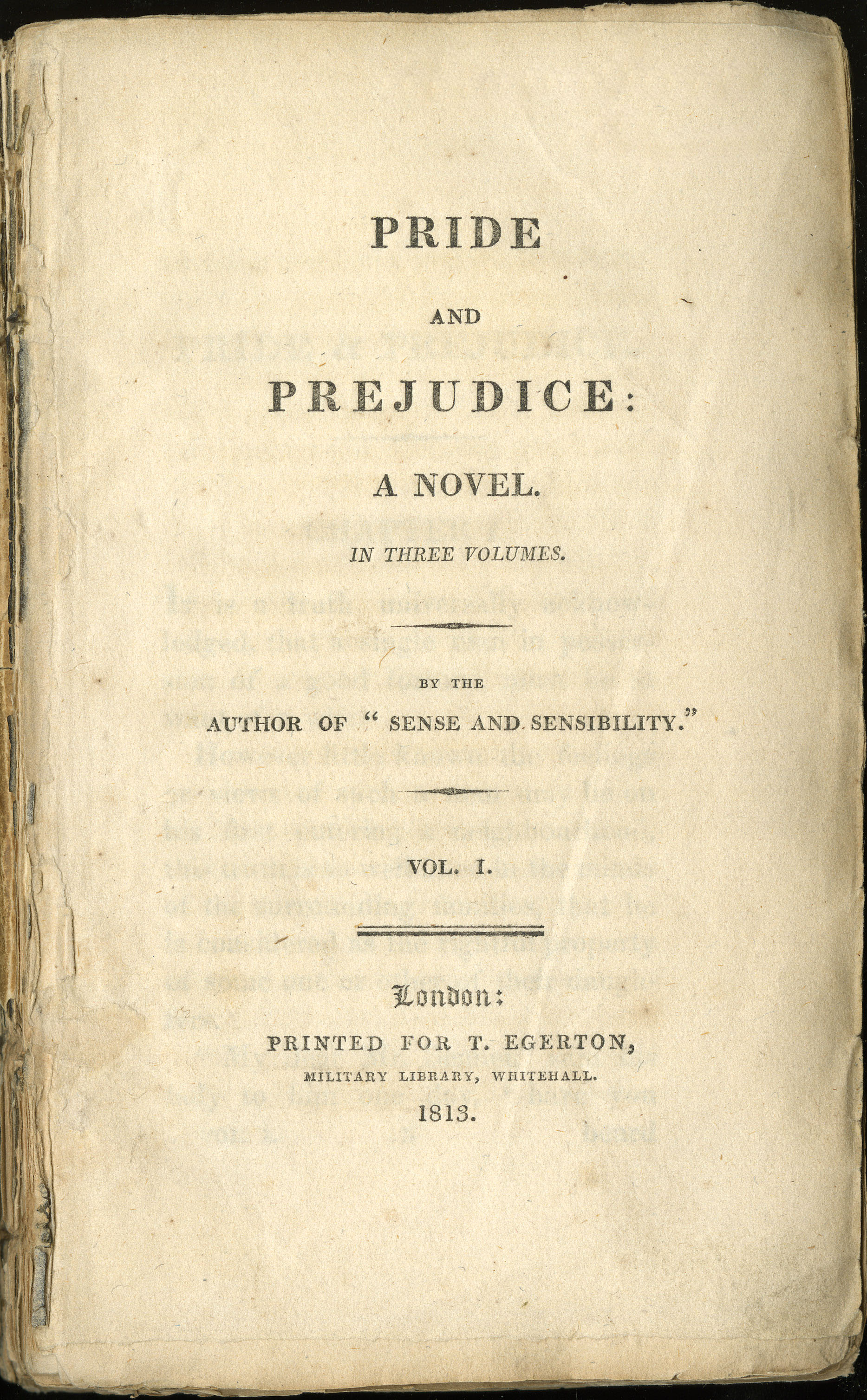
- Title page of the first edition, 1813
- Author: Jane Austen
- Working title: First Impressions
- Language: English
- Genre: Classic Regency novel Romance novel
- Set in: Hertfordshire; Derbyshire; Kent; London
- Publisher: T. Egerton, Whitehall
- Publication date: 28 January 1813
- Publication place: United Kingdom
- Media type: Print (hardback, 3 volumes), digitalized
- OCLC: 38659585
- Dewey Decimal: 823.7
- LC Class: PR4034 .P7
- Text: Pride and Prejudice at Wikisource

LibriVox recording by Karen Savage.

Pride and Prejudice is a novel by English author Jane Austen. Written when she was aged 20–21, it was her third novel written and became the second to see print when it was published in 1813. A novel of manners, it follows the character development of Elizabeth Bennet, the protagonist of the book, who learns about the repercussions of hasty judgments and comes to appreciate the difference between superficial goodness and actual goodness.

Her father, Mr Bennet—owner of the Longbourn estate in Hertfordshire—has five daughters; but this estate is entailed and so can only be inherited in the male line. To his regret, he has failed to save out of the income from the Longbourn estate to provide for his daughters. From the Bennets' perspective, it is imperative that at least one of their daughters marry well to support the others, which is a primary motivation driving the plot.

Pride and Prejudice has consistently appeared near the top of lists of "most-loved books" among literary scholars and the reading public. It has become one of the most popular novels in English literature, with over 20 million copies sold, and has inspired many derivatives in modern literature. For more than a century, dramatic adaptations, reprints, unofficial sequels, films, and TV versions of Pride and Prejudice have portrayed the characters and themes of the novel, reaching mass audiences.

== Plot summary ==
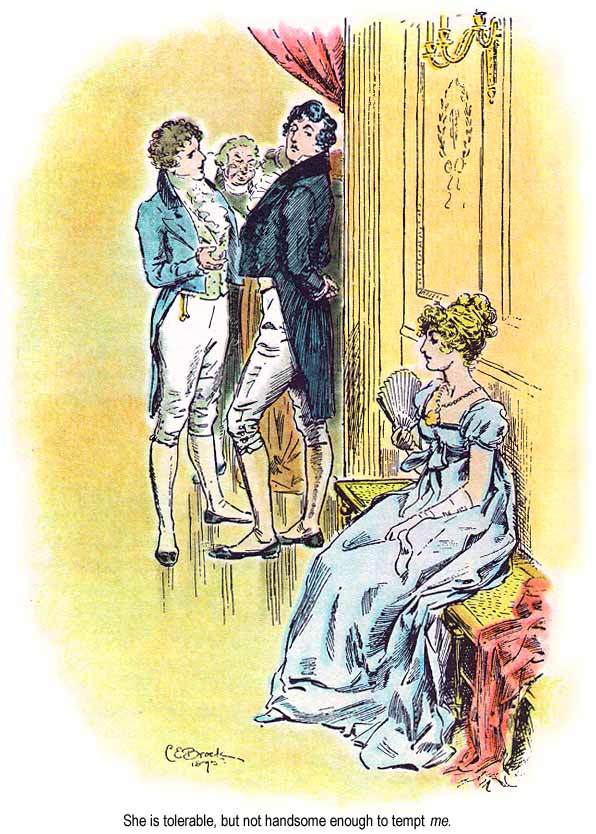
Mr Darcy says Elizabeth is "not handsome enough to tempt him" to dance. (Artist: C.E. Brock, 1895)

In the early 19th century, the Bennet family lives at their Longbourn estate, situated near the small town of Meryton in Hertfordshire, England. Mrs Bennet's greatest desire is to marry off her five daughters to secure their futures. A regiment of militia is encamped outside the town, and the younger Bennet daughters flirt with the officers, to the great embarrassment of their elder sisters.

The arrival of Mr Bingley, a rich bachelor who rents the neighbouring Netherfield estate, gives Mrs. Bennet hope that one of her daughters might contract a marriage to their advantage. Soon, the family is introduced to the Netherfield party: Mr Bingley; his sisters and brother-in-law; and his closest friend Mr Darcy. Mr Bingley appears interested in Jane. Mr. Darcy declines to dance with Elizabeth, as she is "not handsome enough." Although she jokes about it, Elizabeth is deeply offended. Despite this, Mr Darcy secretly finds himself drawn to Elizabeth as they continue to encounter each other at social events, appreciating her wit and frankness.

Mr Collins, a recently ordained clergyman and (as a distant cousin) the heir to the Longbourn estate, which is entailed away from the daughters, visits the Bennet family. He intends to marry one of the Bennet girls on the advice of his patroness Lady Catherine de Bourgh, who is also Mr Darcy's aunt. He decides to pursue Elizabeth. The Bennet family meets the charming militia officer George Wickham, who tells Elizabeth that Mr Darcy had treated him badly in the past. Elizabeth's prejudice against Mr Darcy and admiration for Wickham lead her to believe him. Elizabeth rejects Mr Collins's marriage proposal, and Mr Collins subsequently proposes to Charlotte Lucas, a friend of Elizabeth's, and is accepted. Convinced that Jane is an unsuitable match for his friend, Mr Darcy prompts Mr Bingley to leave for London and to never return to Netherfield. Jane is heartbroken, while Elizabeth's hatred for Mr Darcy grows, as she correctly suspects he was responsible for Mr Bingley's departure.

In the spring, Elizabeth visits Charlotte and Mr Collins in Kent. Elizabeth and her hosts are invited to Rosings Park, where Mr Darcy and his cousin Colonel Fitzwilliam are also visiting. Fitzwilliam unknowingly confirms Elizabeth's suspicion that Mr Darcy had intentionally separated Bingley and Jane. Mr Darcy proposes to Elizabeth, declaring his love for her despite her social status. She is shocked and rejects him angrily, saying that she could never love a man who caused her sister such unhappiness; she further accuses him of treating Wickham unjustly. Darcy admits to separating Bingley and Jane but dismisses the accusation regarding Wickham. The next day, Mr Darcy gives Elizabeth a letter explaining his history with Wickham, which contradicts Wickham's earlier assertions about their relationship and paints Wickham as profligate and predatory to young women. Darcy explains but does not apologize for his efforts to separate Bingley and Jane, whom he believed indifferent to his friend. Though Elizabeth knew her sister was deeply in love, the letter convinces her that Darcy is a good, though proud, man and she had been unfair to him about Wickham.

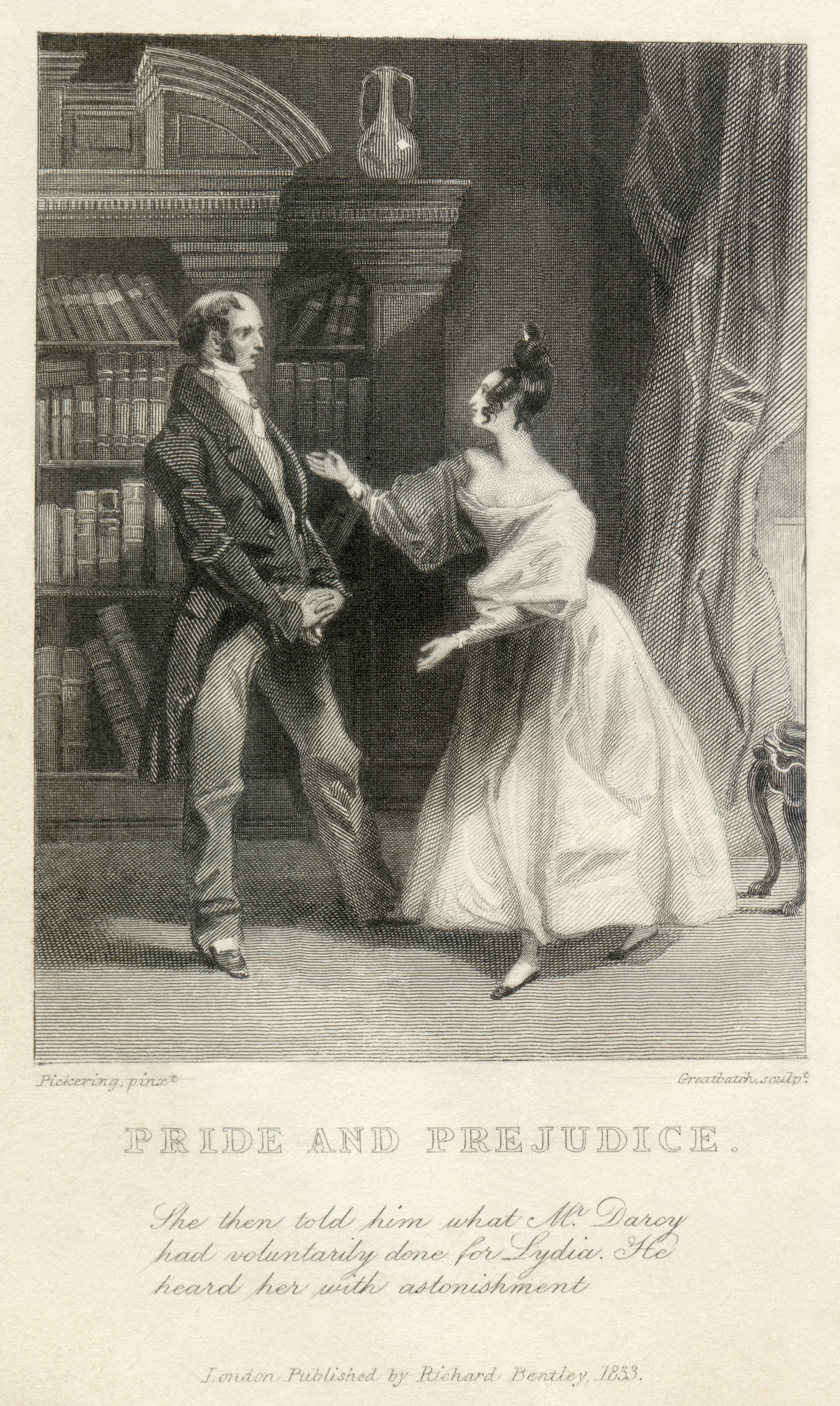
Elizabeth tells her father that Darcy united Lydia and Wickham – one of the two earliest illustrations of Pride and Prejudice. The fashions reflect the engraving date (1830s), not the period of the novel.

Months later, Elizabeth accompanies her aunt and uncle, Mr and Mrs Gardiner, on a tour of Derbyshire, where they meet Mr Darcy unexpectedly on his grand estate. He is exceedingly gracious to Elizabeth and the Gardiners, winning Elizabeth's good opinion. There, she receives news that her sister Lydia has run off with Wickham, which she tells Mr Darcy. The errant couple is eventually tracked down in London. At last, Wickham agrees to marry Lydia; the Bennets assume that Mr Gardiner has paid him off. But when Lydia and Wickham, now married, visit the Bennet family at Longbourn, Lydia accidentally reveals that Mr Darcy was at her wedding. Elizabeth writes to Aunt Gardiner for further information, and Mrs Gardiner reveals that Mr Darcy secretly secured the match at great expense and trouble to himself.

Mr Bingley and Mr Darcy return to Netherfield. Jane accepts Mr Bingley's proposal. A week later, Lady Catherine, having heard that Elizabeth and Mr Darcy intend to marry, visits Elizabeth and demands she promise never to accept Mr Darcy's proposal. While admitting that she and Mr Darcy are not engaged, Elizabeth refuses to make such a promise. When Darcy returns to Netherfield, Elizabeth reveals that she knows his part in Lydia's marriage and offers him her thanks; Darcy, having heard from his aunt about Elizabeth's refusal to reject him, again proposes marriage and is accepted.

== Characters ==
Character genealogy

Mr. Hurst
Mrs. Louisa Hurst
Mr. Philips
Caroline Bingley
Mrs. Philips
Mr. Charles Bingley
Mrs. Gardiner
Jane Bennet
Mr. Edward Gardiner
Elizabeth Bennet
Mrs. Bennet
Mary Bennet
Mr. Bennet
Catherine "Kitty" Bennet
Mr. William Collins
Lydia Bennet
Charlotte Lucas
Mr. George Wickham
(Old) Mr. Darcy	Mr. Fitzwilliam Darcy
Lady Anne Darcy	Georgiana Darcy
Lady Catherine de Bourgh	Anne de Bourgh
(Fitzwilliam Darcy)	Colonel Fitzwilliam

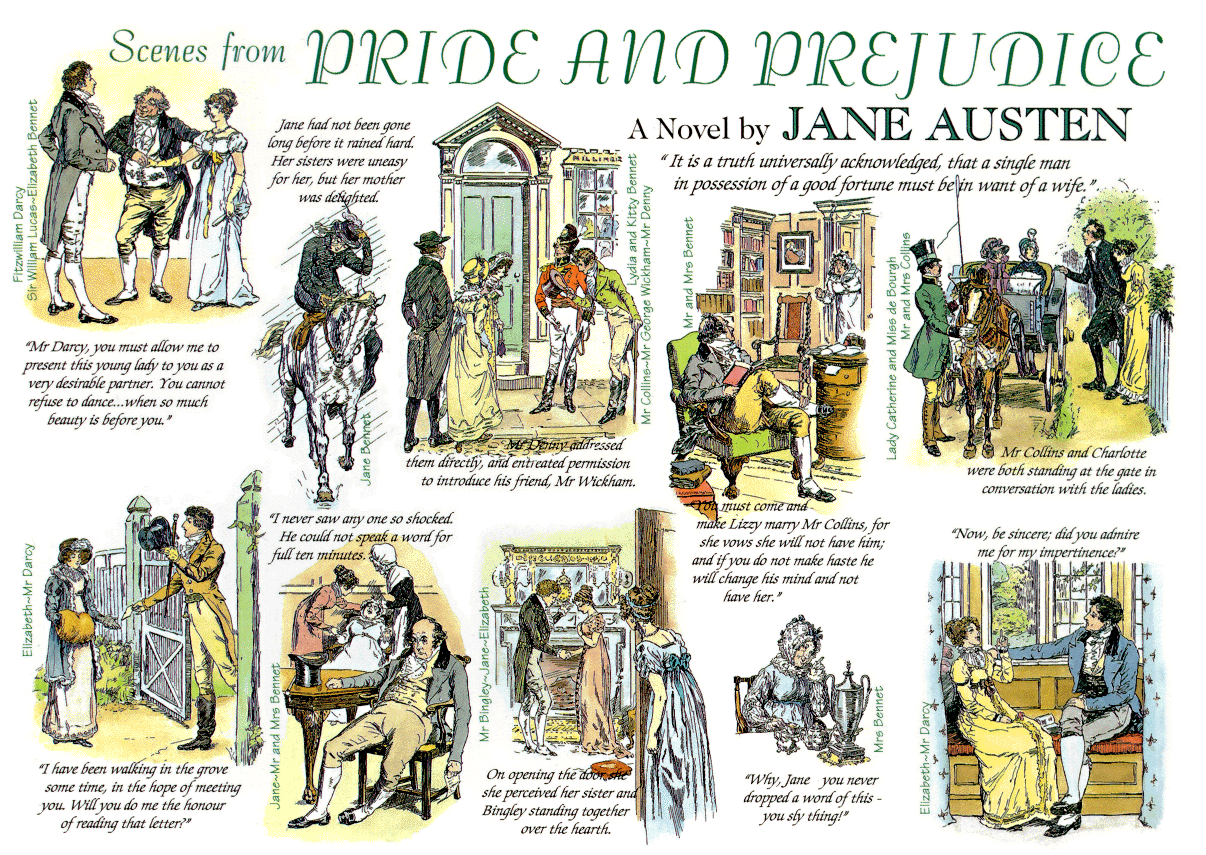
Scenes from Pride and Prejudice, by C. E. Brock (c. 1885)

- Elizabeth Bennet – the second-eldest of the Bennet daughters, she is attractive, witty and intelligent – but with a tendency to form tenacious and prejudiced first impressions. As the story progresses, so does her tumultuous relationship with Mr Darcy. The course of Elizabeth and Darcy's relationship is ultimately decided when Darcy overcomes his pride, and Elizabeth overcomes her prejudice, leading them both to surrender to their love for each other.
- Mr Fitzwilliam Darcy – Mr Bingley's friend and owner of the Darcy family seat of Pemberley in Derbyshire, said to be worth at least £10,000 a year. Although he is handsome, tall, and intelligent, Darcy lacks ease and social graces, so others frequently mistake his initially haughty reserve as proof of excessive pride. A new visitor to the Meryton setting of the novel, he is ultimately Elizabeth Bennet's love interest. Though he appears to be proud and is frequently disliked at first impression for this reason, his servants vouch for his kindness and decency.
- Mr Bennet – A logical and reasonable middle-aged landed gentleman of a more modest income of £2,000 per annum, and the dryly sarcastic patriarch of the Bennet family, with five unmarried daughters. His estate, Longbourn, is entailed to the male line. His affection for his wife wore off early in their marriage and is now reduced to mere toleration. He is often described as 'indolent' in the novel. He favors Elizabeth, finding her and Jane to be the most sensible of the household. His detachment from the actions of his wife and younger daughters, and disinclination to impose economy on their spendthrift ways, is the ultimate cause of their current predicament; he knows this, and increasingly regrets it, but does nothing about it.
- Mrs Bennet (née Gardiner) – the early middle-aged wife of Mr Bennet, and the mother of their five daughters. Mrs Bennet is a hypochondriac who imagines herself susceptible to attacks of tremors and palpitations (her "poor nerves") whenever things are not going her way. She is silly, frivolous, and tactless, and is given to embarrassing her husband and older daughters with a casual disregard for conventions of property, responsibility or propriety. Her main ambition in life is to marry her daughters off to wealthy men, as they will receive very little inheritance on the death of their father. She received a dowry of £5,000 from her father, which is settled as providing her with a lifetime allowance of 'pin money' and as marriage portions for her daughters after her death. Beautiful Jane and lively Lydia are her favorite daughters, but her overindulgence of Lydia's headstrong ways lead her into danger.

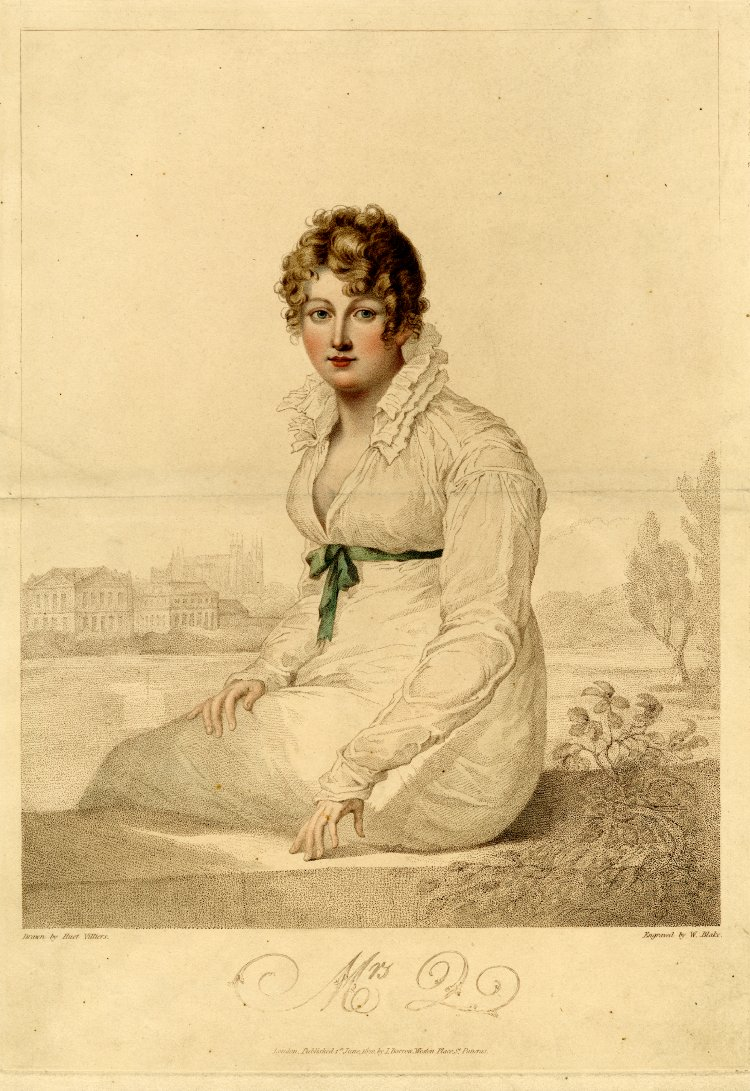
In a letter to Cassandra dated May 1813, Jane Austen describes a picture she saw at a gallery which was a good likeness of "Mrs Bingley" – Jane Bennet. Deirdre Le Faye in The World of Her Novels suggests that "Portrait of Mrs Q" is the picture Austen was referring to. (pp. 201–203)

- Jane Bennet – the eldest Bennet sister. She is considered the most beautiful young lady in the neighbourhood and is inclined to see only the good in others (but can be persuaded otherwise on sufficient evidence). She falls in love with Charles Bingley, a rich young man recently moved to Hertfordshire and a close friend of Mr Darcy.
- Mary Bennet – the middle Bennet sister, and the plainest of her siblings. Mary has a serious disposition and mostly reads and plays music, although she is often impatient to display her accomplishments and is rather vain about them. She frequently moralises to her family.
- Catherine "Kitty" Bennet – the fourth Bennet daughter. Though older than Lydia, she is her shadow and follows her in her pursuit of the officers of the militia. She is often portrayed as envious of Lydia and is described as a "silly" and "irritable" young woman. However, it is said that she improved when removed from Lydia's influence.
- Lydia Bennet – the youngest Bennet sister. She is frivolous, headstrong, irresponsible, and spoiled, and is her mother's favorite. Her main activity in life is socialising, especially flirting with the officers of the militia. This leads to her running off with George Wickham, although he has no intention of marrying her. Lydia shows no regard for the moral code of her society; as Ashley Tauchert says, she "feels without reasoning". Mr Darcy settles on her a 'separate estate' of £1,000 at her eventual wedding to Wickham.

- Charles Bingley – a handsome, amiable, and wealthy young man who leases Netherfield Park with hopes of purchasing it. Though genial and well-mannered, he is easily influenced by his friend Mr Darcy and his sisters' opinions, which leads to the disruption of his romance with Jane Bennet. His inherited fortune of £100,000 is derived from "trade" rather than landed wealth.

- Caroline Bingley – the snobbish sister of Charles Bingley, with an inheritance of her own of £20,000. She harbours designs on Mr Darcy and is jealous of his growing attachment to Elizabeth. She also disapproves of her brother's admiration for Jane Bennet and is disdainful of Meryton society, driven by her vanity and desire for social elevation.
- George Wickham – Wickham is a charming but reprehensible cad. He has been acquainted with Mr Darcy since infancy, being the son of Mr Darcy's father's steward. An officer in the militia, he is superficially charming and rapidly forms an attachment with Elizabeth Bennet. He later runs off with Lydia with no intention of marriage, which would have resulted in her and her family's complete disgrace. Darcy intervenes and bribes Wickham to marry her by paying off his immediate debts and purchasing him a commission in the infantry.
- Mr William Collins – Mr Collins is Mr Bennet's distant cousin, a clergyman and rector of Hunsford in Kent; and the current heir of the Longbourn estate. He is an obsequious, sanctimonious and pompous man, prone to making long and tedious speeches, who is excessively devoted to his patroness and neighbour, Lady Catherine de Bourgh, and regularly dines with her at Rosings - a fact he mentions frequently.
- Lady Catherine de Bourgh – the overbearing aunt of Mr Darcy. Lady Catherine is the wealthy widow of Sir Lewis de Bourgh of Rosings Park, where she resides with her daughter Anne, who has inherited her father's estate which unusually is not entailed in the male line. She meddles improperly in the business of the Overseers of the Poor and Justices of the Peace, is haughty, hectoring, pompous, domineering, and condescending, and has long planned to marry off her daughter, Anne, to Darcy to 'unite the two estates', claiming it was the dearest wish of both her and her late sister, Lady Anne Darcy (née Fitzwilliam).

- Mr Edward Gardiner and Mrs Gardiner – Edward Gardiner is Mrs Bennet's brother and a successful, sensible London tradesman. Aunt Gardiner is wise and insightful and is close to her nieces Jane and Elizabeth. The Gardiners are the parents of four children. They host the marriage of Lydia with Wickham from their home in Gracechurch Street, and are instrumental in bringing about the marriage between Darcy and Elizabeth.

- Georgiana Darcy – Georgiana is Mr Darcy's quiet, amiable and shy younger sister, with a settled dowry of £30,000 from the Pemberley estate, who is 16 when the story begins. When still 15, Miss Darcy almost eloped with Mr Wickham but was saved by her brother, whom she idolises. Thanks to years of tutelage under masters, she is accomplished at the piano, singing, playing the harp, drawing, and modern languages and is therefore described as Caroline Bingley's idea of an "accomplished woman".

- Charlotte Lucas – Elizabeth's 27-year-old friend. She marries Mr Collins for financial security, fearing becoming a burden to her family. Austen uses Charlotte's decision to illustrate how women of the time often married out of convenience or necessity rather than love, without condemning her choice. Charlotte is the daughter of Sir William Lucas and Lady Lucas, neighbours of the Bennet family.

- Colonel Fitzwilliam – Colonel Fitzwilliam is the younger son of an earl and the nephew of Lady Catherine de Bourgh and Lady Anne Darcy; this makes him the cousin of Anne de Bourgh and the Darcy siblings, Fitzwilliam and Georgiana. He is about 30 years old at the beginning of the novel. He is the coguardian of Miss Georgiana Darcy, along with his cousin, Mr Darcy. According to Colonel Fitzwilliam, as a younger son, he cannot marry without thought to his prospective bride's dowry.
Diagram showing relationships among the principal characters of Pride and Prejudice

== Major themes ==
A theme in much of Austen's work is the importance of environment and upbringing in developing young people's character and morality. Social standing and wealth are not necessarily advantages in her works, and a further theme common to Austen's work is ineffectual parents. In Pride and Prejudice, the failure of Mr and Mrs Bennet as parents is blamed for Lydia's lack of moral judgment. Darcy has been taught to be principled and scrupulously honourable, but he is also proud and overbearing. Kitty, rescued from Lydia's bad influence and spending more time with her older sisters after they marry, is said to improve greatly in their superior society.

The American novelist Anna Quindlen observed in an introduction to an edition of Austen's novel in 1995:

Pride and Prejudice is also about that thing that all great novels consider, the search for self. And it is the first great novel that teaches us this search is as surely undertaken in the drawing room, making small talk as in the pursuit of a great white whale or the public punishment of adultery.

=== Title ===
Many critics take the title as the start when analysing the themes of Pride and Prejudice but Robert Fox cautions against reading too much into the title (which was initially First Impressions), because commercial factors may have played a role in its selection. "After the success of Sense and Sensibility, nothing would have seemed more natural than to bring out another novel of the same author using again the formula of antithesis and alliteration for the title."

The qualities of the title are not exclusively assigned to one or the other of the protagonists; both Elizabeth and Darcy display pride and prejudice." The phrase "pride and prejudice" had been used over the preceding two centuries by Joseph Hall, Jeremy Taylor, Joseph Addison and Samuel Johnson. Austen is thought to have taken her title from a passage in Fanny Burney's Cecilia (1782), a novel she is known to have admired:

"The whole of this unfortunate business," said Dr. Lyster, "has been the result of PRIDE and PREJUDICE. ... if to PRIDE and PREJUDICE you owe your miseries, so wonderfully is good and evil balanced, that to PRIDE and PREJUDICE you will also owe their termination." (capitalisation as in the original)

=== Marriage and the family name ===
The opening line of the novel announces: "It is a truth universally acknowledged, that a single man in possession of a good fortune, must be in want of a wife." This sets marriage as a motif and a central idea in the novel. Readers are poised to question whether or not these single men need a wife, and what for; or if the need is dictated by the "neighbourhood" families and their daughters who require a "good fortune". According to American Book Review the opening line of Pride and Prejudice is considered second on their list of top 100 greatest opening lines in English literature after Moby Dick's "Call me Ishmael".

Marriage is a complex social activity that takes political, social, and economic factors into account. In the case of Charlotte Lucas, the seeming success of her marriage to Mr Collins lies in the comfortable financial circumstances of their household rather than in mutual respect or companionship; while the relationship between Mr and Mrs Bennet serves to illustrate bad marriages based on an impulsive attraction and surface over substance (economic, social and psychological). The Bennets' marriage turns out to be deeply dysfunctional in failing to meet one of a propertied family's most basic requirements: that of providing their daughters with marriage settlements appropriate for a gentleman's children. This increasingly humiliates Mr Bennet in the course of the book, made worse by Mrs Bennet's blithe unconcern at relying on other families' money instead, and her total disregard of any requirement for these obligations to be repaid. As is conventional in a romantic novel, the eventual marriages of Jane and Elizabeth as main protagonists are presented as a happy-ever-after. But otherwise, marriages in Austen's fiction are realistic and compromised; if anything, the "sad omens" for the Bennets' marriage are now worse.

The Bennets' failing marriage is an example that the youngest Bennet, Lydia, re-enacts with Wickham, and the results are far from felicitous. Indeed, the married Lydia rapidly adopts her mother's mercenary attitudes. Although the central characters, Elizabeth and Darcy, begin the novel as hostile acquaintances and unlikely friends, they eventually work toward a better understanding of themselves and each other, which frees them to truly fall in love. But this only occurs after they have both painfully confronted a complex of economic obligations and dependencies around one another, into which they have been precipitated by their families' circumstances. From the outset, both have determined to marry only on their own terms, recognising that this may be contrary to the wishes of their parents, but both also remain bound within their families and must be ready to trust one another openly with these family concerns. This does not eliminate the challenges of the real differences in their technically equivalent social status as land-owning gentry and their female relations. It does, however, provide them with a better understanding of each other's point of view from the different ends of the rather wide scale of differences within that category.

When Elizabeth rejects Darcy's first proposal, the argument of marrying for love is introduced. Elizabeth accepts Darcy's proposal only when she is certain she loves him and her feelings are reciprocated. Austen's complex sketching of different marriages ultimately allows readers to question what forms of alliance are desirable, especially when it comes to privileging economic, sexual, or companionate attraction.

It is a common assumption of all parties in the novel that the primary necessity for the marriage of a man of good fortune is to maintain and perpetuate his family name through his offspring. Equally, that one necessity for the marriage of a woman of property is to maintain that property for her offspring in her new family name. Although both Elizabeth and Darcy have already determined to marry for love, both recognise that they also have obligations in marriage to their family names and landed estates. Elizabeth is determined that she will marry a 'gentleman', knowing that her marriage otherwise would sully the Bennet family name, and potentially constrain the inheritance of her future offspring; Darcy already feels committed to contracting a marriage to provide an heir and mistress for the Pemberley estate, and to continue the Darcy family name. Counterpart pressures, to maintain ancient family names and to preserve landed estates in that name through male inheritance, are operating everywhere across England amongst the social circles in which the novel takes place. Everywhere too, these social pressures are having to be balanced against an increasing recognition of individual aspirations in marriage; to enable heirs to choose companionable partners, to provide for the futures of daughters and younger sons and enable these to marry in their turn, to allow younger sons to be educated and to embark on careers of 'gentlemanlike' quality, and to provide for widows and unmarried daughters.

The novel is concerned with the marital prospects of the heirs of three historic landed estates: Longbourn, represented by five daughters; Pemberley, represented by a son and daughter; and Rosings Park, represented by a single (and no longer young) daughter. Only one of these appears assured of male succession in the family name. This prospect of the failure of male succession had become a common theme across rural England in the 18th century, arising in almost all family estates at one time or another; and in response to this, landowners and their lawyers had developed legal instruments - entail and strict settlement - to balance the consequential conflicts of interest. To be sufficiently confident of producing a son to maintain an estate in the family name, it was better if an heir did not need to wait for their father's death before marrying; but there must then be provision for an assured and substantial income from the estate to that heir during their father's life to be committed in a legal marriage settlement. In order to ensure that inheritance of the estate could be maintained in the family, even were a future heir to produce no sons, there must be provision for portions from the estate to be paid for current younger sons' educations and marriages into 'gentlemanlike' careers in the Army, Church and Law, so that these sons might raise gentlemanly cousins within the family who might if needed, continue succession of the estate in the family name. In order to ensure that daughters from the family could marry gentlemen, they must be provided with settled dowries from the estate to commit to their legal marriage settlement. Provisions in all these forms would commonly be expected to be spelled out in the strict settlement that each heir would enter into on coming of age. Technically, the entail was a trust, so that the entailed estate would be held by trustees (commonly the family's lawyers) to the benefit of the 'tenant in tail', the heir's unborn eldest son. The heir would now be a 'tenant for life' in receipt of an annual allowance. Once the heir's father died, his son would become 'tenant in possession' with full access to the income from the estate, but unable to sell or mortgage any part of it. Payments due under the settlement - such as settled dowries - would be made by the trustees; though in the case of Longbourn, it appears that no provision had been made in Mr Bennet's strict settlement for daughters' dowries, Mrs Bennet's own dowry of £5,000 being settled for this purpose instead. Mrs Bennet rails repeatedly at the unfairness of the Longbourn entail; unable to realise, though her older daughters do, that it was only through that entail that she and Mr Bennet could have married as young as they did.

Of the other two landed estates that figure in the novel, Rosings Park and Pemberley, the reader is to understand that Pemberley is also entailed with a strict settlement, as Georgiana Darcy is stated as being provided with a settled dowry of £30,000 from it. In respect of Rosings, Lady Catherine states that it is not entailed away from the female line; "it was not thought necessary in Sir Lewis de Bourgh's family"; though this statement prompts the likelihood that the Rosings estate nevertheless is entailed by strict settlement in the de Bourgh family to the direct descendants of an ancient forbear, though not specifying 'male' or 'female'. Anne de Bourgh is identified by Mr Collins as "the heiress of Rosings", indicating a female inheritance that has already happened. Consequently, if the estate is entailed, then it may be inferred that the current 'tenant in possession' and owner of the Rosings estate, is Lady Anne de Bourgh; and that Anne's yet unborn heir would 'tenant in tail'. This would explain why it would be necessary for Mr Darcy and Lady Anne to marry if the two ancient estates are to be united in their children. But in any case, assuming Mr Collins is correct, Lady Catherine cannot be the current owner of Rosings. Under all the bluster of Lady Catherine's outburst to Elizabeth in the garden at Longbourn, the reality is that Lady Catherine has been scheming to detach Rosings Park from a branch of the ancient de Bourgh family and convey it into a branch of the Darcy family. Which is precisely the sort of dynastic larceny by marriage that the legal institutions of marriage in the English landed gentry in this period sought to forestall.

If entail and strict settlement tended only to be undertaken in respect of larger landed estates; dowries and associated marriage settlements, in the levels of English society represented in the novel, were effectively universal. Amy Erickson has demonstrated that in more than 10% of marriages, as found in probate accounts for married men of all classes, some sort of marriage settlement sum is referenced which is bound to be repaid to the widow by the executors of the husband's will. Even humble marriages might well be covered by a simple bond for repayment, and around a quarter were for less than £13. But in the families with any degree of land or property, dowries for daughters were expected to be considerably larger—£500 and upwards—and would commonly be incorporated into a formal marriage settlement applying the legal principle of 'separate estate'. The Dowry sum would not be paid directly to the couple (as by the Common Law doctrine of 'coverture' it would have then become the outright property of the husband), instead it was held by trustees in trust for the future children of the marriage. The marriage settlement would specify payments from this settled fund out of its income without drawing on the capital, typically including, 'pin money', annual payments to the wife during the marriage of money to be spent at her own discretion on non-essentials and clothing; and 'jointure', eventual annual payments to support the living costs of the wife as an unmarried widow. Once both the married couple had died, the capital fund would be shared out to any surviving offspring in proportions to be determined, commonly by the wife's will. Income from the fund during the marriage after payment of 'pin money' might be allowed to be available from her to the husband (with the approval of the trustees); but he could not touch the capital—most usually held in interest-bearing securities. Should the wife inherit further money during the marriage, the testator—for instance, her own parents—could specify that inheritance as being into the 'separate estate', rather than to the couple directly. By securing substantial dowries and inheritances through marriage settlements as 'separate estates' the fathers of marriageable daughters sought to ensure that they continued to be able to maintain themselves and their children in presentable attire for polite company, even were their husband to turn out as irresponsible with his own money; that the daughter would be assured of a sustainable living in widowhood; and that eventually the settled property would pass to her offspring.

Unmarried girls in these levels of society were commonly already known as having been provided by their family with a particular value of dowry in 'separate estate'; and it is a tacit rebuke to Mr and Mrs Bennet that they have failed properly to do so. Mrs Bennet blames the entail, but the real cause is their own improvidence over the years. It was not uncommon for the groom's family, before the marriage, to increase the bride's separate estate and pin money; but the manner by which Mrs Bennet continues openly assuming that Darcy and Bingley will do so for her and her daughters, is vulgar, demeans the honour of the Bennet family name, and leaves Mr Bennet both angered and ashamed.

=== Wealth ===
Wealth is a strong theme in the novel where the male characters of marrying age are usually described, first and foremost, by their annual income. For example, Mr Bingley is introduced as a 4000 pounds-a-year person, similar to the initial mentions of Mr Darcy and Colonel Fitzwilliam.

Money plays a fundamental role in the marriage market for the young ladies seeking a well-off husband and for men who wish to marry a woman of means. George Wickham tries to elope with Georgiana Darcy for her settled dowry, and Colonel Fitzwilliam states that he will marry someone with wealth.

Marrying a woman of a rich family also ensured a linkage to a higher-class family, as is visible in the desires of Bingley's sisters to have their brother married to Georgiana Darcy. Mrs Bennet is frequently seen encouraging her daughters to marry a wealthy man of high social class. In chapter 1, when Mr Bingley arrives, she is "thinking of his marrying one of them".

Inheritance of landed wealth was by descent but could be further restricted by entailment, which in the case of the Longbourn estate restricted inheritance to male heirs only; Mr Collins was to inherit the family estate upon Mr Bennet's death in default of there being a son. His proposal to Elizabeth would have ensured her security; but she refuses his offer. The procedure of entail ensured that family estates of ancient creation were very rarely sold outright, typically passing instead to another branch of the same family where there was no male heir, or where the estate had fallen heavily in debt. Recently created estates were much more likely to come onto the market.

Inheritance laws benefited males both through entail and because, through the doctrine of coverture, married women had severely constricted independent legal rights in Common Law - especially to any landed property they brought into the marriage - until the second half of the 19th century. For the upper-middle and aristocratic classes, marriage to a man with a reliable income was almost the only route to security for the woman and the children she was to have. The irony of the opening line is that generally within this society it would be a single woman without a good fortune who must be in want of a wealthy husband, to have a secure life and children. Against this however, the Common Law of England provided almost unrestricted economic freedom for those unmarried women who had nevertheless inherited substantial property - as Anne de Bourgh and Caroline Bingley have done, and Georgiana Darcy will do when she comes of age. "English property law was distinctive in two respects: first, married women under coverture were even more restricted than in the rest of Europe; second, single women enjoyed a position unique in Europe as legal individuals in their own right, with no requirement for a male guardian". As a 'feme sole' the legal status of an unmarried woman or widow in England did not differ from that of a man. Consequently, when propertied women married, and especially when widows remarried, it was standard practice in this period for their assets to be placed in trust before the marriage in a 'separate estate' to which their husband would have no legal right of access.

Differing levels of wealth amongst the country gentry are observed in the three rural counties in which the action of the book takes place. Kent, the location of Hunsford and Rosings Park and an area Austen knew well in visiting her brother's estate at Godmersham Park, was favoured by prosperous families from the City of London as a county where recently wealthy men might buy a landed estate and establish themselves as gentlemen. In the novel, the style of living in these Kent households is noted as being beyond the social range of the characters from Hertfordshire. Hertfordshire in this period, similarly attracted numbers of socially aspiring men from London - as with Mr Bingley - but generally at a lesser degree of wealth and less extravagant living style. Whereas in Kent and Hertfordshire there is a considerable turnover for families buying and selling estates, this is not the case in Derbyshire, where the Darcy family has held the estate of Pemberley for generations. Similarly almost all estates around Derbyshire will have remained under the same family name throughout periods of relative affluence and austerity, although the Bingleys will eventually purchase a family estate in a neighbouring county.

=== Class ===
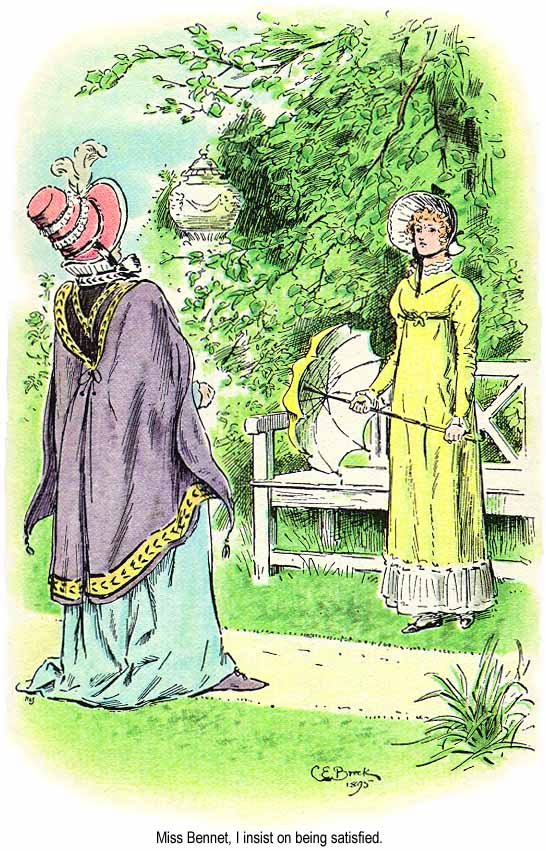
Lady Catherine and Elizabeth by C. E. Brock, 1895

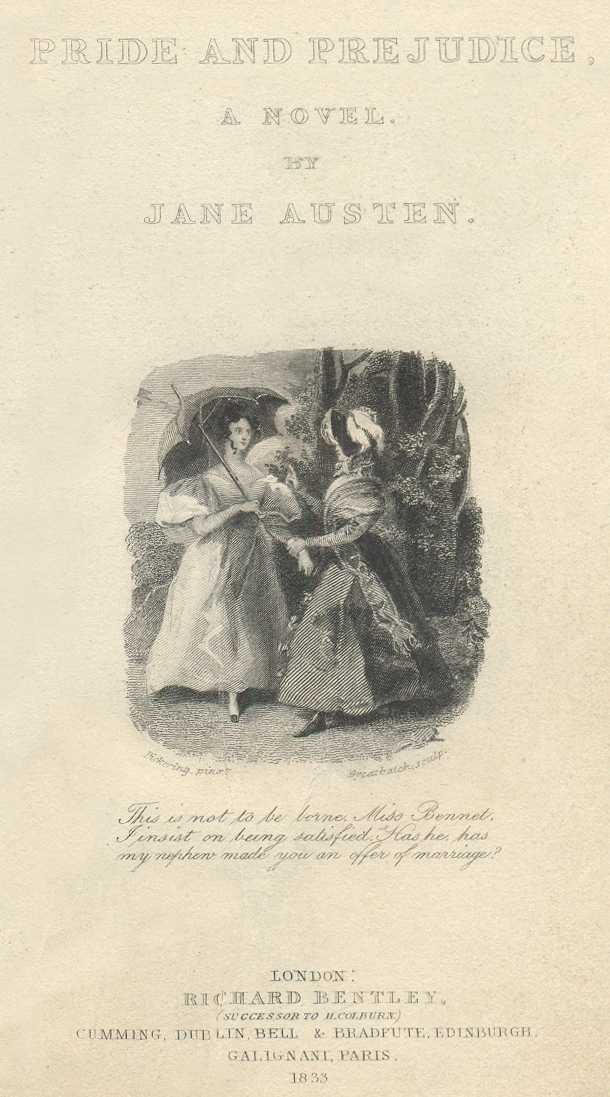
Lady Catherine confronts Elizabeth about Darcy, on the title page of the first illustrated edition. This is the other of the first two illustrations of the novel.

Austen might now be known for her "romances," but the marriages in her novels engage with economics and class distinctions. Pride and Prejudice is no exception.

When Darcy proposes to Elizabeth, he cites their economic and social differences as obstacles his excessive love has had to overcome, though he still anxiously harps on the problems they pose for him within his social circle. His aunt, Lady Catherine, later characterises these differences in particularly harsh terms when she conveys what Elizabeth's marriage to Darcy will become: "Will the shades of Pemberley be thus polluted?" Although Elizabeth responds to Lady Catherine's accusations that hers is a potentially contaminating economic and social position (Elizabeth even insists she and Darcy, as a gentleman's daughter and a gentleman, are "equals"), Lady Catherine refuses to accept the possibility of Darcy's marriage to Elizabeth. However, as the novel closes, "...through curiosity to see how his wife conducted herself", Lady Catherine condescends to visit them at Pemberley.

As is apparent from Elizabeth's response, the key class distinction in the social world of Pride and Prejudice is between those who are 'gentlemen' and those who are not. The main signifier of gentlemanly status in this world is the possession in the family of inherited landed wealth. Pemberley, Rosings Park and Longbourn are all inherited estates of longstanding; so the families that possess them do have the settled status of gentlemen, whereas Lucas Lodge is not, and Sir William and his family do not. Gentlemanly status could, however, be maintained by families not in possession of an estate for those in specific occupations; chiefly the Church, the Law, and the Armed Forces. But within these professions, the distinction was still evident. Officers in regular regiments of foot were gentlemen; officers in the Marines were not. Incumbent beneficed clergy (prebendaries, rectors and vicars) were gentleman, perpetual and assistant curates were not. For younger sons of titled and gentry families like Colonel Fitzwilliam, the Law, Church and the Army represented alternative refuges of gentility for those without landed wealth of their own. In this, the English landed gentry were unusual in Europe; younger sons of equivalent minor nobility in France, Sweden or Italy who entered salaried professions commonly were considered to have lost noble status.

Associated with the distinction between who is a gentleman and who is not, is the key question of the book: which qualities are 'gentlemanlike' and which are not? Elizabeth refuses Mr Darcy's first proposal on the grounds that his behaviour towards her and her family has consistently been, as it is, not gentlemanlike. Mr Darcy is incredulous at the charge, but eventually comes to accept the truth of it: "Your reproof, so well applied, I shall never forget: ‘Had you behaved in a more gentlemanlike manner.’" As historic gentlemanly status depended on retaining inherited land under the family name, so the conventional gentlemanlike qualities were seen in maintaining the dignity of that family name, the discharge of family obligations as 'debts of honour', and in deference to the wishes of one's elders and betters; qualities given formal status through the legal instruments of entailed succession and strict settlement by which both Pemberley and Longbourn are bound. But in the course of the plot, both Elizabeth and Mr Darcy come to see true gentlemanly qualities as rather being grounded in concern for the feelings of others, and in avoiding hurtful or overbearing deeds and words. Kitson Clark argues that in this, Austen prefigures changing ideals of gentlemanly qualities that underpin Victorian social and educational ethics.

The Bingleys present a particular problem for navigating class. Though Caroline Bingley and Mrs Hurst behave and speak of others as if they have always belonged in the upper echelons of society, Austen makes it clear that the Bingley fortunes stem from trade. The fact that Bingley rents Netherfield Hall – it is, after all, "to let" – distinguishes him significantly from Darcy, whose estate belonged to his father's family and who, through his mother, is the grandson and nephew of an earl. Bingley, unlike Darcy, does not yet own an estate but has portable and growing wealth that makes him a good catch on the marriage market for poorer daughters of the gentry, like Jane Bennet, or of ambitious merchants. Class plays a central role in the evolution of the characters, and Jane Austen's radical approach to class is seen as the plot unfolds.

An undercurrent of the old Anglo-Norman upper class is hinted at in the story, as suggested by the names of Fitzwilliam Darcy and his aunt, Lady Catherine de Bourgh; Fitzwilliam, D'Arcy, de Bourgh (Burke), and even Bennet, are traditional Norman surnames.

Relating to the lower classes, such characters are mostly only present through rare mentions, like asking "the housekeeper"; and those references exist mostly in a separate realm from the classes of the main characters, as when a discussion among the Bennet sisters pauses because someone from the staff walked in to the room to deliver a message. Main characters are, however, evaluated based on how they treat those of lower classes; Mr Darcy as being fair and honorable, Lady Catherine as scolding, hectoring and overbearing.

=== Self-knowledge ===
Through their interactions and their critiques of each other, Darcy and Elizabeth come to recognise their faults and work to correct them. Elizabeth meditates on her own mistakes thoroughly in chapter 36:

"How despicably have I acted!" she cried; "I, who have prided myself on my discernment! I, who have valued myself on my abilities! who have often disdained the generous candour of my sister, and gratified my vanity in useless or blameable distrust. How humiliating is this discovery! yet, how just a humiliation! Had I been in love, I could not have been more wretchedly blind. But vanity, not love, has been my folly. Pleased with the preference of one, and offended by the neglect of the other, on the very beginning of our acquaintance, I have courted prepossession and ignorance, and driven reason away, where either were concerned. Till this moment I never knew myself."

Other characters rarely exhibit this depth of understanding, or at least are not given the space within the novel for this sort of development.

Tanner writes that Mrs Bennet in particular, "has a very limited view of the requirements of that performance; lacking any introspective tendencies she is incapable of appreciating the feelings of others and is only aware of material objects". Mrs Bennet's behaviour reflects the society in which she lives, as she knows that her daughters will not succeed if they do not get married. "The business of her life was to get her daughters married: its solace was visiting and news." This shows that Mrs Bennet is only aware of "material objects" and not of her feelings and emotions.

A notable exception is Charlotte Lucas, Elizabeth Bennet's close friend and confidant. She accepts Mr Collins's proposal of marriage once Lizzie rejects him, not out of sentiment but acute awareness of her circumstances as "one of a large family". Charlotte's decision is reflective of her prudent nature and awareness.

== Style ==
=== Free indirect speech ===
Pride and Prejudice, like most of Austen's works, employs the narrative technique of free indirect speech, which has been defined as "the free representation of a character's speech, by which one means, not words actually spoken by a character, but the words that typify the character's thoughts, or the way the character would think or speak, if she thought or spoke".

Austen creates her characters with fully developed personalities and unique voices. Though Darcy and Elizabeth are very alike, they are also considerably different. By using a narrative that adopts the tone and vocabulary of a particular character (in this case, Elizabeth), Austen invites the reader to follow events from Elizabeth's viewpoint, sharing her prejudices and misapprehensions. "The learning curve, while undergone by both protagonists, is disclosed to us solely through Elizabeth's point of view and her free indirect speech is essential ... for it is through it that we remain caught, if not stuck, within Elizabeth's misprisions."

Austen uses irony throughout the novel, especially from the viewpoint of the character of Elizabeth Bennet. She conveys the "oppressive rules of femininity that actually dominate her life and work, and are covered by her beautifully carved trojan horse of ironic distance". Beginning with a historical investigation of the development of a particular literary form and then transitioning into empirical verifications, it reveals free indirect discourse as a tool that emerged over time as practical means for addressing the physical distinctness of minds. Seen in this way, free indirect discourse is a distinctly literary response to an environmental concern, providing a scientific justification that does not reduce literature to a mechanical extension of biology, but takes its value to be its own original form.

=== Letters ===
Overall across the novel, around 40 letters are quoted or alluded to; such that many commentators have proposed - though without concrete textual evidence - that Austen's novels, 'Pride and Prejudice' and 'Sense and Sensibility', may both first have been drafted as epistolary novels consisting entirely of letters - as her novella Lady Susan had been.

While free indirect speech builds up with the reader an identification with the current feelings and understandings of Elizabeth Bennet, at other times the reader is allowed to gain further knowledge of other characters' sentiments through the exchange of letters. This is especially the case for Darcy's letter to Elizabeth following his disastrous first proposal; through his letter, the reader and Elizabeth are given insight into Darcy's feelings and motivations in his own voice, to a degree that he could not then have expressed to Elizabeth outright. Moreover, this letter provides Elizabeth with proofs of Wickham's true character, which leads her to question her condemnation of Darcy's treatment of him.

Letters in the novel are several times given a detailed description as physical objects; what envelopes they have, whether they have inserted sheets or are written entirely on the 'envelope' sheet, and the size and quality of the writing. In an age when physical contact, especially between unmarried persons of opposite sex, is highly constrained by convention and civility, a letter as an artefact handled over a prolonged period by the sender could stand as an active token of their physical presence. Elizabeth is said to have continually reread and reexamined Darcy's letter to her, to the extent that these rereadings constitute a substitute dialogue and interaction with Darcy through which her feelings for him can change (and unchange) over an extended period. "Knowing Darcy's letter "by heart" primes Elizabeth to seriously contemplate knowing his heart, an experience Austen imaginatively explores in the novel's ensuing chapters." Austen's use of letters in the novel allows them to be developed with a 'life cycle', both a past history and a future destiny. "The letter sets in motion the reassessment and interior work that prepares both parties to start afresh when they cross paths in Derbyshire."

The many letters quoted and alluded to in Pride and Prejudice can be divided into two broad categories: formal letters of civility; introduction, invitation, acceptance (and excuse), thanks for hospitality, condolence and congratulation; and otherwise private, personal and business letters. Formal letters are commonly expected to be read out loud in a household; personal letters are to be read by the recipient in private; and in general are expected to be treated in confidence, though it is always understood that a letter 'belongs' to its recipient. Crucially, in the novel, characters express feelings and communicate understandings in private and personal letters, that they may be inhibited by civility from stating face-to-face; as when Aunt Gardiner writes to Elizabeth, "Will you be angry with me, my dear Lizzy) if I take this opportunity of saying (what I was never bold enough to say before) how much I like him?". Consequently, the novel is able to juxtapose characters in situations when the reader is aware of a dislocation between the characters' feelings arising from what they know to be the case from a private letter, and the feelings they are constrained to express in civil conversational exchange. Characteristically, in reporting such exchanges, Austen refrains from giving explicit expression to her character's inner feelings, leaving it to the reader to understand their undercurrent of suppressed rage; as in the conversation between Elizabeth and Wickham following her receiving a letter from Aunt Gardiner relating Wickham's recent villainies in London.

=== Elizabeth's letters in the resolution of the plot ===
The bulk of the letters cited in the novel are addressed to, or read to, Elizabeth Bennet without citing her letters in response. But in the final chapters, we read an exchange of letters between Elizabeth and Aunt Gardiner, apparently providing the mechanism through which the plot is brought to a conclusion. This resolution relies on there being an implicit license to express in private letters, speculations that could not in civility be said in conversation.

By this time, it is clear to the reader that Elizabeth and Darcy have both come to regret their former mischaracterisations of one another, and are primed to recognise their love. But the circumstances of Darcy's first proposal, his crass denigration of Elizabeth's family and herself, and the absolute finality of her dismissal of him in response, still stood in the way of the desired happy ending. As do the obligations set up by Darcy's paying off Wickham, which he had tried to keep secret. The logjam turns out to be broken in the unlikely person of Lady Catherine de Bourgh, who had received a report that the two may be about to become engaged, and then confronted first Elizabeth and then Darcy with a demand that they each undertake never to marry one another. Both in turn had refused to give any such guarantee; and in respect of Darcy, "its effect had been exactly contrariwise" in giving him reason to hope that a renewed and contrite proposal might be acceptable. But as John Sutherland has noted, Austen has set the reader a puzzle: who had given Lady Catherine the (premature) report of the oncoming engagement, and how? An answer appears to have been suggested to Elizabeth the day after Lady Catherine's visit, when Mr Bennet receives a letter from Mr Collins, who says that he had informed Lady Catherine of the possible engagement between Elizabeth and Darcy, intelligence which Mr Bennet concludes Mr Collins must have learned from a letter to Charlotte, which Mr Bennet assumes must have come from one of her family, "the good-natured, gossiping Lucases". But Elizabeth will have known this not to be at all likely, as the information passed to Lady Catherine – and then thrown back at her – had included private circumstances of the marriage settlement of Wickham and Lydia, which the Lucases would not have known.

A more plausible narrative may be suggested by Mia Barzilay Freund, who notes that "the swift cascade of events that results in her betrothal to Mr Darcy" had been triggered for Elizabeth through Lydia's unintended disclosure – on which she had been sworn to secrecy – that Darcy had attended her and Wickham's wedding. Elizabeth and Jane had promised Lydia not to probe any further outright, but Elizabeth is so overcome with suppositions about what this news may portend that she sidesteps Jane's assurances in writing to Aunt Gardiner, requesting further information in a letter, expressing surprise that "a person unconnected with any of us" should have been at the ceremony. This was coy and a sly stratagem, as Elizabeth admits to herself upon posting the letter. Aunt Gardiner, who has seen Darcy and Elizabeth together in Derbyshire, is not fooled for a moment, but provides a very full response; "slyness seems the fashion", she says, noting a similar coyness had been apparent in Darcy's conversation at Gracechurch Street, whenever the subject of Elizabeth arose. So Aunt Gardiner takes this mutual coyness as an invitation to do some private probing of her own; if Elizabeth is being sly about Darcy, and Darcy is being sly about Elizabeth, may Aunt Gardiner presume in supposing that they may be in it together? Might there indeed already be an understanding that they could marry one another? Aunt Gardiner recognises that, if Elizabeth and Darcy are to marry, then any obligations of honour created through Darcy's paying off Wickham must be open between them; whatever she had promised to Darcy.

Elizabeth does not reply immediately to Aunt Gardiner's letter, and does not know how to; not until after she has been confronted by Wickham, who presents her with what she now knows to be gross misrepresentations of the circumstances of his marriage, then with the glad events of Jane's engagement to Bingley, then with the shocking realisation that Lady Catherine and Mr Collins have also concluded that a marriage with Darcy could be on the cards, and then with Darcy's second, and whole-hearted, proposal. So well over a week passes before Elizabeth does reply, as she says, "I would have thanked you before, my dear aunt, as I ought to have done, for your long, kind, satisfactory detail of particulars; but, to say the truth, I was too cross to write. You supposed more than really existed. But now suppose as much as you chuse." As Freund notes; "too cross to write" would seem harsh as a response to Aunt Gardiner's playful and private 'suppositions', especially if "Mrs Gardiner’s letter precipitates the change in circumstance that allows Elizabeth to furnish her with a favourable reply". But Elizabeth would have known that Aunt Gardiner would likely also have been writing to Charlotte to tell the Collins's why they could not have been invited to Wickham and Lydia's wedding; and if Elizabeth – whether correctly or not – suspected that Aunt Gardiner's suppositions could have been apparent, however obliquely, in a letter to the Collins's – and so to Lady Catherine – then her short-term harshness, and crossness, would be more explicable. Nevertheless, two play at the supposition game; so arguably it is Elizabeth Bennet, if indirectly and partially, who betrays Elizabeth Bennet.

== Development of the novel ==
Page 2 of a letter from Jane Austen to her sister Cassandra (11 June 1799) in which she first mentions Pride and Prejudice, using its working title First Impressions

Austen began writing the novel after staying at Goodnestone Park in Kent with her brother Edward and his wife in 1796. It was originally titled First Impressions, and was written between October 1796 and August 1797. On 1 November 1797 Austen's father sent a letter to London bookseller Thomas Cadell to ask if he had any interest in seeing the manuscript, but the offer was declined by return post.

The Militia were mobilised after the French declaration of war on Britain in February 1793, and there was initially a lack of barracks for all the militia regiments, requiring the militia to set up huge camps in the countryside, which the novel refers to several times. The Brighton camp for which the militia regiment leaves in May after spending the winter in Meryton was opened in August 1793, and the barracks for all the regiments of the militia were completed by 1796, placing the events of the novel between 1793 and 1795.

Austen made significant revisions to the manuscript for First Impressions between 1811 and 1812. As nothing remains of the original manuscript, study of the first drafts of the novel is reduced to conjecture. From the large number of letters in the final novel, it is assumed that First Impressions was an epistolary novel.

She later renamed the story Pride and Prejudice around 1811/1812, when she sold the rights to publish the manuscript to Thomas Egerton for £110 (equivalent to £6,800 in 2025). In renaming the novel, Austen probably had in mind the "sufferings and oppositions" summarised in the final chapter of Fanny Burney's Cecilia, called "Pride and Prejudice", where the phrase appears three times in block capitals.

It is possible that the novel's original title was altered to avoid confusion with other works. In the years between the completion of First Impressions and its revision into Pride and Prejudice, two other works had been published under that name: a novel by Margaret Holford and a comedy by Horace Smith.

== Publication history ==
Title page of a 1907 edition illustrated by C. E. Brock

Austen sold the copyright for the novel to Thomas Egerton from the Military Library, Whitehall in exchange for £110 (Austen had asked for £150). This proved a costly decision. Austen had published Sense and Sensibility on a commission basis, whereby she indemnified the publisher against any losses and received any profits, less costs and the publisher's commission. Unaware that Sense and Sensibility would sell out its edition, making her £140, she passed the copyright to Egerton for a one-off payment, meaning that all the risk (and all the profits) would be his. Jan Fergus has calculated that Egerton subsequently made around £450 from just the first two editions of the book.

Egerton published the first edition of Pride and Prejudice in three hardcover volumes on 28 January 1813. It was advertised in The Morning Chronicle, priced at 18s. Favourable reviews saw this edition sold out, with a second edition published in October that year. A third edition was published in 1817.

In the Heritage Press edition of Pride and Prejudice, 42 illustrations by Helen Sewell were included in the steel engraving style, which were popular for book illustrations during the early to mid 1800s.

Foreign language translations first appeared in 1813 in French; subsequent translations were published in German, Danish, and Swedish. Pride and Prejudice was first published in the United States in August 1832 as Elizabeth Bennet or, Pride and Prejudice. The novel was also included in Richard Bentley's Standard Novel series in 1833. R. W. Chapman's scholarly edition of Pride and Prejudice, first published in 1923, has become the standard edition on which many modern published versions of the novel are based.

The novel was originally published anonymously, as were all of Austen's novels. However, whereas her first published novel, Sense and Sensibility, was presented as being written "by a Lady," Pride and Prejudice was attributed to "the Author of 'Sense and Sensibility. '" This began to consolidate a conception of Austen as an author, albeit anonymously. Her subsequent novels were similarly attributed to the anonymous author of all her then-published works.

== Reception ==
=== 19th century ===
The novel was well received, with three favourable reviews in the first months following publication. Anne Isabella Milbanke, later to be the wife of Lord Byron, called it "the fashionable novel". Noted critic and reviewer George Henry Lewes declared that he "would rather have written Pride and Prejudice, or Tom Jones, than any of the Waverley Novels".

Throughout the 19th century, not all reviews of the work were positive. Charlotte Brontë, in a letter to Lewes, wrote that Pride and Prejudice was a disappointment, "a carefully fenced, highly cultivated garden, with neat borders and delicate flowers; but [...] no open country, no fresh air, no blue hill, no bonny beck". Along with her, Mark Twain was overwhelmingly negative of the work. He stated, "Everytime I read Pride and Prejudice I want to dig [Austen] up and beat her over the skull with her own shin-bone."

Austen for her part thought the "playfulness and epigrammaticism" of Pride and Prejudice was excessive, complaining in a letter to her sister Cassandra in 1813 that the novel lacked "shade" and should have had a chapter "of solemn specious nonsense, about something unconnected with the story; an essay on writing, a critique on Walter Scott or the history of Buonaparté".

Walter Scott wrote in his journal, "Read again and for the third time at least, Miss Austen's very finely written novel of Pride and Prejudice."

=== 20th century ===
You could not shock her more than she shocks me,
Beside her Joyce seems innocent as grass.
It makes me most uncomfortable to see
An English spinster of the middle class
Describe the amorous effects of 'brass',
Reveal so frankly and with such sobriety
The economic basis of society.

W. H. Auden (1937) on Austen

The American scholar Claudia L. Johnson defended the novel from the criticism that it has an unrealistic fairy-tale quality. One critic, Mary Poovey, wrote that the "romantic conclusion" of Pride and Prejudice is an attempt to hedge the conflict between the "individualistic perspective inherent in the bourgeois value system and the authoritarian hierarchy retained from traditional, paternalistic society". Johnson wrote that Austen's view of a power structure capable of reformation was not an "escape" from conflict. Johnson wrote that the "outrageous unconventionality" of Elizabeth Bennet was in Austen's own time very daring, especially given the strict censorship that was imposed in Britain by the Prime Minister, William Pitt, in the 1790s when Austen wrote Pride and Prejudice.

In the early twentieth century, the term "Collins," named for Austen's William Collins, came into use as slang for a thank-you note to a host.

=== 21st century ===
- In 2003 the BBC conducted a poll for the "UK's Best-Loved Book" in which Pride and Prejudice came second, behind The Lord of the Rings.
- In a 2008 survey of more than 15,000 Australian readers, Pride and Prejudice came first in a list of the 101 best books ever written.
- The 200th anniversary of Pride and Prejudice on 28 January 2013 was celebrated around the globe by media networks such as the Huffington Post, The New York Times, and The Daily Telegraph, among others.

== Adaptations ==
=== Film, television and theatre ===
Numerous screen adaptations have contributed in popularising Pride and Prejudice.

The first television adaptation of the novel, written by Michael Barry, was produced in 1938 by the BBC. It is a lost television broadcast. Some of the notable film versions include the 1940 Academy Award-winning film, starring Greer Garson and Laurence Olivier (based in part on Helen Jerome's 1935 stage adaptation) and that of 2005, starring Keira Knightley (an Oscar-nominated performance) and Matthew Macfadyen. Television versions include two by the BBC: a 1980 version starring Elizabeth Garvie and David Rintoul and a 1995 version, starring Jennifer Ehle and Colin Firth. A new television adaptation of the novel for Netflix by Dolly Alderton and Euros Lyn and starring Emma Corrin and Jack Lowden as Elizabeth and Darcy went into production in the summer of 2025. The series is to be released in the Autumn of 2026.

A stage version created by Helen Jerome premiered at the Music Box Theatre in New York in 1935, starring Adrianne Allen and Colin Keith-Johnston, and opened at the St James's Theatre in London in 1936, starring Celia Johnson and Hugh Williams. Elizabeth Refuses, a play by Margaret Macnamara of scenes from the novel was made into a TV programme by the Australian Broadcasting Corporation in 1957. First Impressions was a 1959 Broadway musical version starring Polly Bergen, Farley Granger, and Hermione Gingold. In 1995, a musical concept album was written by Bernard J. Taylor, with Claire Moore in the role of Elizabeth Bennet and Peter Karrie in the role of Mr Darcy. A new stage production, Jane Austen's Pride and Prejudice, The New Musical, was presented in concert on 21 October 2008 in Rochester, New York, with Colin Donnell as Darcy. The Swedish composer Daniel Nelson based his 2011 opera Stolthet och fördom on Pride and Prejudice. Works inspired by the book include Bride and Prejudice and Trishna (1985 Hindi TV series).

The Lizzie Bennet Diaries – which premiered on a dedicated YouTube channel on 9 April 2012, and concluded on 28 March 2013 – is an Emmy award-winning web-series which recounts the story via vlogs recorded primarily by the Bennet sisters. It was created by Hank Green and Bernie Su.

In 2017, the bicentenary year of Austen's death, Pride and Prejudice – An adaptation in Words and Music to music by Carl Davis from the 1995 film and text by Gill Hornby was performed in the UK, with Hayley Mills as the narrator This adaptation was presented in 2024 at the Sydney Opera House and the Arts Centre Melbourne, narrated by Nadine Garner.

In 2018, part of the storyline of the Brazilian soap opera Orgulho e Paixão, aired on TV Globo, was inspired by the book. The soap opera was also inspired by other works of Jane Austen. It features actors, Nathalia Dill, Thiago Lacerda, Agatha Moreira, Rodrigo Simas, Gabriela Duarte, Marcelo Faria, Alessandra Negrini, and Natália do Vale.

Fire Island is a movie written by Joel Kim Booster that reimagines Pride and Prejudice as a gay drama set on the quintessential gay vacation destination of Fire Island. Booster describes the movie "as an unapologetic and modern twist on Jane Austen's Pride and Prejudice". The movie was released in June 2022 and features a main cast of Asian-American actors.

=== Literature ===
Old Friends and New Fancies: An Imaginary Sequel to the Novels of Jane Austen, a novel by Sybil G. Brinton which was published in 1913, is often acknowledged to be the first sequel to the works of Jane Austen.

Pemberley Shades, by D. A. Bonavia-Hunt, was published in 1949. The novel was reviewed in the New York Times by writer Shirley Jackson, who said it was written with "modesty, affection and becoming sensibility."

Bridget Jones's Diary is a 1996 novel by Helen Fielding, which has many similarities to Pride and Prejudice. The book has spawned three sequels and four movies.

In March 2009, Seth Grahame-Smith's Pride and Prejudice and Zombies took Austen's work and mashed it up with zombie hordes, cannibalism, ninja and ultraviolent mayhem. In March 2010, Quirk Books published a prequel by Steve Hockensmith dealing with Elizabeth Bennet's early days as a zombie hunter, Pride and Prejudice and Zombies: Dawn of the Dreadfuls. The 2016 film of Grahame-Smith's adaptation was released starring Lily James, Sam Riley and Matt Smith.

Marvel published its take on this classic by releasing a short comic series of five issues that stays true to the original storyline. The first issue was published on 1 April 2009 and was written by Nancy Hajeski. It was published as a graphic novel in 2010 with artwork by Hugo Petrus.

In 2011, detective novel author P. D. James published Death Comes to Pemberley, a murder mystery set six years after Elizabeth and Darcy's marriage.

Jo Baker's bestselling 2013 novel Longbourn imagines the lives of the servants of Pride and Prejudice. The novel was also adapted for radio, appearing on BBC Radio 4's Book at Bedtime, abridged by Sara Davies and read by Sophie Thompson. It was first broadcast in May 2014 and again on Radio 4 Extra in September 2018.

In the novel Eligible (published in 2016), Curtis Sittenfeld sets the characters of Pride and Prejudice in modern-day Cincinnati, where the Bennet parents, erstwhile Cincinnati social climbers, have fallen on hard times. Elizabeth is a successful and independent New York journalist, while Fitzwilliam Darcy is a cynical neurosurgeon.

Pride and Prejudice has also inspired works of scientific writing. In 2010, scientists named a pheromone identified in male mouse urine darcin, after Mr Darcy, because it strongly attracted females. In 2016, a scientific paper published in the Journal of Inherited Metabolic Disease speculated that Mrs Bennet may have been a carrier of a rare genetic disease, explaining why the Bennets didn't have any sons, and why some of the Bennet sisters are so silly.

In summer 2014, Udon Entertainment's Manga Classics line published a manga adaptation of Pride and Prejudice.

In 2020, Janice Hadlow released a novel entitled The Other Bennet Sister, which follows the life of Mary Bennet, the middle Bennet sister. The novel was later adapted into a television show of the same name, which premiered in March 2026 on BBC One.
