= Seven Hills School =

Private school in Cincinnati, Ohio, US

Location
- Cincinnati, Ohio; United States; 39°10′0″N 84°24′8″W

Information
- Type: Private school
- Established: 1974
- Head of school: Matthew J. Bolton
- Grades: PreK–12
- Campuses: Hillsdale; Doherty
- Colors: Blue & Gold
- Athletics conference: Miami Valley Conference
- Team name: Stingers
- Accreditation: ISACS
- Affiliation: National Association of Independent Schools
- Website: www.7hills.org

The Seven Hills School is a PreK–12 private school in Cincinnati, Ohio, United States. It was established in 1974 with roots dating back to 1906 and operates on two campuses; Hillsdale (PreK–12) and Doherty (PreK–5). It is accredited by the Independent Schools Association of the Central States and is a member of the National Association of Independent Schools.

== History ==
The College Preparatory School for Girls was founded by Mary Harlan Doherty in 1906.

In 1916, Helen Lotspeich founded the Clifton Open-Air School. The school was moved from the Clifton neighborhood to its present location on Red Bank Road in 1930.

In 1927, another all-girls school called the Hillsdale School opened. A groundbreaking ceremony was held at the school's Deerfield Road location on June 6, 1927, ahead of the official opening on September 28, 1927. An announcement letter from the school's formulating committee stated, "A new Country Junior and Senior High School for girls has been organized in Cincinnati along modern educational lines."

The Hillsdale School later merged to form the Hillsdale-Lotspeich School. In the summer of 1955, Hillsdale-Lotspeich obtained 20 acres of land on Red Bank Road, neighboring the existing Hillsdale School. The Hillsdale-Lotspeich School became partially co-educational in 1971.

In 1974, the high schools of the College Preparatory School and the Hillsdale-Lotspeich School merged to form the Seven Hills School, operating out of the Hillsdale campus on Red Bank Road. The new school's opening was marked with a convocation on September 19, 1974. Following the merger, the College Preparatory School's location in Madisonville continued to operate as an elementary school, while the Hillsdale campus operated all grades from preschool to twelfth grade.

The school undertook two major construction projects in 2001. The 75-year-old upper school building on the Hillsdale campus was demolished to make way for a new building that would be more than twice as big. Upper school classes were held in temporary buildings for a year before the new building opened. Additionally, a 1920s building on the Doherty campus was demolished and replaced with Haile Hall, a new facility housing the preschool, kindergarten, and afterschool programs as well as Doherty's administration offices.

In 2024, the school announced plans to close the Doherty campus by the beginning of the 2027–28 school year. They will be selling it to Springer School and Center. Plans at the Hillsdale campus include demolition of the existing lower school building and replacement with a new, higher capacity building, expansion of the existing early childhood center, and renovation of Founders Hall, the school's cafeteria.

== Athletics ==
The Seven Hills Stingers are a member of the Miami Valley Conference, which is part of the Ohio High School Athletic Association. Seven Hills has a combined total of ninety-seven teams playing soccer, basketball, baseball, softball, track and field, volleyball, tennis, cross country running, golf, gymnastics, cheerleading, lacrosse, swimming, diving, bowling, and squash.

== Notable alumni ==
- Mohini Bhardwaj, Olympic gymnast
- Sara Eisen, financial news anchor
- Dana Fabe, Chief Justice of the Alaska Supreme Court
- E. R. Fightmaster, actor, producer, and writer
- Broti Gupta, writer and podcaster
- Paul Hackett, lawyer and politician
- Diana Mara Henry, photographer*
- Tiffany Hines, actress
- Andy Paris, actor and playwright
- Curtis Sittenfeld, writer
- P.G. Sittenfeld, City Council of Cincinnati member, convicted in 2022 for federal charges of bribery and attempted extortion

* Diana Mara Henry attended the College Preparatory School for Girls, which later merged with Hillsdale-Lotspeich to form the Seven Hills School.
