= Stolthet och fördom =

Opéra comique by Daniel Nelson

Stolthet och fördom (Pride and Prejudice) is a three-act opéra comique by Daniel Nelson, to a libretto by Swedish playwright Sofia Fredén (born 1968) based on the popular 1813 English novel by Jane Austen.

The piece was written in 2010 to 2011 for the opera festival at Vadstena. Before the premiere the composer expressed his view of the work as an operetta in the sense that "a direct and immediate communication with an audience" is planned. One reviewer of the premiere noted musical influences of Michel Legrand and Igor Stravinsky in the score.

The premiere took place on 21 July 2011, at Vadstena Castle, Sweden, with David Björkman conducting soloists and the Vadstena Academy Opera Orchestra. A small ensemble is used: one flute, oboe, clarinet, horn, trumpet, a harp, piano, and strings and one percussionist.

== Roles ==
Role	Voice type	Premiere cast, 21 July 2011 (Conductor: David Björkman)
Lizzy	soprano	Elisabeth Meyer
Mr. Darcy	baritone	John Kinell
Lydia	soprano	Sofie Asplund
Mr. Wickham	tenor	Martin Vanberg
Charlotte	mezzo-soprano	Sara P Eriksson
Mr. Collins	baritone	Thomas Sepp
Mrs. Bennet	alto	Hélène Kimblad
Mr. Bennet	bass-baritone	Mikael Axelsson
Jane	soprano	Magdalena Risberg
Mr. Bingley	tenor	Jesper Säll

The plot follows closely that in the novel, although some characters (Lady Catherine de Bourgh, Mary Bennet) do not appear.

Nine video extracts from the first production have been uploaded by the composer to YouTube.
