= 2016 United States Senate election in Ohio =

- November 8, 2016
- Turnout: 71.33% (registered voters) ▲22.11pp
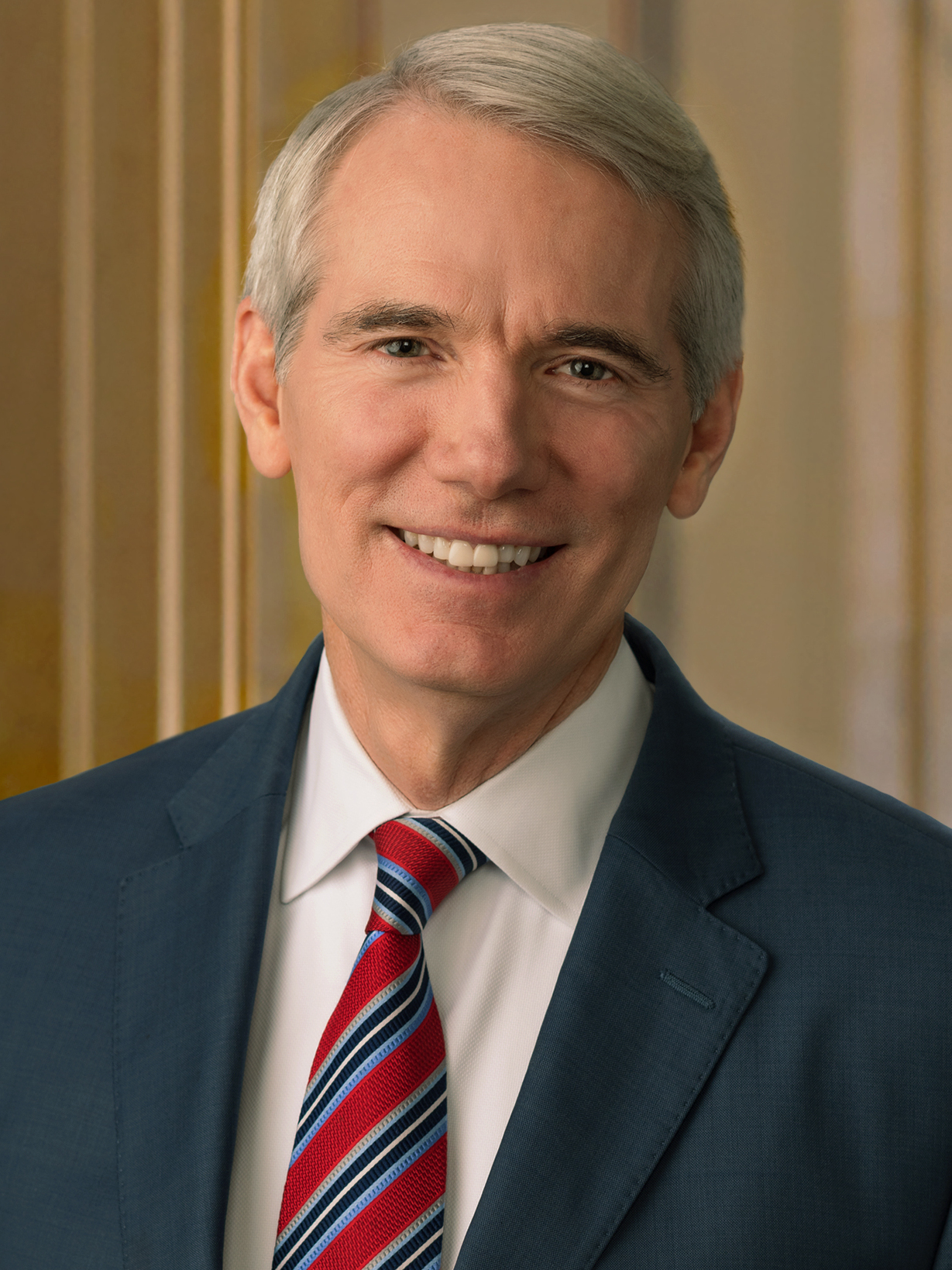

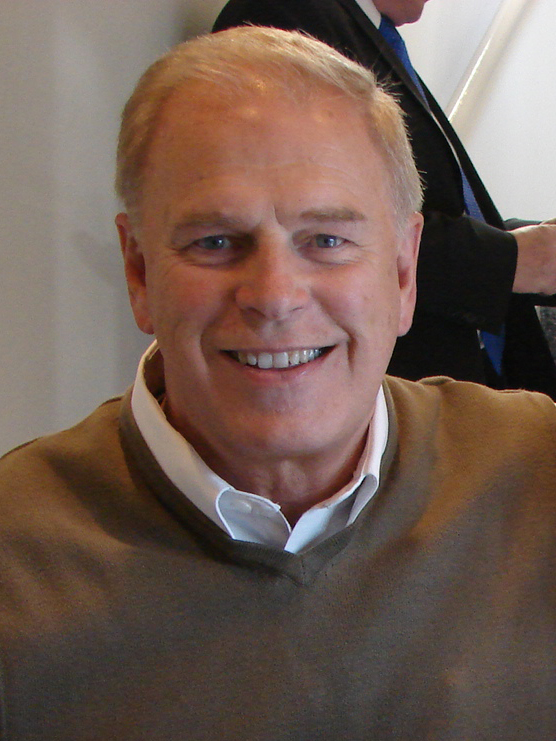
Nominee	Rob Portman	Ted Strickland
Party	Republican	Democratic
Popular vote	3,118,567	1,996,908
Percentage	58.03%	37.16%
- Portman: 40–50% 50–60% 60–70% 70–80% 80–90% >90% Strickland: 40–50% 50–60% 60–70% 70–80% 80–90% >90% Tie: 40–50%
U.S. senator before election
Rob Portman
Republican
Elected U.S. Senator
Rob Portman
Republican

The 2016 United States Senate election in Ohio was held on November 8, 2016, to elect a member of the United States Senate to represent the State of Ohio, concurrently with the 2016 U.S. presidential election, other elections to the United States Senate in other states, elections to the United States House of Representatives, and various state and local elections. The close of registration for electors in the primary election was December 16, 2015, and the primary election took place on March 15, 2016. Incumbent Republican U.S. Senator Rob Portman faced former Democratic Governor Ted Strickland. Green Party nominee Joseph DeMare was also on the ballot, along with two other independent candidates and one officially declared write-in candidate.

Initially, the seat was viewed by many to be a potential Democratic pickup, with some early polls showing Strickland ahead, but Portman attained a lead in the summer which grew through the duration of the campaign, and ultimately won re-election to a second term in a landslide, winning 58% of the vote. His vote total of 3,118,567 is the second largest in the state's history, falling 346,084 votes short of George Voinovich's record set in his 2004 re-election. Despite expanding his margin of victory, he lost Franklin County, a county he won in 2010 and home to the state's capital and largest city Columbus, signaling a long-term shift of this historically competitive county in Ohio elections.

== Republican primary ==
Republican Senator Rob Portman ran for re-election to a second term in office. He considered running for president in 2016, but ruled out running for two offices at the same time, even though Ohio law does allow it. He ultimately declined to run for president. The National Organization for Marriage and other socially conservative groups, unhappy with Portman's public backing for same-sex marriage, pledged to back a primary challenger. Tea Party groups, who heavily backed Portman in 2010, said that they were unlikely to do the same if he ran for re-election.

=== Candidates ===
==== Declared ====
- Don Elijah Eckhart, independent candidate for OH-15 in 2008
- Rob Portman, incumbent U.S. senator (2011–2023)

==== Disqualified ====
- Melissa Strzala, Tea Party activist (failed to gather enough valid signatures)

==== Declined ====
- Josh Mandel, Ohio state treasurer (2011–2019) and nominee for the U.S. Senate in 2012
- Steve Stivers, U.S. representative of Ohio's 15th congressional district (2011–2021)

=== Endorsements ===
Don Elijah Eckhart

Organizations

- Citizens for Community Values
- Greene County Republican Party

=== Polling ===
Poll source	Date(s) administered	Sample size	Margin of error	Don Elijah Eckhart	Rob Portman	Undecided
Public Policy Polling	March 4–6, 2016	638	± 3.9%	7%	60%	33%

Hypothetical polling

Poll source	Date(s) administered	Sample size	Margin of error	Ken Blackwell	Rob Portman	Undecided
Public Policy Polling	June 4–7, 2015	411	± 4.8%	24%	57%	20%

=== Results ===
Results by county Portman: 70–80%; 80–90%

Republican primary results
Party	Candidate	Votes	%
Republican	Rob Portman (incumbent)	1,336,686	82.16%
Republican	Don Elijah Eckhart	290,268	17.84%
Total votes		1,626,954	100.00%

== Democratic primary ==
=== Candidates ===
==== Declared ====
- Kelli Prather, occupational therapist and community organizer
- P.G. Sittenfeld, Cincinnati city councilman (2011–2022)
- Ted Strickland, former governor of Ohio (2007–2011) and former U.S. representative of Ohio's 6th congressional district (1993–1995, 1997–2007)

==== Withdrawn ====
- Bob Hagan, former member of the Ohio State Board of Education (2014–2015), former state senator from the 33rd district (1987–1997, 2007–2014) and former state representative from the 58th district (1997–2006)

==== Declined ====
- Joyce Beatty, U.S. representative of Ohio's 3rd congressional district (2013–present) and former state representative from the 27th district (1999–2008)
- John Boccieri, state representative from the 59th district (2015–2018), former U.S. representative of Ohio's 16th congressional district (2009–2011) and former state senator from the 33rd district (2007-2008)
- Jennifer Brunner, judge on the Ohio Tenth District Court of Appeals (2015–2021), former Ohio secretary of state (2007–2011) and candidate for the U.S. Senate in 2010
- Michael B. Coleman, mayor of Columbus (2000–2016)
- Richard Cordray, director of the Consumer Financial Protection Bureau (2012–2017), former attorney general of Ohio (2009–2011) and candidate for the U.S. Senate in 2000
- Connie Pillich, former state representative of the 28th district (2009–2014) and nominee for Ohio state treasurer in 2014
- Tim Ryan, U.S. representative of Ohio's 13th congressional district (2003-2023)
- Betty Sutton, administrator of the Saint Lawrence Seaway Development Corporation (2013–2017) and former U.S. representative of Ohio's 13th congressional district (2007–2013)
- Nina Turner, former state senator of the 25th district (2008–2014) and nominee for Ohio secretary of state in 2014
- Nan Whaley, mayor of Dayton (2014–2022)

=== Endorsements ===
P.G. Sittenfeld

U.S. cabinet members and cabinet-level officials

- Heather Zichal, former deputy assistant to the president for energy and climate change (2009–2013)

U.S. governors

- Dick Celeste, Ohio (1983–1991)

U.S. representatives (former)

- David S. Mann (1993–1995)
- Thomas C. Sawyer (1987–2003)

Ohio state representatives (current)

- Emilia Sykes (2015–2022)

Ohio state representatives (former)

- Tracy Maxwell Heard (2007–2014), former House majority leader

Mayors

- Dan Horrigan, mayor of Akron (2016–2024)
- Mark Mallory, former mayor of Cincinnati (2005–2013)

City Council members

- Chris Seelbach, Cincinnati city councilman (2011–2022)
- Yvette Simpson, Cincinnati city councilwoman (2011–2018)
- Wendell Young, Cincinnati city councilman (2010–2022)

County officials

- Russ Pry, former Summit County executive (2007–2016)
- Ilene Shapiro, Summit County Council president (2007–2016)

Individuals

- Jonathan Banks, actor
- Mark Hamill, actor
- Jim Ruvolo, former chair of the Ohio Democratic Party

Organizations

- Friends of the Earth

Newspapers

- Akron Beacon Journal
- The Plain Dealer

=== Polling ===
Poll source	Date(s) administered	Sample size	Margin of error	Kelli Prather	P.G. Sittenfeld	Ted Strickland	Undecided
Public Policy Polling	March 4–6, 2016	508	± 4.4%	6%	16%	50%	28%
Public Policy Polling	January 12–14, 2016	1,138	± ?	10%	10%	61%	18%
Public Policy Polling	June 4–7, 2015	360	± 5.2%	—	13%	65%	22%

=== Results ===
Results by county Strickland: 40–50%; 50–60%; 60–70%; 70–80%; 80–90%; 90–100%

Democratic primary results
Party	Candidate	Votes	%
Democratic	Ted Strickland	742,676	65.04%
Democratic	P.G. Sittenfeld	254,232	22.26%
Democratic	Kelli Prather	144,945	12.69%
Total votes		1,141,853	100.00%

== Green primary ==
=== Candidates ===
==== Declared ====
- Joe DeMare, factory worker and environmentalist

=== Results ===
Green primary results
Party	Candidate	Votes	%
Green	Joe DeMare	3,123	100.00%
Total votes		3,123	100.00%

== General election ==
=== Candidates ===
- Tom Connors (I)
- Joe DeMare (G), factory worker and environmentalist
- Rob Portman (R), incumbent senator
- Scott Rupert (I), truck driver and candidate for the U.S. Senate in 2012
- James Stahl (write-in)
- Ted Strickland (D), former governor of Ohio and former U.S. representative

=== Endorsements ===
Rob Portman

Presidents

- George W. Bush, 43rd president of the United States

U.S. cabinet members and cabinet-level officials

- Condoleezza Rice, 66th United States secretary of state

Governors

- John Kasich, Ohio and 2016 presidential candidate
- Mike Pence, Indiana and 2016 Republican vice presidential nominee

U.S. senators (current and former)

- John Cornyn, Texas and Senate majority whip
- Ted Cruz, Texas and 2016 presidential candidate
- George Voinovich, Ohio (former)

U.S. representatives (current and former)

- Steve Austria, Ohio (former)
- John Boehner, Ohio (former speaker of the House)
- Steve Chabot, Ohio
- Bob Gibbs, Ohio
- Bill Gradison, Ohio (former)
- Dave Hobson, Ohio (former)
- Bill Johnson, Ohio
- Jim Jordan, Ohio
- David Joyce, Ohio
- Bob Latta, Ohio
- Deborah Pryce, Ohio (former)
- Ralph Regula, Ohio (former)
- Jim Renacci, Ohio
- Paul Ryan, Wisconsin and speaker of the House of Representatives
- Jean Schmidt, Ohio (former)
- Steve Stivers, Ohio
- Pat Tiberi, Ohio
- Mike Turner, Ohio
- Brad Wenstrup, Ohio

Statewide officials

- Mike DeWine, Ohio attorney general (former senator from Ohio)
- Jon A. Husted, Ohio secretary of state
- Josh Mandel, Ohio state treasurer
- Mary Taylor, lieutenant governor of Ohio
- Dave Yost, Ohio state auditor

Diplomats

- John R. Bolton, former United States ambassador to the United Nations

Individuals

- Laura Bush, 43rd First Lady of the United States

Labor unions

- FOP - Fraternal Order of Police
- IBT - International Brotherhood of Teamsters
- IUOE - International Union of Operating Engineers
- UMW - United Mine Workers

Organizations

- National Federation of Independent Business
- National Rifle Association - Political Victory Fund
- Ohio Right to Life
- United States Chamber of Commerce

Newspapers

- Akron Beacon Journal
- The Blade
- Call & Post
- Chillicothe Gazette
- The Cincinnati Enquirer
- The Columbus Dispatch
- The Courier
- Crain's Cleveland Business
- Herald-Star
- The Highland County Press
- The Intelligencer and Wheeling News Register
- The Lima News
- Marietta Times
- Martins Ferry Times Leader
- Minority Communicator Newspaper
- The Parkersburg News and Sentinel
- The Plain Dealer
- The Repository
- Tiffin Advertiser-Tribune
- The Times-Gazette
- The Vindicator
Ted Strickland

Presidents

- Bill Clinton, 42nd president of the United States
- Barack Obama, 44th president of the United States

Vice presidents

- Joe Biden, 47th vice president of the United States

U.S.cCabinet members and cabinet-level officials

- Hillary Clinton, 67th United States secretary of state, 2008 presidential candidate and 2016 presidential nominee

U.S. senators

- Sherrod Brown, Ohio
- Al Franken, Minnesota
- Chris Murphy, Connecticut
- Bernie Sanders, Vermont and 2016 presidential candidate
- Elizabeth Warren, Massachusetts

U.S. representatives

- Joyce Beatty, Ohio
- Marcia Fudge, Ohio
- Gabby Giffords, Arizona (former)
- Tim Ryan, Ohio

Ohio state senators

- Edna Brown
- Joe Schiavoni (senate minority leader)

Ohio state representatives (current)

- Kathleen Clyde
- David J. Leland (former chair of the Ohio Democratic Party)
- Martin Sweeney

Ohio state representatives (former)

- John Patrick Carney (nominee for Ohio state auditor in 2014)
- Connie Pillich (nominee for Ohio state treasurer in 2014)

Mayors

- Michael B. Coleman, former mayor of Columbus
- Andrew Ginther, mayor of Columbus
- Paula Hicks-Hudson, mayor of Toledo
- Nan Whaley, mayor of Dayton

City council members

- P.G. Sittenfeld, Cincinnati city councilman

Individuals

- Mary Jo Hudson, Columbus School Board member and LGBT activist
- James Obergefell, plaintiff in the Obergefell v. Hodges United States Supreme Court case

Labor unions

- AFL–CIO
- OAPFF – Ohio Association of Professional Fire Fighters
- OEA – Ohio Education Association
- TWU – Transport Workers Union of America
- UAW – United Automobile Workers
- USW - United Steelworkers

Organizations

- Daily Kos
- Democratic Senatorial Campaign Committee
- League of Conservation Voters
- Ohio Democratic County Chairs Association
- Ohio Democratic Party
- People for the American Way
- Planned Parenthood

Newspapers

- The Athens News

=== Debates ===
Dates	Location	Portman	Strickland	Link
October 14, 2016	Youngstown, Ohio	Participant	Participant	
October 17, 2016	Columbus, Ohio	Participant	Participant	
October 20, 2016	Cleveland, Ohio	Participant	Participant	

=== Predictions ===
Source	Ranking	As of
The Cook Political Report	Lean R	November 2, 2016
Sabato's Crystal Ball	Safe R	November 7, 2016
Rothenberg Political Report	Likely R	November 3, 2016
Daily Kos	Safe R	November 8, 2016
Real Clear Politics	Safe R	November 7, 2016

=== Polling ===
Poll source	Date(s) administered	Sample size	Margin of error	Rob Portman (R)	Ted Strickland (D)	Other	Undecided
SurveyMonkey	November 1–7, 2016	2,860	± 4.6%	57%	39%	—	4%
SurveyMonkey	Oct 31–Nov 6, 2016	2,530	± 4.6%	57%	39%	—	4%
Emerson College	November 4–5, 2016	900	± 3.2%	49%	28%	11%	12%
The Columbus Dispatch	Oct 27–Nov 5, 2016	1,151	± 2.9%	58%	37%	—	5%
CBS News/YouGov	November 2–4, 2016	1,189	± 4.1%	52%	39%	3%	6%
SurveyMonkey	Oct 28–Nov 3, 2016	2,004	± 4.6%	58%	39%	—	3%
SurveyMonkey	Oct 27–Nov 2, 2016	1,728	± 4.6%	57%	40%	—	3%
Quinnipiac University	Oct 27–Nov 1, 2016	589	± 4.0%	56%	38%	—	6%
SurveyMonkey	Oct 26–Nov 1, 2016	1,586	± 4.6%	57%	39%	—	4%
SurveyMonkey	October 25–31, 2016	1,823	± 4.6%	55%	40%	—	5%
Emerson College	October 26–27, 2016	800	± 3.4%	49%	35%	4%	12%
Suffolk University	October 17–19, 2016	500	± 4.4%	46%	31%	6%	14%
Quinnipiac University	October 10–16, 2016	624	± 3.9%	54%	41%	1%	4%
Washington Post/SurveyMonkey	October 8–16, 2016	1,307	± 0.5%	56%	39%	—	5%
CNN/ORC	October 10–15, 2016	774 LV	± 3.5%	56%	40%	—	2%
CNN/ORC	October 10–15, 2016	890 RV	± 3.5%	55%	40%	—	2%
NBC/WSJ/Marist	October 10–12, 2016	724 LV	± 3.6%	55%	37%	3%	5%
NBC/WSJ/Marist	October 10–12, 2016	1,007 RV	± 3.1%	54%	36%	3%	6%
Emerson College	October 10–12, 2016	600	± 3.9%	47%	30%	6%	16%
Baldwin Wallace University	October 9–11, 2016	1,152	± 3.0%	48%	36%	—	16%
The Times-Picayune/Lucid	October 7–10, 2016	1,304	± 3.0%	51%	37%	—	12%
CBS News/YouGov	October 5–7, 2016	997	± 3.9%	49%	38%	2%	10%
Public Policy Polling	October 5–6, 2016	782	± 3.5%	51%	36%	—	12%
Monmouth University	October 1–4, 2016	405	± 4.9%	54%	39%	2%	5%
Quinnipiac University	Sept 27–Oct 2, 2016	497	± 4.4%	55%	38%	—	7%
Anzalone Liszt Grove Research	Sept 27–Oct 2, 2016	800	± 4.0%	51%	39%	5%	5%
Breitbart/Gravis Marketing	September 22–23, 2016	850	± 3.4%	44%	36%	—	20%
TargetSmart/William & Mary	September 15–22, 2016	652 LV	± 3.4%	47%	32%	4%	17%
TargetSmart/William & Mary	September 15–22, 2016	821 RV	± 3.4%	44%	34%	4%	18%
FOX News	September 18–20, 2016	737 LV	± 3.5%	51%	37%	1%	10%
FOX News	September 18–20, 2016	806 RV	± 3.5%	50%	37%	1%	10%
Greenberg Quinlan Rosner - Democracy Corps	September 10–19, 2016	400	± 4.0%	51%	34%	4%	11%
Suffolk University	September 12–14, 2016	500	± 4.4%	39%	31%	5%	23%
CNN/ORC	September 7–12, 2016	769 LV	± 3.0%	58%	37%	—	5%
CNN/ORC	September 7–12, 2016	895 RV	± 3.0%	56%	38%	—	5%
Bloomberg/Selzer	September 9–12, 2016	802	± 3.5%	53%	36%	3%	7%
Quinnipiac University	Aug 29–Sept 7, 2016	775	± 3.5%	51%	40%	1%	8%
Public Policy Polling	August 26–27, 2016	1,134	± 3.0%	48%	39%	—	13%
Emerson College	August 25–27, 2016	800	± 3.4%	40%	25%	10%	25%
Monmouth University	August 18–21, 2016	402	± 4.9%	48%	40%	4%	8%
CBS News/YouGov	August 17–19, 2016	997	± 3.9%	46%	39%	4%	11%
Quinnipiac University	July 30–August 7, 2016	812	± 3.4%	49%	40%	1%	10%
NBC/WSJ/Marist	August 3–7, 2016	889	± 3.3%	48%	43%	1%	8%
Public Policy Polling	July 22–24, 2016	1,334	± 2.7%	43%	38%	—	19%
Suffolk University	July 18–20, 2016	500	± 4.4%	37%	33%	6%	23%
CBS News/YouGov	July 13–15, 2016	1,104	± 3.5%	41%	40%	4%	14%
Quinnipiac University	June 30–July 11, 2016	955	± 3.2%	47%	40%	1%	9%
NBC/WSJ/Marist	July 5–10, 2016	848	± 3.4%	44%	44%	2%	10%
Public Policy Polling	June 22–23, 2016	708	± 3.7%	40%	39%	—	21%
Greenberg Quinlan Rosner - Democracy Corps	June 11–20, 2016	300	± 5.7%	40%	43%	—	17%
Quinnipiac University	June 8–19, 2016	971	± 3.1%	42%	42%	1%	11%
Public Policy Polling	June 8–9, 2016	781	± 3.4%	46%	42%	—	12%
Quinnipiac University	April 27–May 8, 2016	1,042	± 3.0%	42%	43%	1%	14%
Public Policy Polling	April 26–27, 2016	799	± 3.2%	38%	38%	1%	23%
Hart Research Associates	April 5–7, 2016	500	± 3.2%	47%	45%	—	8%
Public Policy Polling	March 4–6, 2016	1,248	± 2.8%	40%	41%	—	19%
Quinnipiac University	February 16–20, 2016	1,539	± 2.5%	42%	44%	—	14%
Baldwin Wallace University	February 11–20, 2016	825	± 3.4%	44%	40%	—	16%
Democracy Corps	October 24–28, 2015	400	± 4.9%	47%	47%	—	6%
Quinnipiac University	Sept 25–Oct 5, 2015	1,180	± 2.9%	43%	46%	1%	8%
Harstad Strategic Research	September 10–16, 2015	813	± 3.4%	43%	46%	—	11%
Quinnipiac University	August 7–18, 2015	1,096	± 3.0%	41%	44%	1%	10%
Quinnipiac University	June 4–15, 2015	1,191	± 2.8%	40%	46%	1%	13%
Public Policy Polling	June 4–7, 2015	859	± 3.3%	43%	41%	—	15%
Quinnipiac University	March 17–28, 2015	1,077	± 3.0%	39%	48%	—	13%
Public Policy Polling (D-Ohio Democratic Party)	March 2–3, 2015	946	± 3.2%	45%	45%	—	10%

Hypothetical polling

Poll source	Date(s) administered	Sample size	Margin of error	Rob Portman (R)	P.G. Sittenfeld (D)	Other	Undecided
Public Policy Polling	March 4–6, 2016	1,248	± 2.8%	42%	30%	—	27%
Quinnipiac University	February 16–20, 2016	1,539	± 2.5%	48%	29%	1%	22%
Baldwin Wallace University	February 11–20, 2016	825	± 3.4%	51%	26%	—	23%
Quinnipiac University	September 25 – October 5, 2015	1,180	± 2.9%	49%	27%	1%	18%
Quinnipiac University	August 7–18, 2015	1,096	± 3.0%	46%	25%	1%	22%
Quinnipiac University	June 4–15, 2015	1,191	± 2.8%	49%	24%	1%	25%
Public Policy Polling	June 4–7, 2015	859	± 3.3%	46%	28%	—	26%
Quinnipiac University	March 17–28, 2015	1,077	± 3.0%	47%	24%	1%	28%
Public Policy Polling↑	March 2–3, 2015	946	± 3.2%	50%	31%	—	15%

Poll source	Date(s) administered	Sample size	Margin of error	Ken Blackwell (R)	Ted Strickland (D)	Other	Undecided
Public Policy Polling	June 4–7, 2015	859	± 3.3%	36%	46%	—	18%

=== Results ===
United States Senate election in Ohio, 2016
Party	Candidate	Votes	%	±%
Republican	Rob Portman (incumbent)	3,118,567	58.03%	+1.18%
Democratic	Ted Strickland	1,996,908	37.16%	−2.24%
Independent	Tom Connors	93,041	1.73%	N/A
Green	Joseph R. DeMare	88,246	1.64%	N/A
Independent	Scott Rupert	77,291	1.44%	N/A
Independent	James Stahl (write-in)	111	0.00%	N/A
Total votes		5,374,164	100.0%	N/A
Republican hold				

==== Counties that flipped from Republican to Democratic ====
- Franklin (largest city: Columbus)

==== Counties that flipped from Democratic to Republican ====
- Mahoning (largest city: Youngstown)
- Trumbull (largest city: Warren)
- Monroe (largest city: Woodsfield)

==== By congressional district ====
Portman won 13 of 16 congressional districts, including one held by a Democrat.

District	Portman	Strickland	Representative
1st	60%	36%	Steve Chabot
2nd	65%	31%	Brad Wenstrup
3rd	36%	59%	Joyce Beatty
4th	69%	26%	Jim Jordan
5th	66%	30%	Bob Latta
6th	66%	29%	Bill Johnson
7th	65%	29%	Bob Gibbs
8th	72%	24%	Warren Davidson
9th	43%	51%	Marcy Kaptur
10th	60%	36%	Mike Turner
11th	23%	72%	Marcia Fudge
12th	62%	33%	Pat Tiberi
13th	48%	46%	Tim Ryan
14th	61%	34%	David Joyce
15th	62%	34%	Steve Stivers
16th	63%	32%	Jim Renacci

== Analysis ==
Despite this election being seen early on as a tight race, Portman began to gain the upper hand, as Strickland's campaign was said to be the worst he had ever run. Portman received the endorsements of many labor unions, including the Ohio Teamsters and the United Mine Workers Union, both of which usually endorsed Democrats. The shift of Strickland's Democratic base in Appalachian Ohio to the Republican Party and his lackluster fundraising allowed Portman to erode Strickland's early polling leads with heavy advertising.

By September 2016, Strickland's campaign was reported to be increasingly faltering, and with poor poll results against Portman, at least two major political action committees withdrew millions of dollars in funding for advertising, choosing instead to focus on other major Senate races in which advertising was considered more likely to make a difference. In the end, Portman won in a landslide. The only region where Strickland outperformed presidential candidate Hillary Clinton was Appalachia, but his performance there was still disappointing for an area he used to represent in Congress.
