= Curtis Sittenfeld =

American novelist (born 1975)

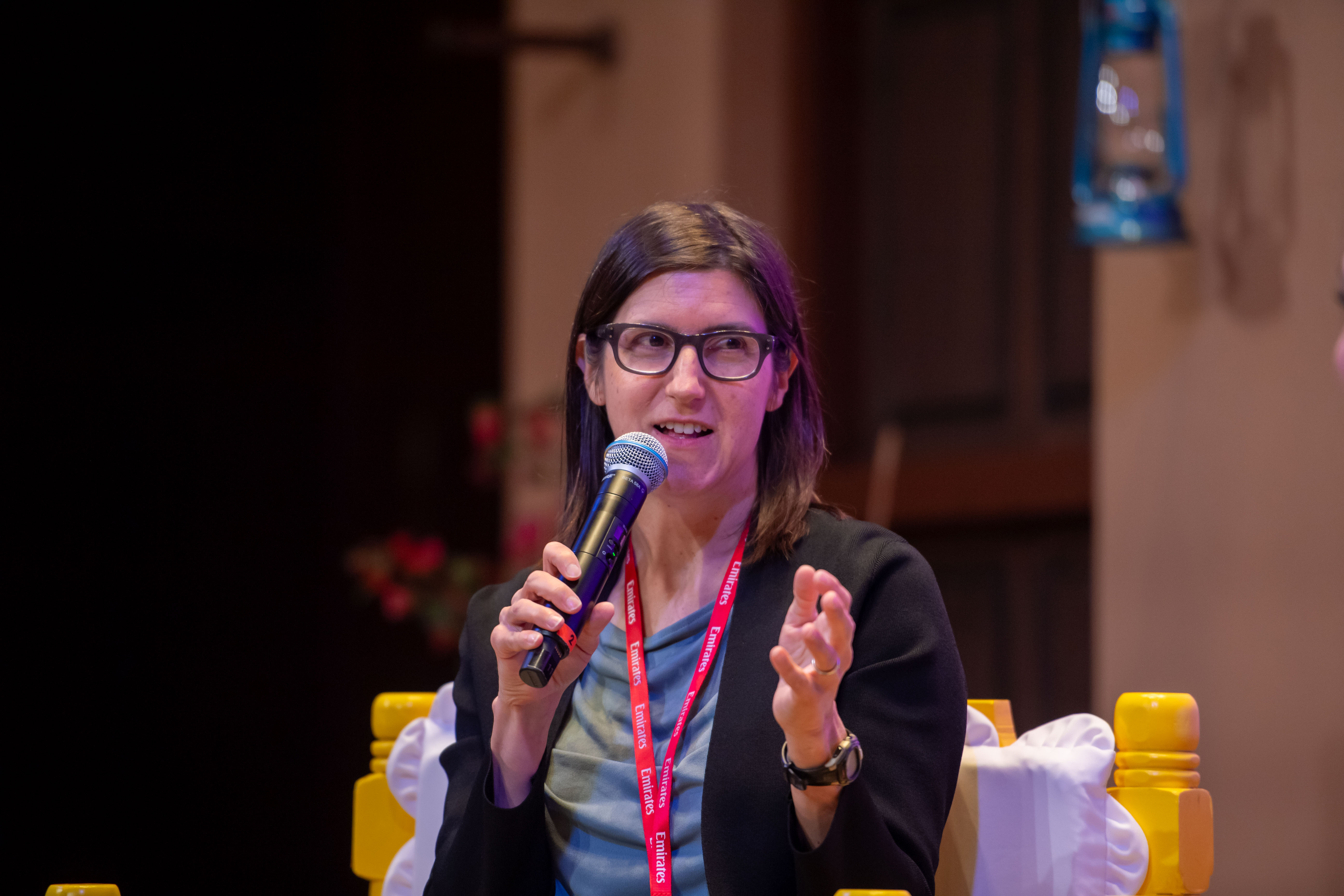
- Born: Elizabeth Curtis Sittenfeld; August 23, 1975 (age 51); Cincinnati, Ohio, U.S.
- Education: Stanford University (BA); University of Iowa (MFA)
- Occupation: Novelist
- Spouse: Matt Carlson (divorced 2026)
- Children: 2
- Relatives: P.G. Sittenfeld (brother), Tiernan Sittenfeld (sister)
- Writing career
- Language: English
- Genre: Fiction
- Website: curtissittenfeld.com

Elizabeth Curtis Sittenfeld (born August 23, 1975) is an American writer. She is the author of two collections of short stories, You Think it, I’ll Say It (2018) and Show Don't Tell (2025), as well as seven novels: Prep (2005), the story of students at a Massachusetts prep school; The Man of My Dreams (2006), a coming-of-age novel and an examination of romantic love; American Wife (2008), a fictional story loosely based on the life of First Lady Laura Bush; Sisterland (2013), which tells the story of identical twins with psychic powers; Eligible (2016), a modern-day retelling of Pride and Prejudice; Rodham (2020), an alternate history political novel about the life of Hillary Clinton; and Romantic Comedy (2023), a romance between a comedy writer and a pop star.

== Life and education ==
Elizabeth Curtis Sittenfeld was born August 23, 1975, in Cincinnati, Ohio. She is the second of four children (three girls and a boy) born to Elizabeth "Betsy" Curtis (née Bascom) and Paul George Sittenfeld (d. 2021). Her mother is an art history teacher and librarian at Seven Hills School, a private school in Cincinnati, and her father was an investment adviser. Her younger brother, P.G. Sittenfeld, is a former member of the Cincinnati City Council. Her mother is Catholic and her father was Jewish.

She attended Seven Hills School through the eighth grade, then attended high school at Groton School, a boarding school in Groton, Massachusetts, graduating in 1993. In 1992, the summer before her senior year, she won Seventeen magazine's fiction contest.

Sittenfeld attended Vassar College in Poughkeepsie, New York before transferring to Stanford University in Palo Alto, California. At Stanford, she studied creative writing, wrote articles for the college newspaper, and edited that paper's weekly arts magazine. At the time, she was also chosen as one of Glamourʼs College Women of the Year. She went on to earn an MFA from the Iowa Writers' Workshop at the University of Iowa.

In 2008, she married Matt Carlson, a professor of communications. They have two daughters. The family lived in St. Louis, before moving to Minneapolis in 2018. Sittenfeld and her husband split in 2025.

== Novels and short story collections ==
=== Prep ===
Sittenfeld's first novel, Prep, which took her three years to write, was published in 2005. It is narrated from the perspective of Lee Fiora, a teenager from South Bend, Indiana, who is accepted to attend Ault School, an elite boarding school near Boston, Massachusetts.

Elissa Schappell, who wrote in The New York Times Review of Books: "Sittenfeld's dialogue is so convincing that one wonders if she didn't wear a wire under her hockey kilt." The New York Times named Prep one of their top five works of fiction for 2005. Entertainment Weekly labelled Prep a "cult-classic" in a 2018 reassessment.

=== The Man of My Dreams ===
Sittenfeld's second novel, called The Man of My Dreams, was published in May 2006 by Random House. It follows a girl named Hannah from the end of her eighth grade year through her college years at Tufts University and into her late twenties.

=== American Wife ===
Sittenfeld's third novel, called American Wife (2008), is the tale of Alice Blackwell, a fictional character who shares many similarities with former First Lady Laura Bush. In November 2011, it was announced that Red Crown Productions had begun work on a film version, with the adaptation written by Academy Award-nominated screenwriter Ron Nyswaner.

=== Sisterland ===
Sisterland was published on June 25, 2013. The book's protagonist Kate is an identical twin with psychic powers.

=== Eligible ===
Eligible was published on April 19, 2016, by Random House. It is a contemporary retelling of Pride and Prejudice set in Cincinnati, Ohio. In September 2017, ABC announced its commitment to make a TV pilot of Eligible with Sherri Cooper and Jennifer Levin to write it.

=== You Think It, I'll Say It ===
You Think It, I'll Say It is a collection of short stories that Random House published on April 24, 2018.

=== Rodham ===
Rodham is an alternate history political novel about the life of Hillary Clinton, published in 2020. The novel diverges from reality at the point where Hillary chooses not to marry Bill Clinton and enters political life as a single woman. Rodham divided critics.

=== Romantic Comedy ===
A new novel, Romantic Comedy, was published in April 2023. The story follows Sally Milz, a late-night sketch comedy show writer, and Noah Brewster, a pop star.

=== Show Don’t Tell ===
A collection of 12 short stories published in 2025.

== Short stories ==
- "A for Alone" published in The New Yorker (2020)
