= Rodham (novel) =

2020 novel by Curtis Sittenfeld

- First edition cover
- Author: Curtis Sittenfeld
- Audio read by: Carrington MacDuffie
- Language: English
- Genre: Alternate history
- Publisher: Random House
- Publication date: May 19, 2020
- Publication place: United States
- Media type: Print (hardcover and paperback), e-book, audio
- Pages: 432
- ISBN: 978-0-399-59091-7 (hardcover)
- OCLC: 1137833872
- Dewey Decimal: 813/.6
- LC Class: PS3619.I94 R63 2020

Rodham is an American alternative history novel written by Curtis Sittenfeld and published in 2020.

The novel imagines a world in which 2016 U.S. Democratic presidential nominee Hillary Rodham Clinton never married Bill Clinton and instead pursued her own political career.

== Summary ==
In 1970, while a law student at Yale University, Hillary Rodham meets Bill Clinton and is surprised when the charismatic and handsome man pursues her intensely. Previously unlucky in love, Hillary is pleased that Bill seems to value both their intellectual and sexual connection. In the summer of 1971, Bill gives up his plans to work on George McGovern's campaign and follows Hillary to California where she will be interning. Their life seems blissful until Hillary catches Bill cheating on her with the daughter of her boss. Bill reveals to Hillary that while he loves her he also fears he is governed by sexual impulses that make him unable to stay faithful. Hillary reluctantly decides to forgive him.

In 1974, to the distress of her mentors and professional colleagues, Hillary moves to Fayetteville, Arkansas, helping Bill with his campaign for governor and preparing to build a life with him. Shortly before election day, Hillary is approached in a parking lot by a woman who claims that Bill raped her. Bill loses his campaign and falls into a depression. A few months later, Hillary decides to take an extended vacation to visit former friends and colleagues before preparing to marry Bill. However, upon her return, she finally confronts him about the rape allegation which Bill strenuously denies while admitting to further consensual affairs. Though Hillary still loves Bill and is willing to marry him, he asks her to leave him as he is unable to remain faithful.

In 1991, Hillary is now a successful law professor at Northwestern University. She is contacted by Bill who informs her that, after four terms as a governor, he intends to run for president. At the same time, Hillary is recruited to primary Alan J. Dixon in the Senate. She changes her mind when Carol Moseley Braun, a black woman, decides to primary Dixon, but after witnessing Braun's disorganized campaign, Hillary changes her mind once more and successfully runs for senate. At the same time, Clinton is outed for a long term affair he had with a cabaret singer. After a 60 Minutes interview with his wife goes horribly wrong, he drops out of the race and calls Hillary to congratulate her and to inform her that he is looking to leave politics for good.

By 2015, Hillary is preparing to run for president for the third time, part of a strategy she has been planning since 1997 to acclimate the country to the idea of a woman president. She is horrified when she learns that Bill has decided to enter the presidential race after having spent the previous decades earning millions in Silicon Valley.

As Bill quickly rises in the polls, Hillary and her team consider convincing Donald Trump to run as a Republican challenger hoping that he and Bill will cancel each other out as the media struggles to cover them both. Trump declines to join the race but positions himself in the media as a close Rodham advisor, eventually endorsing her with an offensive speech that denigrates immigrants.

Hillary is hit with an accusation of sexual assault from a former female staffer. To counteract the lesbian rumors that surround her, she arranges a fake date with a donor, Albert, and is pleasantly surprised when they genuinely connect.

A debate in which she apologizes to the former staffer inspires the woman who once accused Bill Clinton of rape to come forward. Hillary Rodham wins the Democratic primary and, eventually, the presidential race against Jeb Bush. On January 20, 2017, she is inaugurated as the first female president, with Terry McAuliffe as her vice president.

== Reception ==
The novel drew mixed reviews with reviewers finding "the entire premise was crass" yet also entertaining.

NPR called it "a nauseating, moving, morally suggestive, technically brilliant book". The New Yorker criticized the novel for creating a "less controversial Hillary" than her real life counterpart.

== TV series ==
An adaptation of the novel was announced to be in development at 20th Television. Sarah Treem was attached to write and executive produce, along with Warren Littlefield and the Sittenfeld executive producing as well. The series is being shopped around to various studios, including Hulu, who had passed on it. In 2022, it was announced that Claire Danes and Dakota Fanning have been cast as Clinton in different timeframes, and James Ponsoldt would direct.

== Alternate Presidents ==
The book sees two people who never became President hold the office: Jerry Brown (1997–2001) and John McCain (2001–2009). George H.W. Bush serves two terms, winning re-election in 1992. Barack Obama still serves two terms as President with Joe Biden as his Vice President (2009–2017). Obama beat Vice President Sam Brownback (and his running mate Jim Gilmore) in 2008.
