= Eligible (novel) =

2016 novel by Curtis Sittenfeld

- First edition
- Author: Curtis Sittenfeld
- Language: English
- Genre: Fiction
- Set in: Cincinnati, Ohio
- Publisher: Random House
- Publication date: April 19, 2016
- Publication place: United States
- Pages: 528
- ISBN: 978-0-8129-8034-9

Eligible: A Modern Retelling of Pride and Prejudice is a 2016 novel written by Curtis Sittenfeld that is a modern-day reinterpretation of Jane Austen's novel Pride and Prejudice set in Cincinnati, Ohio.

Eligible is the fourth book in the Austen Project, a series that pairs contemporary novelists with Jane Austen’s novels. Other writers include Joanna Trollope, Val McDermid, and Alexander McCall Smith: Sittenfeld was the first American writer to tackle Austen's work.

== Plot ==
Eligible tells the story of the five Bennet sisters - Jane (39), Liz (38), Mary (30), Kathleen "Kitty" (26), and Lydia (23). Jane is a yoga instructor and Liz is a writer for fashion magazine Mascara. They both live in New York City, but return to their sprawling childhood Tudor home in Cincinnati after their father has a health scare. The Tudor house they grew up in is falling apart just like their family. Mary is pursuing her third master's degree in psychology and still lives at home. Meanwhile, Kitty and Lydia are more focused on their CrossFit classes and playing with their cell phones than moving out and finding jobs. Jane and Liz take over as the family caretakers, doing everything from cleaning to running errands to cooking healthy, doctor-approved meals for their father and the rest of the family.

While all of this is going on, Mrs. Bennet, the family matriarch, really wants her daughters to get married. She is thrilled when she learns that a contestant on the dating reality TV show Eligible is coming to live and work as a doctor in Cincinnati. This doctor is named Chip Bingley, so in order to initiate a meeting with her daughters, Mrs. Bennet contacts a family friend and physician who also works at Christ Hospital with Chip. The group has a barbeque for the Fourth of July, and Chip and Jane immediately become smitten with one another. Meanwhile, Liz feels disparaged and disrespected by Chip's judgmental sister, Caroline, and by Chip's fellow physician and friend, Fitzwilliam Darcy.

The rest of the novel follows the general structure of Pride and Prejudice, as Liz navigates her love life and the ever-evolving changes in her family, from Lydia dating a new CrossFit trainer named Hamilton "Ham" Ryan to their Aunt Margot and her wealthy entrepreneur stepson, Cousin Willie, coming to visit the Tudor. She falls into a hate-sex relationship with Darcy, helps her parents sell their house, and supports Jane through a breakup (and later, reconciliation) with Chip. The novel ends happily with Chip and Jane getting married as part of an Eligible special wedding episode, where Liz and Darcy finally admit their love for each other.

== Characters ==
- Liz Bennet – the second-oldest Bennet daughter and protagonist. Liz returns home with her sister Jane after their father’s heart attack and takes on the brunt of the work in dealing with their family’s finances, which she discovers have become precarious.
- Jane Bennet - the oldest Bennet daughter. She has been trying to have a child on her own for several months before meeting Chip, and, after they break up and then get back together, marries him while six months pregnant in an Eligible special episode at the end of the novel.
- Chip Bingley - a doctor and former reality TV contestant who becomes infatuated with Jane the moment he meets her.
- Fitzwilliam Darcy - a brain surgeon at the local hospital and Chip’s best friend. His and Liz’s initially acrimonious relationship eventually becomes a friends-with-benefits one and they get engaged at the end of the novel.
- Fred and Sally Bennet - the Bennet parents, country-club Republicans who have let the family’s Tudor house fall into disrepair.
- Mary Bennet - the middle Bennet daughter, who spends most of her time in her room earning online master’s degrees. She is part of a weekly bowling league, which she conceals from her family.
- Kitty Bennet - the second-youngest Bennet, obsessed with CrossFit and a talented manicurist who eventually enrolls in cosmetology school.
- Lydia Bennet - the youngest Bennet, also a CrossFit devotee, elopes with Ham to her parents’ dismay.
- Jasper Wick - One-half of the split character George Wickham. Jasper is Liz’s longtime friend with whom she has had an on-again-off-again romance for most of her adulthood and who she eventually leaves after realizing his true nature.
- Hamilton "Ham" Ryan - The other half of the Wickham character from the original novel. Ham owns the gym where Kitty and Lydia do CrossFit and starts dating Lydia: when the Bennet parents find out he is transgender they struggle to accept the relationship until things are smoothed over with the help of Darcy.
- Cousin Willie (Collins) - The step-cousin of the Bennet daughters, a wealthy Silicon Valley figure who retains the awkwardness and arrogance of Mr. William Collins. He attempts to start dating Liz but is rebuffed and later starts dating her friend Charlotte Lucas.
- Caroline Bingley - Chip’s sister and manager, as well as Darcy’s ex-girlfriend, who dislikes Liz and attempts to quash their romance.
- Kathy de Bourgh - A famous feminist who formerly worked at the same fashion magazine as Liz. Unlike in the original novel, she has no connection to Mr. Collins or Darcy and her relationship with Liz is positive.

== Reception ==
The novel received mixed critical reception. Ursula K. Le Guin, writing for The Guardian, called it a "pointless trivialisation of Austen’s novel." Likewise, Michiko Kakutani for The New York Times described Eligible as "a heavy-handed and deeply unfunny parody," saying: "The layered satire and irony in “Pride and Prejudice” have been replaced here with high-decibel mockery, just as Austen’s sense of irony has been supplanted by sophomoric jokes."

Slate, however, refuted these criticisms, writing that "Just as her protagonists must succeed within and not outside of the marriage plot, Sittenfeld is likewise experimenting inside an inherited form...if to do so is presumption, it is presumption that Austen would wish for us all, including the outspoken lady writers Ursula K. Le Guin and Michiko Kakutani." Sarah Lyall, in a different New York Times review, was positive about the novel: "Taking the story out of England and bringing it to America has allowed Sittenfeld to draw back the curtains, throw open the windows, and let the air in, along the way lightly touching on such current topics as the cost of health care, artificial insemination, transgender and interracial relationships, and the unreality of reality television," she writes, comparing the novel favorably to the 1995 film Clueless.
