= Daniel Nelson (Swedish composer) =

Swedish composer (born 1965)

Daniel Nelson (born Bethesda, Maryland, 1 May 1965) is a composer living in Sweden.

He grew up in Sweden from 1970 to 1985. Then from 1985 at the Peabody Conservatory he took composition studies under Jean Eichelberger-Ivey, followed by MA studies at the University of Chicago with Ralph Shapey.

He works as a composer in Sweden. His oeuvre consists mainly of orchestral and instrumental works, but includes one opera Stolthet & fördom (2011). Of his concertante works, his Metallëphônic (2002) for tuba and orchestra has been performed over 40 times around the world.
