= Cincinnati mayoral elections =

Elections in US city

The mayor of Cincinnati, Ohio, is elected directly in a nonpartisan election separate from the City Council election. Until 2001, the candidate who received the most votes in the City Council election would become mayor. Mayoral candidates in the general election are chosen in an open primary.

Bold type indicates winner. Italic type indicates incumbent.

Date	Democratic	Republican	Charterite	Other
2021	**Aftab Pureval**			David Mann (D)
2017	**John Cranley**		Yvette Simpson	
2013	John Cranley: 33,428			Roxanne Qualls (D): 24,288
2009	**Mark Mallory**: 38,645	Brad Wenstrup: 32,424		Tom Chandler: 51
2005	Mark Mallory: 36,200			David Pepper (D): 33,664
2001	**Charlie Luken**: 47,755		Courtis Fuller: 38,494	

== Primary elections ==
As of 2001, the mayor of Cincinnati, Ohio, is elected directly in a separate election. Prior to that, it was the candidate who received the most votes in the city council election. Candidates in the general election are chosen in an open primary. in 2013, John Cranley (D), defeated Roxanne Qualls (D).

Italic type indicates incumbent.

Date	Winning candidates	Losing candidates
2001	Courtis Fuller (C): 17,091; Charles J. Luken (D): 12,077	Bill Brodberger (ind.): 1,763; Michael Riley (ind.): 651
