= 2021 Cincinnati mayoral election =

- November 2, 2021
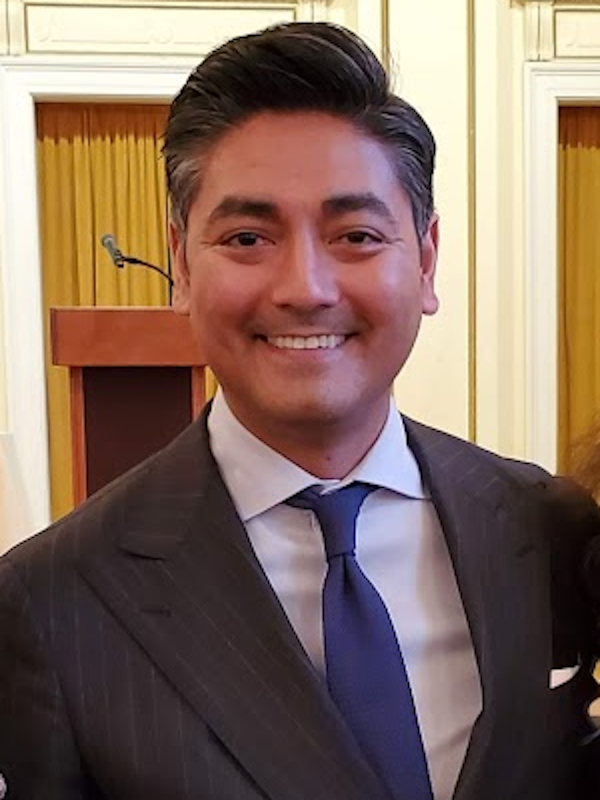

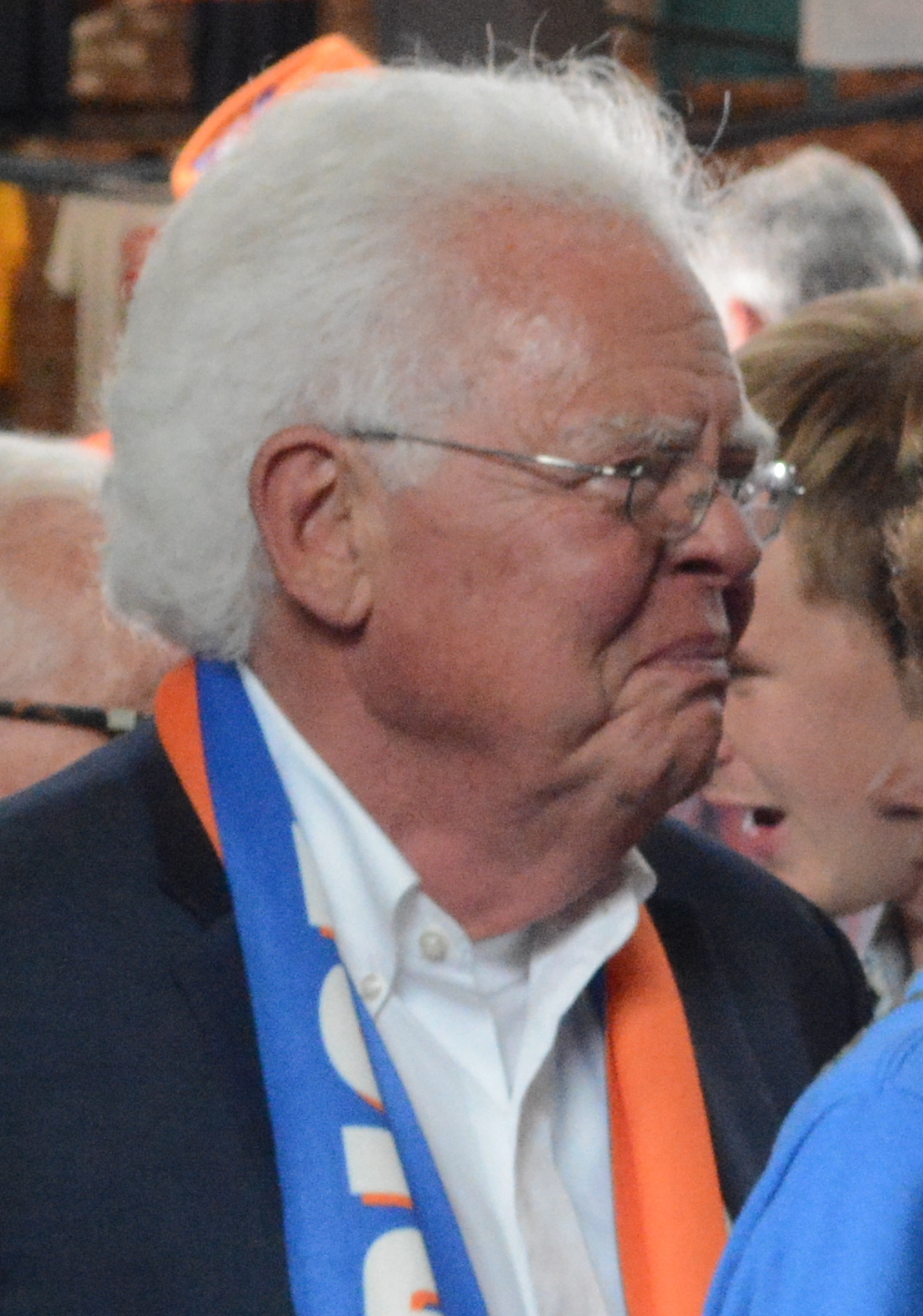
Candidate	Aftab Pureval	David Mann
Party	Nonpartisan	Nonpartisan
Popular vote	34,541	17,919
Percentage	65.84%	34.16%
- Precinct results: Pureval: 50-60% 60-70% 70-80% 80-90% >90% Mann: 50-60% >60%
Mayor before election
John Cranley
Democratic
Elected mayor
Aftab Pureval
Democratic

The 2021 Cincinnati mayoral election took place on November 2, 2021, to elect the mayor of Cincinnati, Ohio. The election was officially nonpartisan, with the top two candidates from the primary election on May 4, 2021 advancing to the general election, regardless of party. Incumbent Democratic mayor John Cranley, first elected in 2013, was term-limited and could not seek a third consecutive term. Democratic Hamilton County clerk of court Aftab Pureval won the election over fellow Democrat and former congressman David S. Mann.

== Primary election ==
=== Candidates ===
==== Declared ====
- Gavi Begtrup (D), small business owner, former policy advisor for U.S. Representative from Arizona Gabby Giffords
- David Mann (D), city councillor (1974–1992, 2013–present), former mayor of Cincinnati (1980–1982, 1991), former U.S. representative from Ohio's 1st congressional district (1993–1995)
- Herman Najoli (I), adjunct professor at Indiana Wesleyan University
- Raffel Prophett (D), retired firefighter
- Aftab Pureval (D), Hamilton County clerk of courts (2017–present), nominee for Ohio's 1st congressional district in 2018
- Cecil Thomas (D), state senator for the 9th district (2015–2023), former city councillor (2005–2013)

==== Disqualified ====
- Adam Koehler (I), tech entrepreneur
- Kelli Prather (D), community activist and perennial candidate
- Wendell Young (D), city councillor

==== Withdrawn ====
- P.G. Sittenfeld (D), city councillor and candidate for U.S. Senate in 2016

==== Declined ====
- Mark Mallory (D), director of community development at FC Cincinnati and former mayor of Cincinnati (endorsed Aftab Pureval)
- David Pepper (D), former chair of the Ohio Democratic Party, former Hamilton County commissioner, and nominee for attorney general of Ohio in 2014
- Chris Seelbach (D), city councillor
- Christopher Smitherman (I), vice mayor and city councillor (endorsed David Mann)

=== Polling ===
Poll source	Date(s) administered	Sample size (Note: Key: A – all adults RV – registered voters LV – likely voters V – unclear)	Margin of error	Gavi Begtrup	David Mann	Herman Najoli	Raffel Prophett	Aftab Pureval	Cecil Thomas	Undecided
Strategic Insights Research	April 9–12, 2021	237 (LV)	± 5.3%	7%	10%	15%	3%	24%	9%	32%

=== Endorsements ===
Gavi Begtrup (D)
- Gabby Giffords, founder of Giffords and former U.S. representative from Arizona's 8th congressional district (2007–2012)
David Mann (D)
- Kevin Flynn, former city councilor (Independent)
- Steve Goodin, city councilor (Republican)
- Liz Keating, city councilor (Republican)
- Charlie Luken, former mayor of Cincinnati
- Christopher Smitherman, vice mayor and city councillor (Independent)
- Jerry Springer, former mayor of Cincinnati and host of The Jerry Springer Show
- Betsy Sundermann, city councilor (Republican)
Aftab Pureval (D)
- Mark Mallory, director of community development at FC Cincinnati and former mayor of Cincinnati
- Charmaine McGuffey, Hamilton County sheriff
- David Pepper, former chair of Ohio Democratic Party and former member of Hamilton County Commission
- Jill Schiller, Hamilton County treasurer-elect

=== Results ===
2021 Cincinnati mayoral primary election results
Party	Candidate	Votes	%
Nonpartisan	Aftab Pureval	13,302	39.2
Nonpartisan	David Mann	9,830	29.0
Nonpartisan	Cecil Thomas	5,589	16.5
Nonpartisan	Gavi Begtrup	3,229	9.5
Nonpartisan	Raffel Prophett	1,196	3.5
Nonpartisan	Herman Najoli	780	2.3
Total ballots		33,926	100

== General election ==
=== Candidates ===
- David Mann, city councillor (Democratic Party)
- Aftab Pureval, Hamilton County Clerk of Courts (Democratic Party)

=== Post-primary endorsements ===
Aftab Pureval (D)

Individuals

- Sherrod Brown, U.S. senator (D-OH)
- Mike Moroski, Cincinnati school board member
- Raffel Prophett, retired firefighter, 2021 candidate for mayor of Cincinnati
- Cecil Thomas, state senator for the 9th district (2015–present), former city councillor (2005–2013), 2021 candidate for mayor of Cincinnati

Labor unions

- Amalgamated Transit Union Local 627
- Cincinnati AFL-CIO Labor Council
- Cincinnati Building Trades Union
- Cincinnati Federation of Teachers
- International Brotherhood of Electrical Workers Local 212
- Laborers Local 265
- United Food and Commercial Workers Local 75

Organizations

- Our Revolution

=== Fundraising ===
Campaign finance reports as of June 15, 2021
Candidate	Total raised	Cash on hand
David Mann	$172,330	$22,483
Aftab Pureval	$593,275	$73,277

=== Debates ===
2021 Cincinnati mayoral election debates
No.	Date & time	Host(s)	Moderator(s)	Link	Participants	
Key: P Participant N Non-invitee I Invitee					Mann	Pureval
1	September 21, 2021; 7:00 p.m. EDT	Cincinnati.com; Xavier University; WVXU	Kevin Aldridge		I	I

=== Results ===
2021 Cincinnati mayoral general election results
Party	Candidate	Votes	%
Nonpartisan	Aftab Pureval	34,541	65.8
Nonpartisan	David Mann	17,919	34.2
Total ballots		52,460	100
Democratic hold			
