= 2000 United States House of Representatives elections in Ohio =

- November 7, 2000

All 19 Ohio seats to the United States House of Representatives
	Majority party	Minority party
Party	Republican	Democratic
Last election	11	8
Seats won	11	8
Seat change	Steady	Steady
Popular vote	2,203,790	2,070,028
Percentage	48.74%	45.79%

Republican
50–60%
60–70%
70–80%
80–90%
Democratic
40–50%
50–60%
60–70%
70–80%
80–90%

The 2000 United States House of Representatives elections in Ohio were held on Tuesday, November 7, 2000 to elect the 19 U.S. representatives from the state of Ohio, one from each of the state's 19 congressional districts. The elections coincided with the elections of other federal and state offices, including a presidential election and an election to the U.S. Senate.

== Overview ==
United States House of Representatives elections in Ohio, 2000
Party	Votes	Percentage	Seats Before	Seats After	+/–
Republican	2,203,790	48.74%	11	11	-
Democratic	2,070,028	45.79%	8	8	-
Libertarian	103,546	2.29%	0	0	-
Independent	76,910	1.70%	0	0	-
Natural Law	66,943	1.48%	0	0	-
Totals	4,521,217	100%	19	19	-

== District 1 ==
2000 Ohio's 1st congressional district election
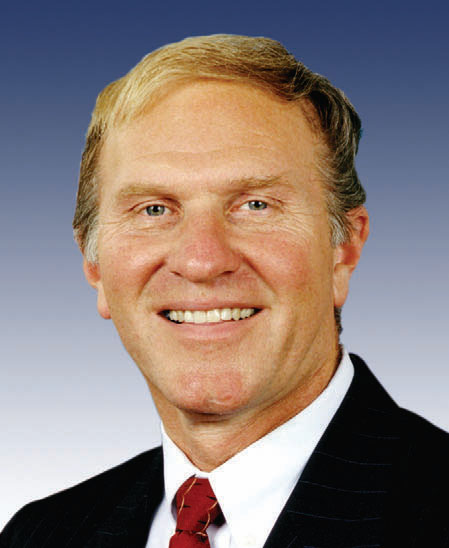

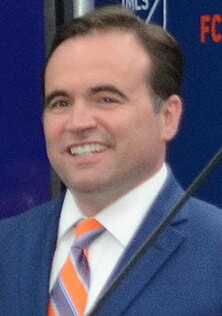
Nominee	Steve Chabot	John Cranley
Party	Republican	Democratic
Popular vote	116,768	98,328
Percentage	53.0%	44.6%
- County results Chabot: 50–60%
U.S. Representative before election
Steve Chabot
Republican
Elected U.S. Representative
Steve Chabot
Republican

=== General election ===
==== Polling ====
Poll source	Date(s)	Sample size	Margin of error	Steve Chabot (R)	John Cranley (D)	Other / undecided (Note: Calculated by taking the difference of 100% and all other candidates combined.)
SurveyUSA	October 30, 2000	500	—	58%	40%	2%

==== Results ====
Ohio's 1st Congressional District election, 2000
Party	Candidate	Votes	%
Republican	Steve Chabot (Incumbent)	116,768	53.0
Democratic	John Cranley	98,328	44.6
Libertarian	David Groshoff	3,399	1.5
Natural Law	Richard Stevenson	1,933	0.9
Total votes		220,428	100
Republican hold			

== District 2 ==
2000 Ohio's 2nd congressional district election

Nominee	Rob Portman	Charles W. Sanders
Party	Republican	Democratic
Popular vote	204,184	64,091
Percentage	73.6%	23.1%
- County results Portman: 70–80%
U.S. Representative before election
Rob Portman
Republican
Elected U.S. Representative
Rob Portman
Republican

=== General election results ===
Ohio's 2nd Congressional District election, 2000
Party	Candidate	Votes	%
Republican	Rob Portman (Incumbent)	204,184	73.6
Democratic	Charles W. Sanders	64,091	23.1
Libertarian	Robert Bidwell	9,266	3.3
Total votes		277,541	100
Republican hold			

== District 3 ==
2000 Ohio's 3rd congressional district election
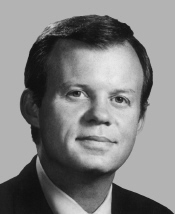

Nominee	Tony P. Hall	Regina Burch
Party	Democratic	Natural Law
Popular vote	177,731	36,516
Percentage	83.0%	17.0%
- County results Hall: 80–90%
U.S. Representative before election
Tony P. Hall
Democratic
Elected U.S. Representative
Tony P. Hall
Democratic

=== General election results ===
Ohio's 3rd Congressional District election, 2000
Party	Candidate	Votes	%
Democratic	Tony P. Hall (Incumbent)	177,731	83.0
Natural Law	Regina Burch	36,516	17.0
Total votes		214,247	100
Democratic hold			

== District 4 ==
2000 Ohio's 4th congressional district election
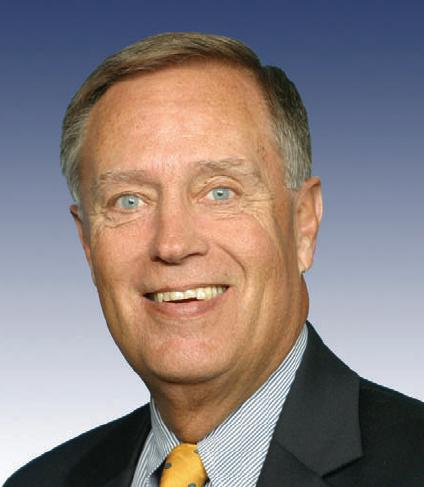

Nominee	Mike Oxley	Daniel Dickman
Party	Republican	Democratic
Popular vote	156,510	67,330
Percentage	67.4%	29.0%
- County results Oxley: 50–60% 60–70% 70–80%
U.S. Representative before election
Mike Oxley
Republican
Elected U.S. Representative
Mike Oxley
Republican

=== General election results ===
Ohio's 4th Congressional District election, 2000
Party	Candidate	Votes	%
Republican	Mike Oxley (Incumbent)	156,510	67.4
Democratic	Daniel Dickman	67,330	29.0
Libertarian	Ralph Mullinger	8,278	3.6
Total votes		232,118	100
Republican hold			

== District 5 ==
2000 Ohio's 5th congressional district election
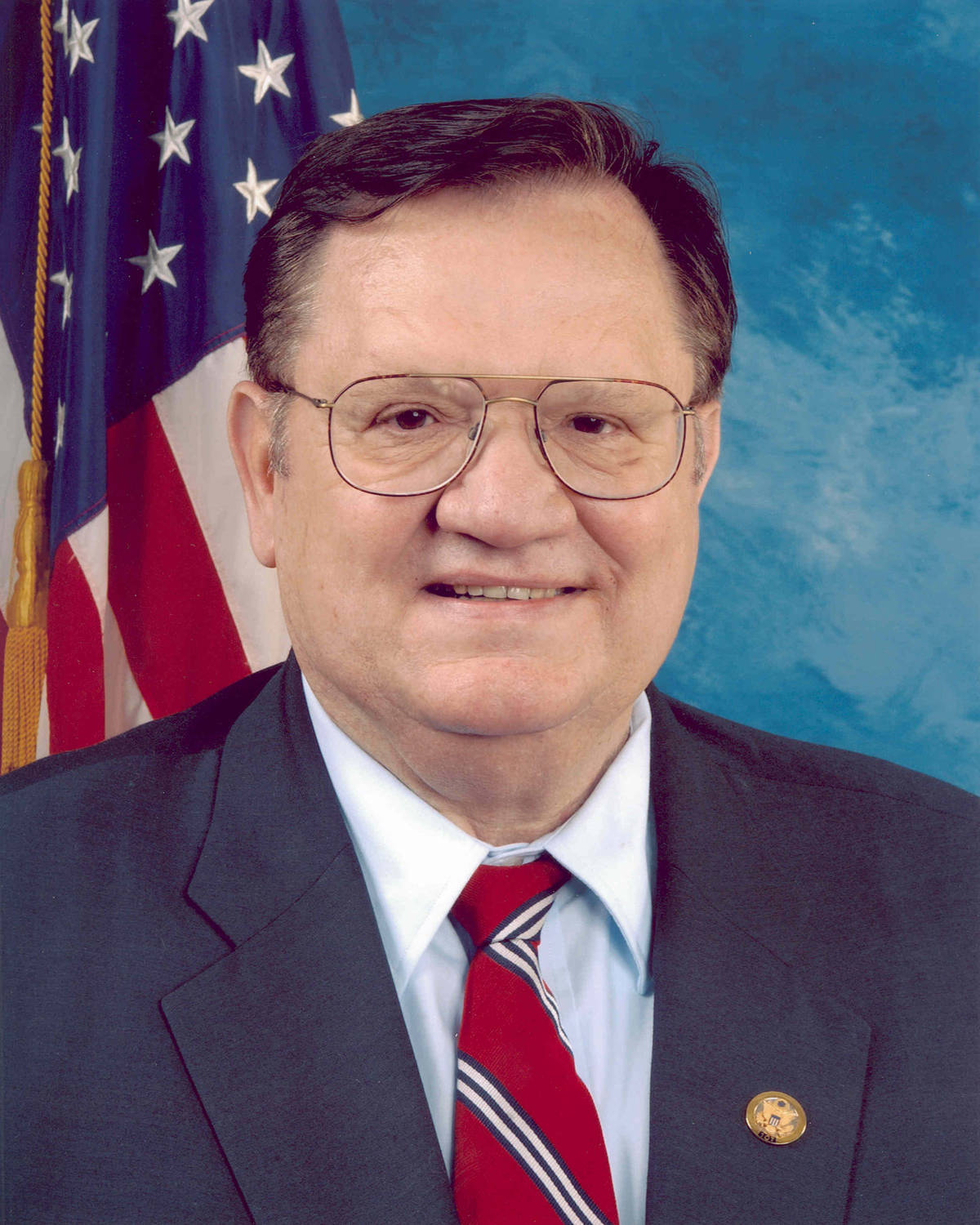

Nominee	Paul Gillmor	Dannie Edmon
Party	Republican	Democratic
Popular vote	169,857	62,138
Percentage	69.8%	25.5%
- County results Gillmor: 60–70% 70–80% 80–90%
U.S. Representative before election
Paul Gillmor
Republican
Elected U.S. Representative
Paul Gillmor
Republican

=== General election results ===
Ohio's 5th Congressional District election, 2000
Party	Candidate	Votes	%
Republican	Paul Gillmor (Incumbent)	169,857	69.8
Democratic	Dannie Edmon	62,138	25.5
Natural Law	David Schaffer	5,881	2.4
Libertarian	John Green	5,464	2.2
Total votes		243,340	100
Republican hold			

== District 6 ==
2000 Ohio's 6th congressional district election
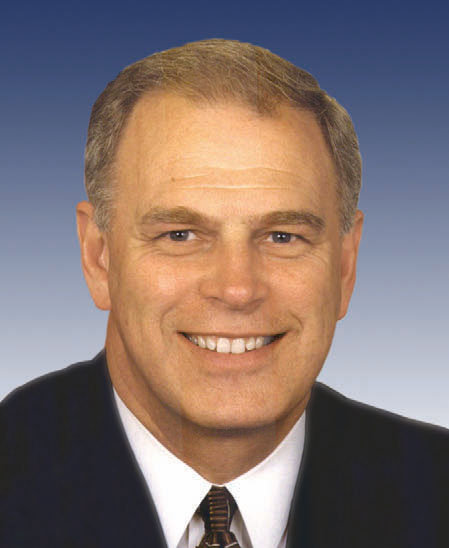

Nominee	Ted Strickland	Mike Azinger
Party	Democratic	Republican
Popular vote	138,849	96,966
Percentage	57.7%	40.3%
- County results Strickland: 50–60% 60–70% 70–80% Azinger: 50–60% 60–70%
U.S. Representative before election
Ted Strickland
Democratic
Elected U.S. Representative
Ted Strickland
Democratic

=== General election results ===
Ohio's 6th Congressional District election, 2000
Party	Candidate	Votes	%
Democratic	Ted Strickland (Incumbent)	138,849	57.7
Republican	Mike Azinger	96,966	40.3
Libertarian	Kenneth MacCutcheon	4,759	2.0
Total votes		240,574	100
Democratic hold			

== District 7 ==
2000 Ohio's 7th congressional district election
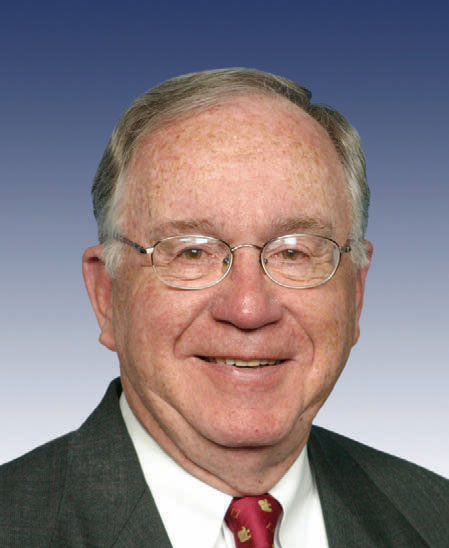

Nominee	Dave Hobson	Donald Minor	John Mitchel
Party	Republican	Democratic	Independent
Popular vote	163,646	60,755	13,983
Percentage	67.6%	25.1%	5.8%
- County results Hobson: 60–70% 70–80%
U.S. Representative before election
Dave Hobson
Republican
Elected U.S. Representative
Dave Hobson
Republican

=== General election results ===
Ohio's 7th Congressional District election, 2000
Party	Candidate	Votes	%
Republican	Dave Hobson (Incumbent)	163,646	67.6
Democratic	Donald Minor	60,755	25.1
Independent	John Mitchel	13,983	5.8
Libertarian	Jack Null	3,802	1.6
Total votes		242,186	100
Republican hold			

== District 8 ==
2000 Ohio's 8th congressional district election
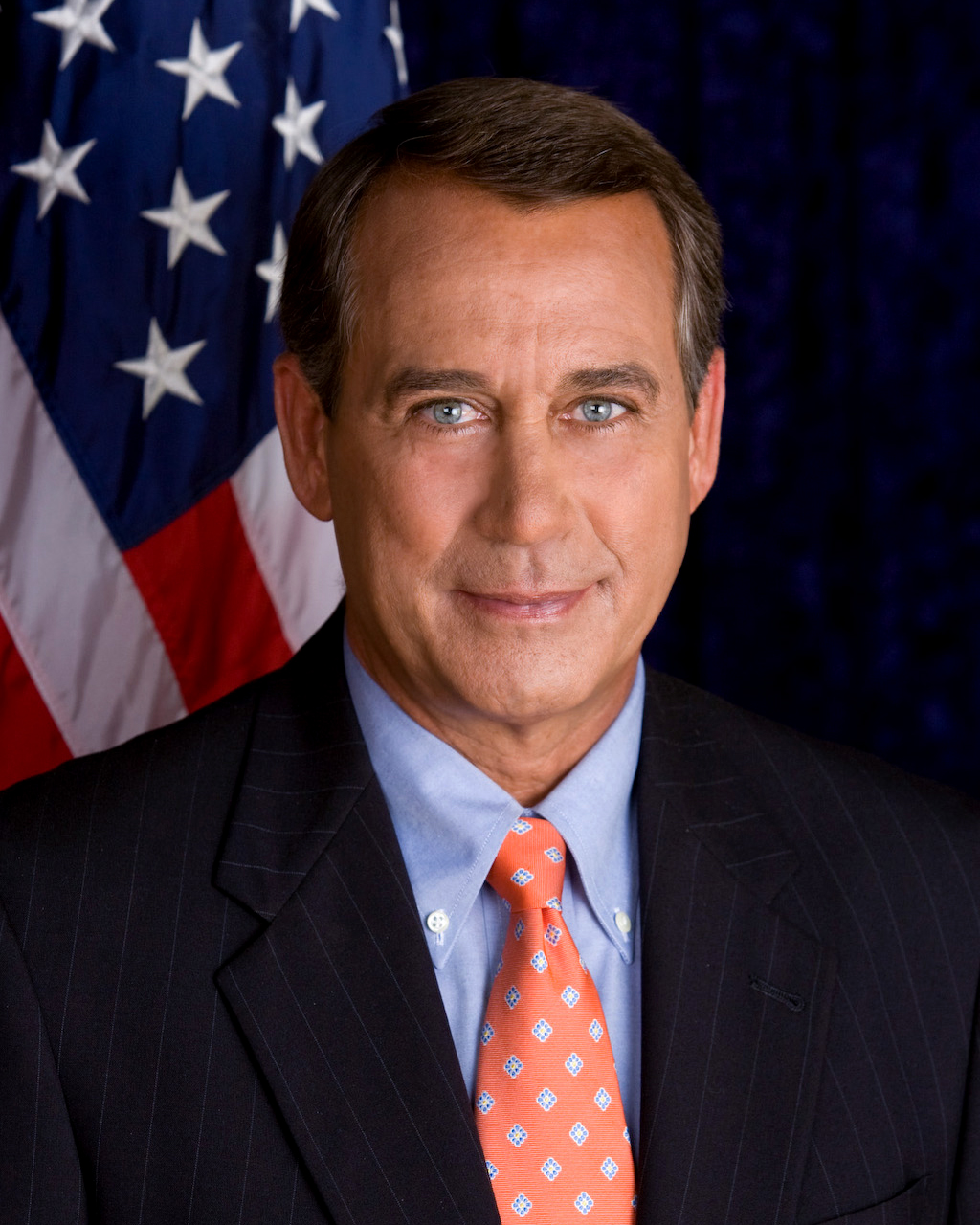

Nominee	John Boehner	John Parks
Party	Republican	Democratic
Popular vote	179,756	66,293
Percentage	71.0%	26.2%
- County results Boehner: 60–70% 70–80%
U.S. Representative before election
John Boehner
Republican
Elected U.S. Representative
John Boehner
Republican

=== General election results ===
Ohio's 8th Congressional District election, 2000
Party	Candidate	Votes	%
Republican	John Boehner (Incumbent)	179,756	71.0
Democratic	John Parks	66,293	26.2
Libertarian	David Shock	7,254	2.9
Total votes		253,303	100
Republican hold			

== District 9 ==
2000 Ohio's 9th congressional district election

Nominee	Marcy Kaptur	Dwight Bryan
Party	Democratic	Republican
Popular vote	168,547	49,446
Percentage	74.8%	21.9%
- County results Kaptur: 60–70% 70–80%
U.S. Representative before election
Marcy Kaptur
Democratic
Elected U.S. Representative
Marcy Kaptur
Democratic

=== General election results ===
Ohio's 9th Congressional District election, 2000
Party	Candidate	Votes	%
Democratic	Marcy Kaptur (Incumbent)	168,547	74.8
Republican	Dwight Bryan	49,446	21.9
Libertarian	Galen Fries	4,239	1.9
Natural Law	Dennis Slotnick	3,096	1.4
Total votes		225,328	100
Democratic hold			

== District 10 ==
2000 Ohio's 10th congressional district election
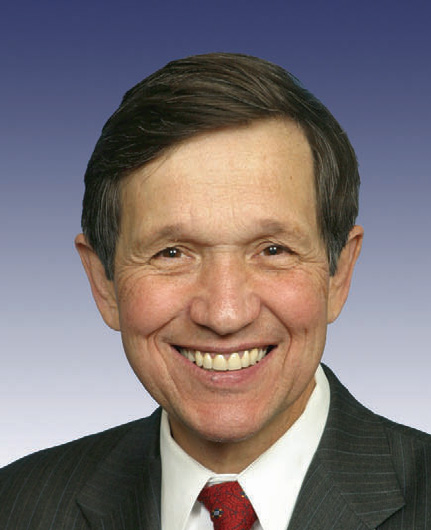

Nominee	Dennis Kucinich	Bill Smith
Party	Democratic	Republican
Popular vote	167,093	48,940
Percentage	75.0%	22.0%
- County results Kucinich: 70–80%
U.S. Representative before election
Dennis Kucinich
Democratic
Elected U.S. Representative
Dennis Kucinich
Democratic

=== General election results ===
Ohio's 10th Congressional District election, 2000
Party	Candidate	Votes	%
Democratic	Dennis Kucinich (Incumbent)	167,093	75.0
Republican	Bill Smith	48,940	22.0
Libertarian	Ron Petrie	6,761	3.0
Total votes		222,794	100
Democratic hold			

== District 11 ==
2000 Ohio's 11th congressional district election
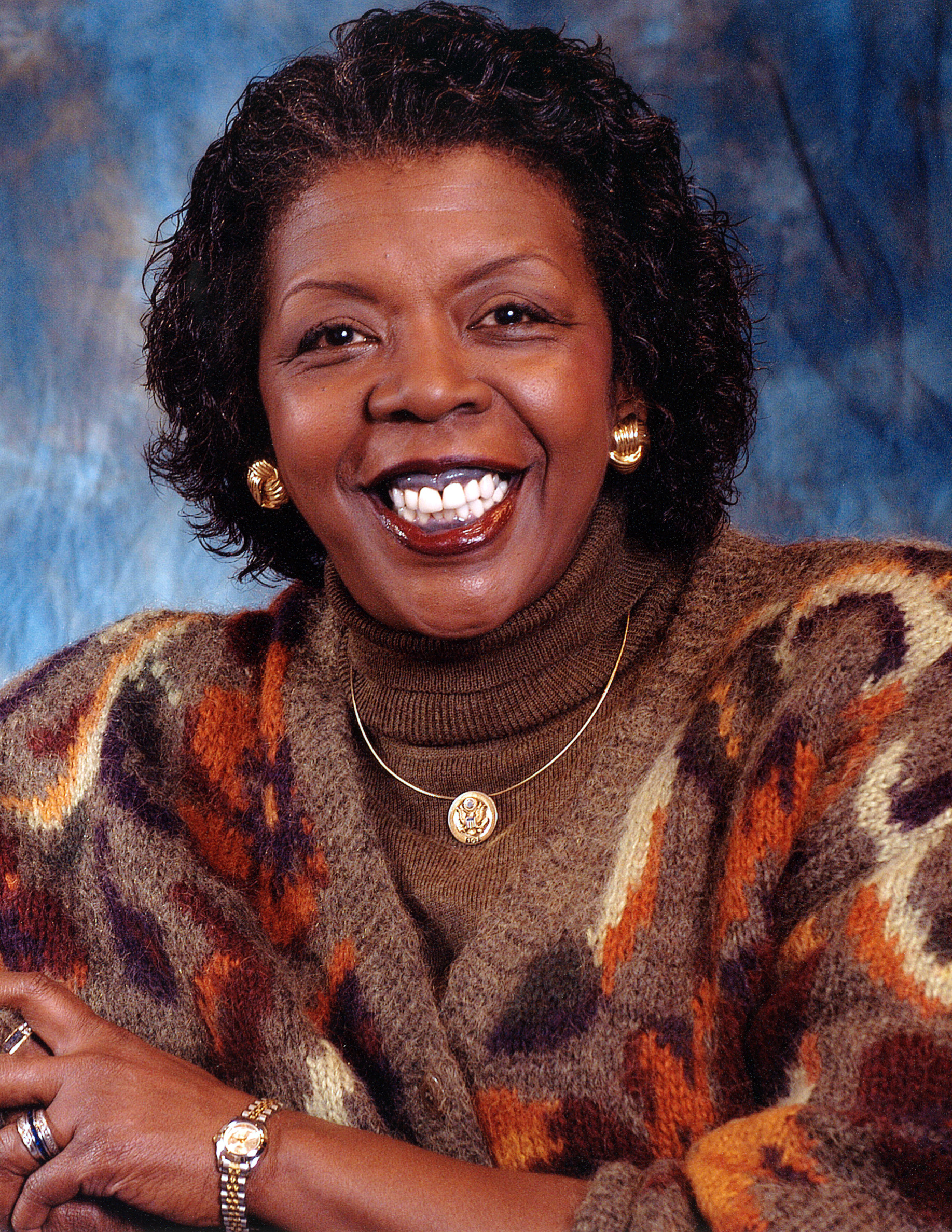

Nominee	Stephanie Tubbs Jones	James Sykora
Party	Democratic	Republican
Popular vote	166,691	22,324
Percentage	84.8%	11.4%
- County results Jones: 80–90%
U.S. Representative before election
Stephanie Tubbs Jones
Democratic
Elected U.S. Representative
Stephanie Tubbs Jones
Democratic

=== General election results ===
Ohio's 11th Congressional District election, 2000
Party	Candidate	Votes	%
Democratic	Stephanie Tubbs Jones (Incumbent)	166,691	84.8
Republican	James Sykora	22,324	11.4
Libertarian	Joel Turner	4,289	2.2
Natural Law	Sonja Glavina	3,555	1.8
Total votes		196,859	100
Democratic hold			

== District 12 ==
2000 Ohio's 12th congressional district election
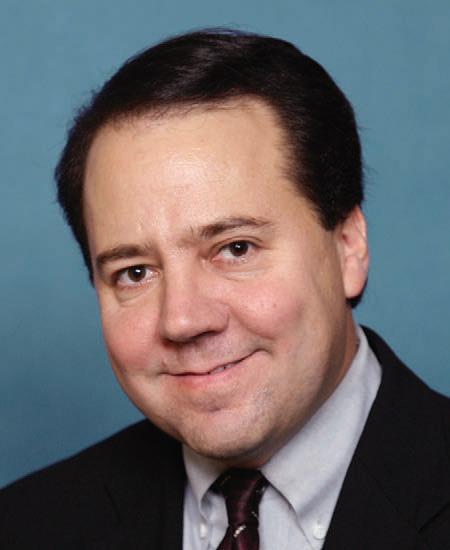

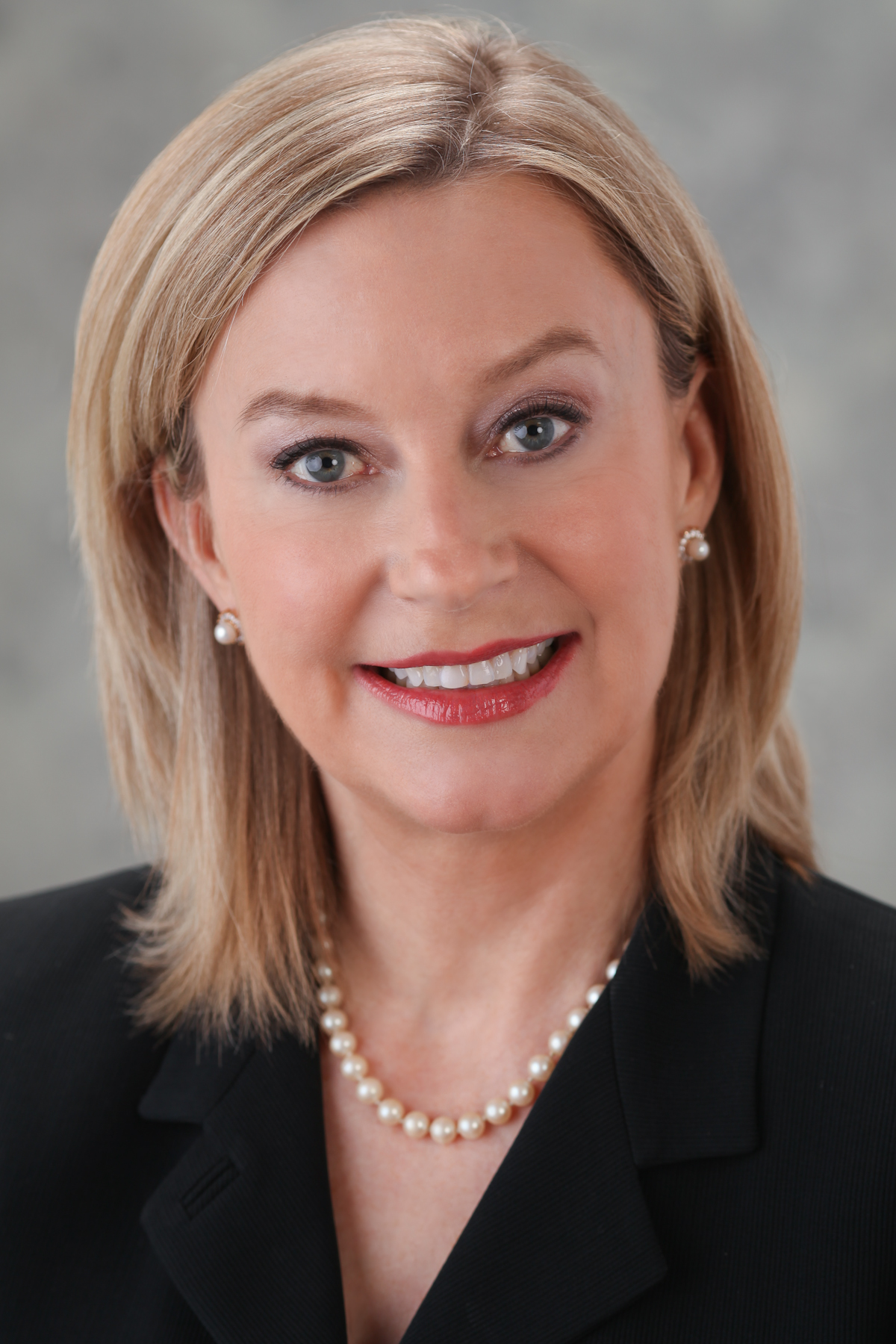
Nominee	Pat Tiberi	Maryellen O'Shaughnessy
Party	Republican	Democratic
Popular vote	139,242	115,432
Percentage	52.9%	43.8%
- County results Tiberi: 60–70% O'shaughnessy: 50–60%
U.S. Representative before election
John Kasich
Republican
Elected U.S. Representative
Pat Tiberi
Republican

=== General election ===
==== Polling ====
Poll source	Date(s)	Sample size	Margin of error	Pat Tiberi (R)	Maryellen O'Shaughnessy (D)	Other / undecided (Note: Calculated by taking the difference of 100% and all other candidates combined.)
SurveyUSA	October 22, 2000	500	—	56%	41%	3%

==== Results ====
Ohio's 12th Congressional District election, 2000
Party	Candidate	Votes	%
Republican	Pat Tiberi	139,242	52.9
Democratic	Maryellen O'Shaughnessy	115,432	43.8
Libertarian	Nick Hogan	4,546	1.7
Natural Law	Gregory Richey	2,600	1.0
Independent	Charles Jordan	1,566	0.6
Total votes		263,386	100
Republican hold			

== District 13 ==
2000 Ohio's 13th congressional district election
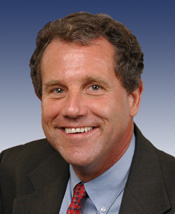

Nominee	Sherrod Brown	Rick Jeric
Party	Democratic	Republican
Popular vote	170,058	84,295
Percentage	64.6%	32.0%
- County results Brown: 50–60% 60–70% 70–80%
U.S. Representative before election
Sherrod Brown
Democratic
Elected U.S. Representative
Sherrod Brown
Democratic

=== General election results ===
Ohio's 13th Congressional District election, 2000
Party	Candidate	Votes	%
Democratic	Sherrod Brown (Incumbent)	170,058	64.6
Republican	Rick Jeric	84,295	32.0
Libertarian	Michael Chmura	5,837	2.2
Natural Law	David Kluter	3,108	1.2
Total votes		263,298	100
Democratic hold			

== District 14 ==
2000 Ohio's 14th congressional district election
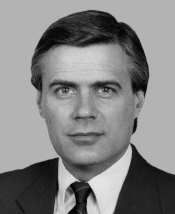

Nominee	Thomas C. Sawyer	Rick Wood
Party	Democratic	Republican
Popular vote	149,184	71,432
Percentage	64.8%	31.0%
- County results Sawyer: 60–70%
U.S. Representative before election
Thomas C. Sawyer
Democratic
Elected U.S. Representative
Thomas C. Sawyer
Democratic

=== General election results ===
Ohio's 14th Congressional District election, 2000
Party	Candidate	Votes	%
Democratic	Thomas C. Sawyer (Incumbent)	149,184	64.8
Republican	Rick Wood	71,432	31.0
Libertarian	William Mcdaniel, Jr.	5,603	2.4
Natural Law	Walter Keith	3,869	1.7
Total votes		230,088	100
Democratic hold			

== District 15 ==
2000 Ohio's 15th congressional district election
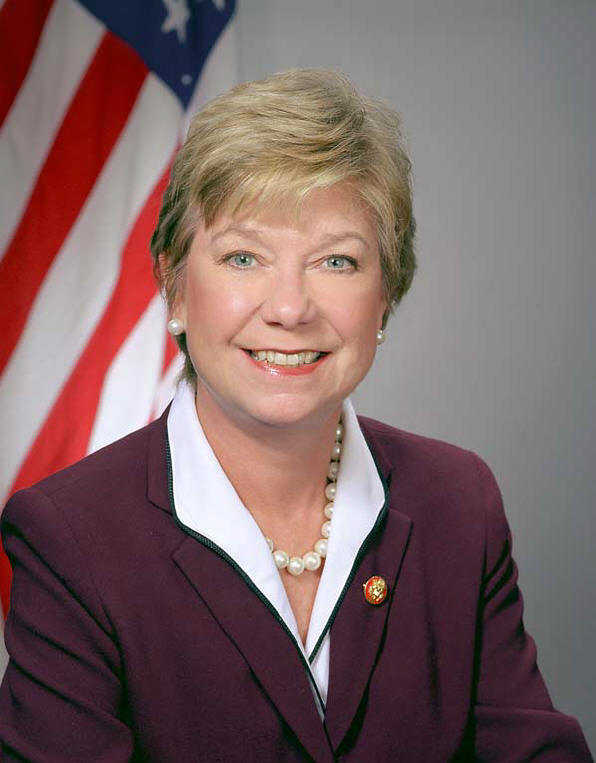

Nominee	Deborah Pryce	Bill Buckel
Party	Republican	Democratic
Popular vote	156,792	64,805
Percentage	67.5%	27.9%
- County results Pryce: 60–70% 70–80%
U.S. Representative before election
Deborah Pryce
Republican
Elected U.S. Representative
Deborah Pryce
Republican

=== General election results ===
Ohio's 15th Congressional District election, 2000
Party	Candidate	Votes	%
Republican	Deborah Pryce (Incumbent)	156,792	67.5
Democratic	Bill Buckel	64,805	27.9
Libertarian	Scott Smith	10,700	4.6
Total votes		232,297	100
Republican hold			

== District 16 ==
2000 Ohio's 16th congressional district election
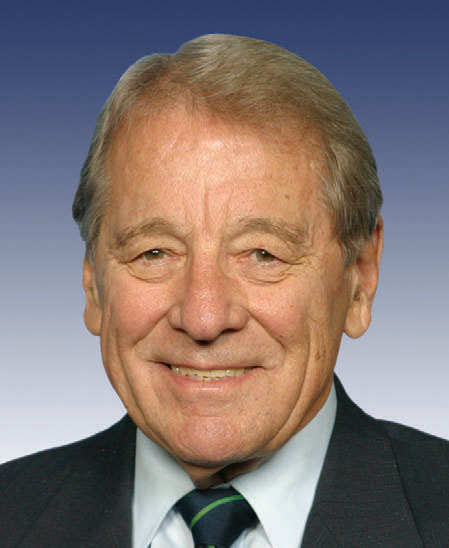

Nominee	Ralph Regula	William Smith
Party	Republican	Democratic
Popular vote	162,294	62,709
Percentage	69.2%	26.8%
- County results Regula: 60–70% 70–80% 80–90%
U.S. Representative before election
Ralph Regula
Republican
Elected U.S. Representative
Ralph Regula
Republican

=== General election results ===
Ohio's 16th Congressional District election, 2000
Party	Candidate	Votes	%
Republican	Ralph Regula (Incumbent)	162,294	69.2
Democratic	William Smith	62,709	26.8
Libertarian	Richard Shetler	6,166	2.6
Natural Law	Brad Graef	3,231	1.4
Total votes		234,400	100
Republican hold			

== District 17 ==
2000 Ohio's 17th congressional district election
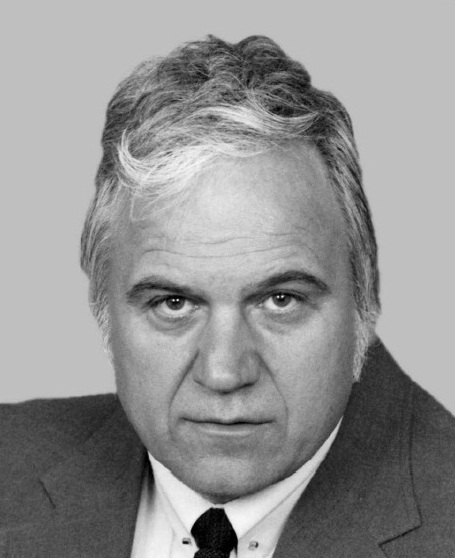

Nominee	James Traficant	Paul Alberty	Randy Walter
Party	Democratic	Republican	Independent
Popular vote	120,333	54,751	51,793
Percentage	50.0%	22.7%	21.5%
- County results Traficant: 40–50% 50–60%
U.S. Representative before election
Jim Traficant
Democratic
Elected U.S. Representative
James Traficant
Democratic

=== General election results ===
Ohio's 17th Congressional District election, 2000
Party	Candidate	Votes	%
Democratic	James Traficant	120,333	50.0
Republican	Paul Alberty	54,751	22.7
Independent	Randy Walter	51,793	21.5
Independent	Lou D`Apolito	9,568	4.0
Natural Law	Carol McCoy	3,154	1.3
Libertarian	Milton Norris	1,278	0.5
Total votes		240,877	100
Democratic hold			

== District 18 ==
2000 Ohio's 18th congressional district election
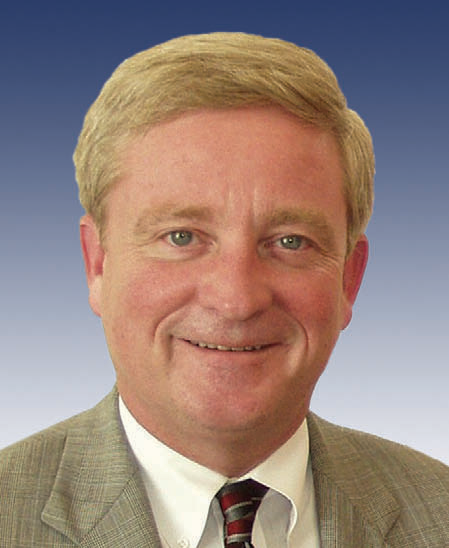

Nominee	Bob Ney	Marc Guthrie
Party	Republican	Democratic
Popular vote	152,325	79,232
Percentage	64.4%	33.5%
- County results Ney: 40–50% 50–60% 60–70% 70–80%
U.S. Representative before election
Bob Ney
Republican
Elected U.S. Representative
Bob Ney
Republican

=== General election results ===
Ohio's 18th Congressional District election, 2000
Party	Candidate	Votes	%
Republican	Bob Ney (Incumbent)	152,325	64.4
Democratic	Marc Guthrie	79,232	33.5
Libertarian	John Bargar, Sr.	4,948	2.1
Total votes		236,505	100
Republican hold			

== District 19 ==
2000 Ohio's 19th congressional district election
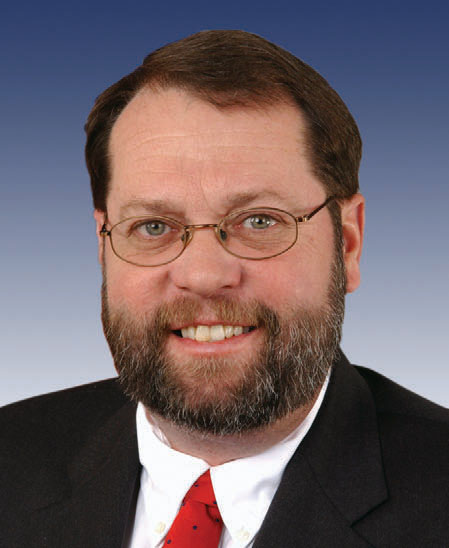

Nominee	Steve LaTourette	Dale Virgil Blanchard
Party	Republican	Democratic
Popular vote	174,262	70,429
Percentage	69.2%	28.0%
- County results Latourette: 60–70% 70–80%
U.S. Representative before election
Steve LaTourette
Republican
Elected U.S. Representative
Steve LaTourette
Republican

=== General election results ===
Ohio's 19th Congressional District election, 2000
Party	Candidate	Votes	%
Republican	Steve LaTourette (Incumbent)	174,262	69.2
Democratic	Dale Virgil Blanchard	70,429	28.0
Libertarian	Sid Stone	6,957	2.8
Total votes		251,648	100
Republican hold			
