= Steve Chabot =

American politician (born 1953)

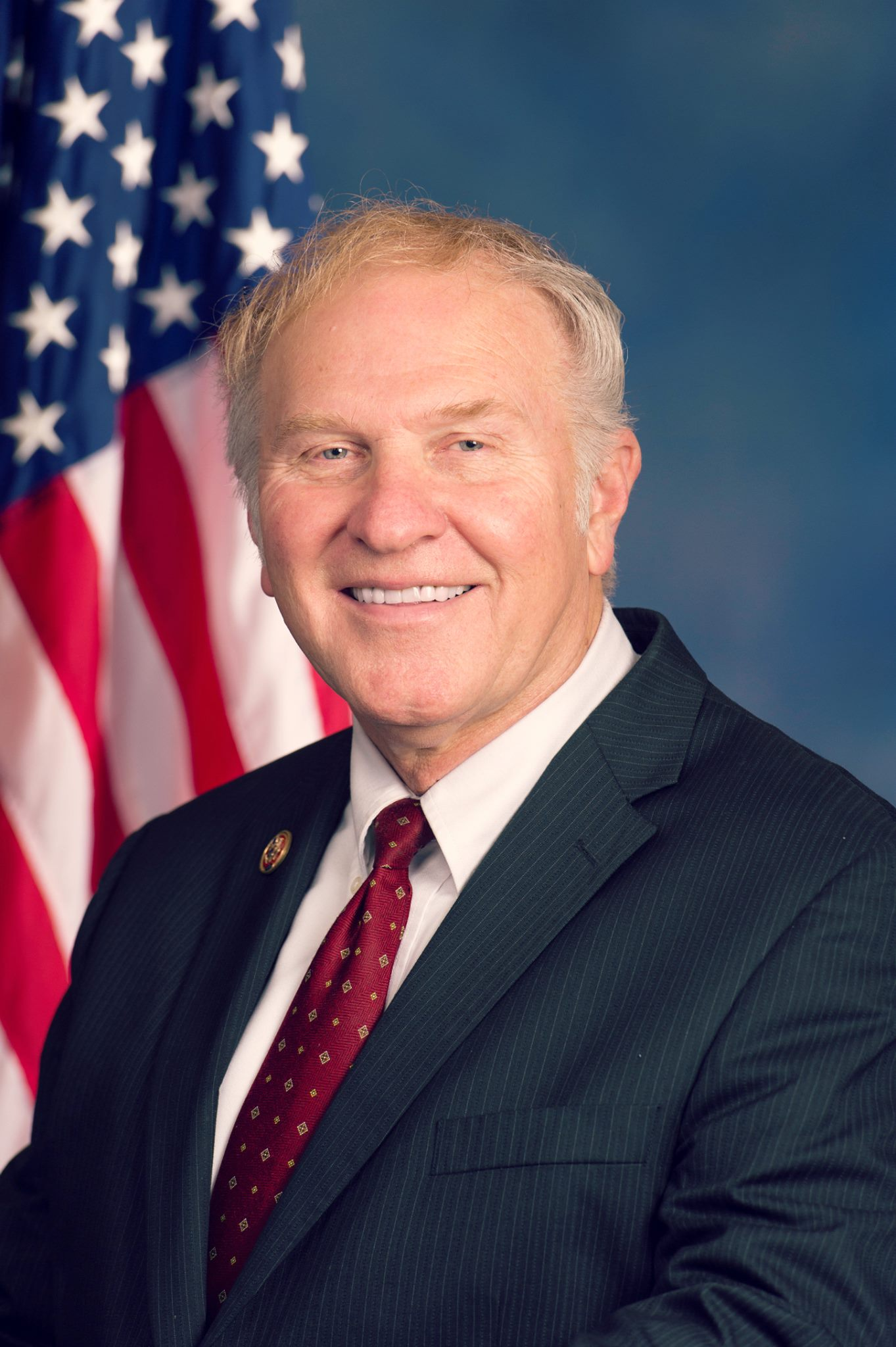

Ranking Member of the House Small Business Committee
- In office January 3, 2019 – January 3, 2021
- Preceded by: Nydia Velázquez
- Succeeded by: Blaine Luetkemeyer

Chair of the House Small Business Committee
- In office January 3, 2015 – January 3, 2019
- Preceded by: Sam Graves
- Succeeded by: Nydia Velázquez

Member of the U.S. House of Representatives from Ohio's 1st district
- In office January 3, 2011 – January 3, 2023
- Preceded by: Steve Driehaus
- Succeeded by: Greg Landsman
- In office January 3, 1995 – January 3, 2009
- Preceded by: David S. Mann
- Succeeded by: Steve Driehaus

Personal details
- Born: Steven Joseph Chabot; January 22, 1953 (age 73) Cincinnati, Ohio, U.S.
- Party: Republican
- Spouse: Donna Daly (m. 1973)
- Children: 2
- Education: College of William and Mary (BA); Northern Kentucky University (JD)
- Chabot's voice Chabot supporting legislation to combat opioid abuse. Recorded May 10, 2016

Steven Joseph Chabot (/ˈʃæbət/ SHAB-ət; born January 22, 1953) is an American politician and lawyer who represented Ohio's 1st congressional district in the United States House of Representatives from 1995 to 2009 and again from 2011 to 2023. A member of the Republican Party, he lost his 2008 reelection bid to Democrat Steve Driehaus, before reclaiming his seat in 2010, and losing his 2022 reelection bid to Democrat Greg Landsman. Until his second election loss, he was the dean of Ohio's GOP delegation to the House of Representatives, after the retirement of former Speaker John Boehner.

== Early life, education, and pre-political career ==
Chabot was born in 1953 in Cincinnati, Ohio, the son of Gerard Joseph and Doris Leona (née Tilley) Chabot; paternally, he is of French-Canadian descent. He graduated from La Salle High School in Cincinnati in 1971, and then from the College of William and Mary in 1975, earning a Bachelor of Arts in physical education. He went on to obtain a Juris Doctor degree from Northern Kentucky University Salmon P. Chase College of Law in 1978. He worked as an elementary school teacher in 1975–1976 while taking law classes at night. Chabot also taught political science at the University of Cincinnati and chaired the Boy Scouts of Cincinnati.

As a practicing attorney from 1978 to 1994, Chabot handled domestic disputes and the drafting of wills as a sole practitioner. He operated out of a small law office in Westwood.

== Early political career ==
Chabot ran unsuccessfully for the Cincinnati City Council as an independent candidate in 1979 and as a Republican in 1983. He won a seat in 1985 as a Republican and was reelected for the next four years. In 1988, he ran for the U.S. House of Representatives against seven-term incumbent Democrat Tom Luken, who defeated him, 56–44%. In 1990 he was appointed a Commissioner of Hamilton County, Ohio, and was elected later that year and again in 1992, holding that office until 1994.

== U.S. House of Representatives ==
=== Elections ===
In 1994, Chabot ran for the U.S. House again and defeated Democratic incumbent David S. Mann of Ohio's 1st congressional district, 56%–44%. In 1996, he defeated Democrat Mark Longabaugh, a member of the Cincinnati City Council, 54%–43%. In 1998, he defeated Cincinnati Mayor Roxanne Qualls, 53% to 47%. In the series of debates during that campaign, Qualls criticized Chabot for not funneling enough federal spending to his home district. Chabot countered that he would not support "wasteful or unnecessary" federal programs. In 2000, he defeated City Councilman John Cranley 53–44%. In 2002, he defeated Greg Harris with 65% of the vote. In 2004, he defeated Harris again, with 60% of the vote.

==== 2006 ====
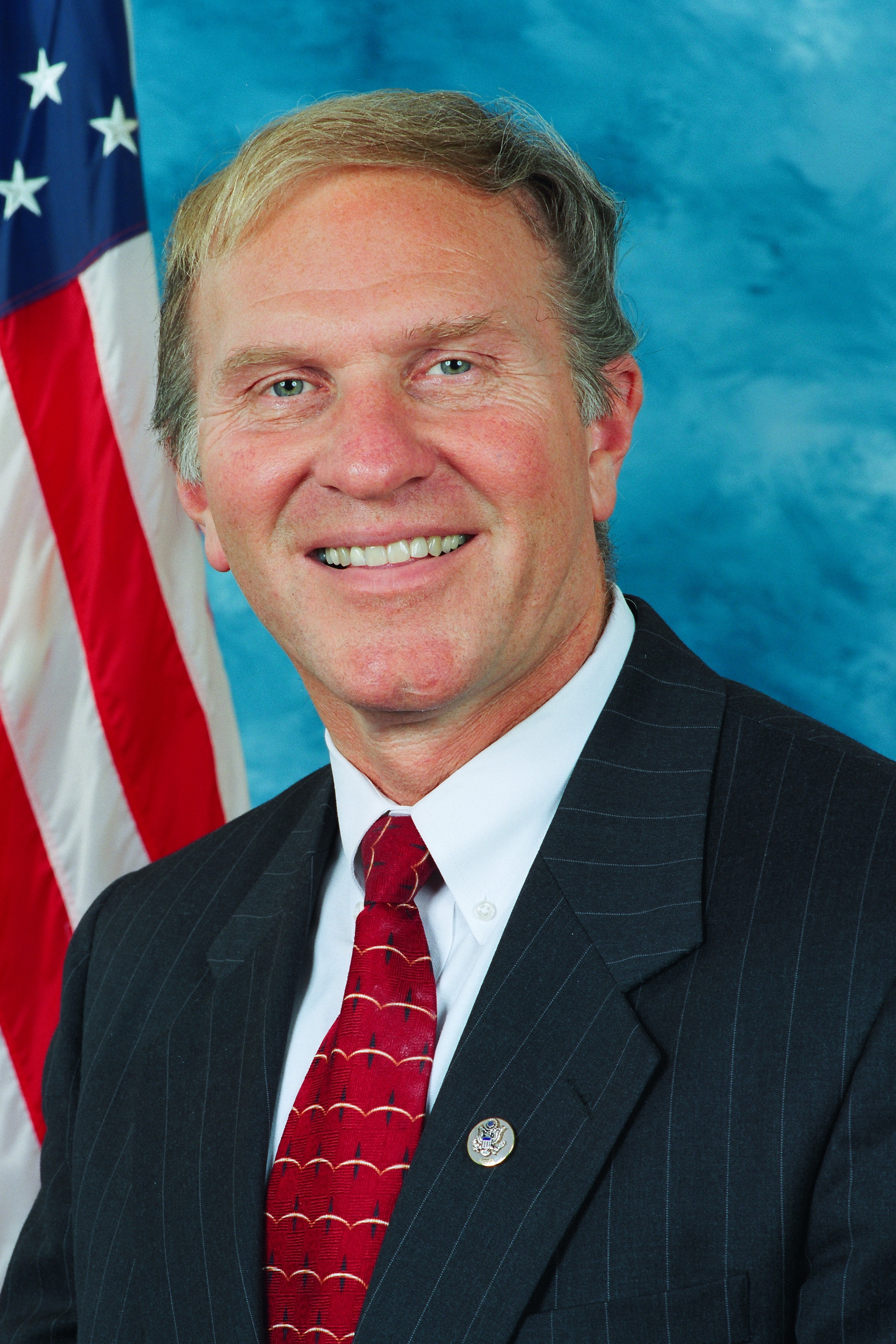
Chabot during the 109th Congress

Chabot defeated Democratic challenger John Cranley again, this time by a narrower margin of 52–48%.

==== 2008 ====
Chabot lost to State Representative Steve Driehaus, 52%–48%.

==== 2010 ====
In a rematch, Chabot defeated Driehaus, Libertarian Jim Berns, and Green Party nominee Richard Stevenson. Chabot won with 52% of the vote.

==== 2012 ====
Chabot defeated Democratic nominee Jeff Sinnard, 58%–38%, with Green nominee Rich Stevenson and Libertarian nominee Jim Berns picking up the balance. He was helped by the 2010 round of redistricting, which shifted the majority of heavily Republican Warren County to the 1st Congressional District.

==== 2014 ====
Chabot defeated Democratic nominee Fred Kundrata, 63%–37%.

==== 2016 ====
Chabot defeated Democratic nominee Michele Young, 59%–41%.

==== 2018 ====
Chabot defeated Democratic nominee Aftab Pureval, 51%–48%. Libertarian nominee Dirk Kubala took the remainder of the vote.

==== 2020 ====
Chabot defeated Democratic nominee Kate Schroder, 52%–45%. Libertarian nominee Kevin David Kahn took the remainder of the vote.

==== 2022 ====
Chabot's district became considerably more Democratic in redistricting. It now includes the entire city of Cincinnati; previously the eastern portion had been in the heavily Republican 2nd district. Chabot had considered retiring but ultimately ran for re-election as he believed Republicans would write off the seat unless he ran again. In the general election, he lost in an upset to Democratic nominee Greg Landsman, a member of the Cincinnati City Council. Chabot was the last surviving member of the "Republican Revolution" of 1994 who was still serving in Congress. Afterwards, Chabot stated that he would not run for the seat in 2024.

=== Tenure ===
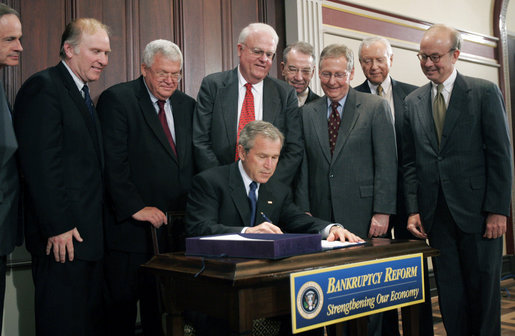
Chabot watches President George W. Bush sign the Bankruptcy Abuse Prevention and Consumer Protection Act in 2005

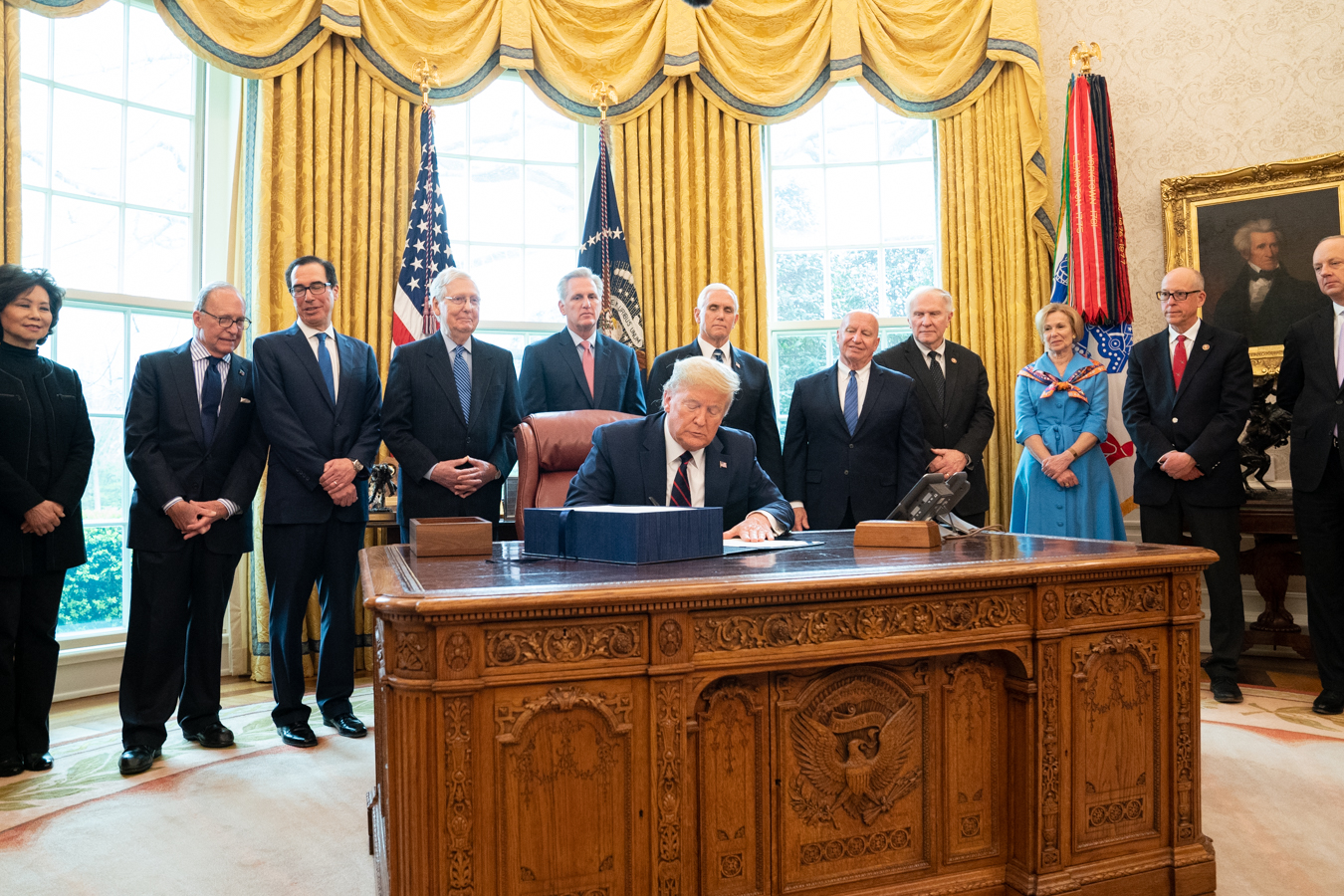
Chabot watches President Donald Trump sign the CARES Act in 2020

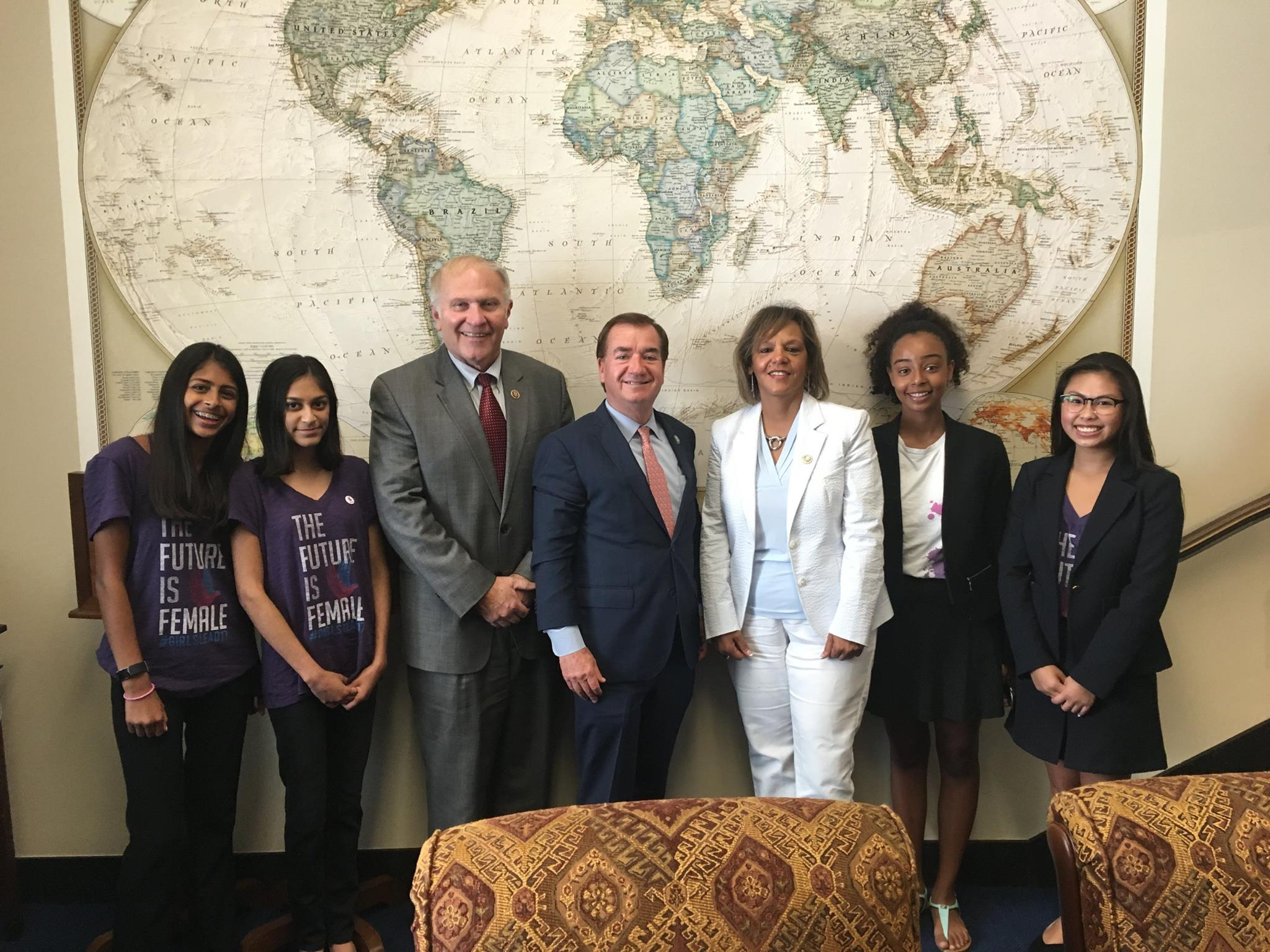
U.S. House Foreign Affairs Committee Chair Ed Royce, members Steve Chabot and Robin Kelly in 2017 celebrate legislation to help educate more girls

In 1999, Chabot served as one of the House managers in the impeachment trial of Bill Clinton.

On December 18, 2019, Chabot voted against both articles of impeachment against President Donald Trump. Of the 195 Republicans who voted, 185 voted against both articles and 10 Republicans voted for impeachment.

On January 7, 2021, Chabot objected to the certification of the 2020 US presidential election results in Congress based on false claims of voter fraud.

In March 2021, he voted against the American Rescue Plan Act of 2021.

In August 2021, Business Insider reported that Chabot had violated the Stop Trading on Congressional Knowledge (STOCK) Act of 2012, a federal transparency and conflict-of-interest law, by failing to properly disclose an exchange of stock in Allergan plc and AbbVie Inc. worth up to $30,000.

=== Committee assignments ===
- Committee on Foreign Affairs
  - Subcommittee on Asia and the Pacific
  - Subcommittee on the Middle East and South Asia
- Committee on the Judiciary
  - Subcommittee on the Constitution
  - Subcommittee on Intellectual Property, Competition, and the Internet
- Committee on Small Business

=== Caucus memberships ===
- Congressional Taiwan Caucus (co-chair)
- House Baltic Caucus
- House Cambodia Caucus
- Republican Study Committee

== Electoral history ==
Ohio's 1st congressional district: Results 1988, 1994–2022
Year	Winner	Votes	Pct	Runner-up	Votes	Pct	3rd Party	Party	Votes	Pct	3rd Party	Party	Votes	Pct	
1988	Tom Luken (inc.)	117,682	57%	Steve Chabot	90,738	43%									
1994	Steve Chabot	92,997	56%	David S. Mann (inc.)	72,822	44%									
1996	Steve Chabot (inc.)	118,324	54%	Mark Longabaugh	94,719	43%	John Halley	Natural Law	5,381	2%					
1998	Steve Chabot (inc.)	92,421	53%	Roxanne Qualls	82,003	47%									
2000	Steve Chabot (inc.)	116,768	53%	John Cranley	98,328	45%	David Groshoff	Libertarian	3,399	2%	Richard Stevenson	Natural Law	1,933	1%	
2002	Steve Chabot (inc.)	110,760	65%	Greg Harris	60,168	35%									
2004	Steve Chabot (inc.)	173,430	60%	Greg Harris	116,235	40%									*
2006	Steve Chabot (inc.)	105,680	52%	John Cranley	96,584	48%									
2008	Steve Driehaus	155,455	52%	Steve Chabot (inc.)	140,683	48%									*
2010	Steve Chabot	103,770	52%	Steve Driehaus (inc.)	92,672	45%	Jim Berns	Libertarian	3,076	2%	Richard Stevenson	Natural Law	2,000	1%	
2012	Steve Chabot (inc.)	201,907	58%	Jeff Sinnard	131,490	38%	Jim Berns	Libertarian	9,674	3%	Richard Stevenson	Green Party	6,645	2%	
2014	Steve Chabot (inc.)	124,779	63%	Fred Kundrata	72,604	37%									
2016	Steve Chabot (inc.)	210,014	59%	Michele Young	144,644	41%									
2018	Steve Chabot (inc.)	154,409	51%	Aftab Pureval	141,118	47%	Dirk Kubala	Libertarian	5,339	2%					
2020	Steve Chabot (inc.)	199,560	52%	Kate Schroder	172,022	45%	Kevin Kahn	Libertarian	13,692	4%					
2022	Greg Landsman	156,416	53%	Steve Chabot (inc.)	140,058	47%									

* Write-in and minor candidate notes: In 2004, Rich Stevenson received 198 votes. In 2008, Eric Wilson received 85 votes and Rich Stevenson received 67 votes. In 2020, Kiumars Kiani received 11 votes.

== Political positions ==
During the presidency of Donald Trump, Chabot voted in line with Trump's stated position 93.1% of the time. As of August 2022, Chabot had voted in line with Joe Biden's stated position 16.4% of the time.

=== Health care ===
Chabot authored a bill prohibiting a form of late-term abortion called partial-birth abortion, referred to in some medical literature by its less common name of intact dilation and extraction. President George W. Bush signed the bill into law on November 5, 2003.

Chabot favors repealing the Affordable Care Act (Obamacare). He favors market-based reforms that he claims will offer American families more lower-cost options. He supported the March 2017 version of the American Health Care Act, the GOP's replacement for Obamacare. On May 4, 2017, Chabot voted to repeal the Affordable Care Act and pass the American Health Care Act.

=== Environment ===
On the topic of man-made climate change, Chabot has said, "the evidence concerning man-made climate change is far from conclusive". He has said cap-and-trade is an "extreme proposal" that would harm the economy.

=== Other ===
In 1999, Chabot was one of the managers appointed to conduct the impeachment proceedings of President Bill Clinton.

On August 22, 2011, Chabot asked Cincinnati police to confiscate cameras being used by private citizens to record a town-hall meeting, even as media television cameras recorded the incident. YouTube videos of the incident provided wide awareness of it, and the participating police officer was later disciplined.

In 2002, Chabot advocated teaching intelligent design alongside the theory of evolution by natural selection in Ohio high schools.

Chabot has called for ending logging subsidies in the Tongass National Forest, and promoted relations with Taiwan. In 2002, he helped spearhead the local campaign against building a light rail system in Hamilton County.

As of 2016, Chabot had traveled on congressional fact-finding missions to 46 countries at a cost of $200,000.

== Personal life ==
Chabot lives with his wife Donna in Westwood. They have two children and a grandson.

Chabot is a practicing Roman Catholic.

U.S. House of Representatives
Preceded by David Mann	Member of the U.S. House of Representatives from Ohio's 1st congressional district 1995–2009	Succeeded by Steve Driehaus
Preceded by Nydia Velázquez	Ranking Member of the House Small Business Committee; 2007–2009	Succeeded by Sam Graves
Preceded by Steve Driehaus	Member of the U.S. House of Representatives from Ohio's 1st congressional district 2011–2023	Succeeded by Greg Landsman
Preceded by Sam Graves	Chair of the House Small Business Committee; 2015–2019	Succeeded by Nydia Velázquez
Preceded by Nydia Velázquez	Ranking Member of the House Small Business Committee; 2019–2021	Succeeded by Blaine Luetkemeyer
U.S. order of precedence (ceremonial)
Preceded by Bart Gordon as Former U.S. Representative	Order of precedence of the United States as Former U.S. Representative	Succeeded by Luis Gutierrez as Former U.S. Representative
