= Dwight Tillery =

American politician

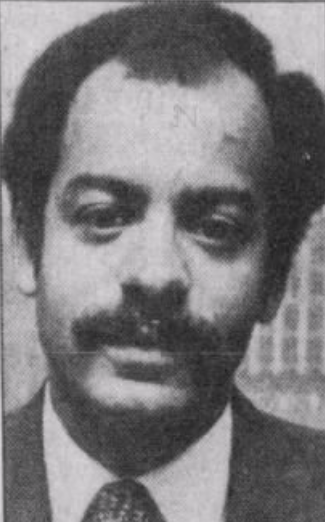
- Tillery in 1984

65th Mayor of Cincinnati
- In office 1991–1993
- Preceded by: David S. Mann
- Succeeded by: Roxanne Qualls

Personal details
- Born: March 10, 1948 (age 78) Cincinnati, Ohio, U.S.
- Party: Democratic
- Education: University of Cincinnati (BA); University of Michigan Law School (JD)

Dwight Tillery (born March 10, 1948) is an American politician and social justice activist with more than 50 years of service working towards equity for African Americans and other minorities in politics, business and public health. His leadership transformed the lives of Black residents in the city of Cincinnati in the areas of racial justice, education, civics, community health and politics. Tillery was the first popularly elected Black Mayor in Cincinnati, Ohio, serving from 1991 to 1993, and he served on Cincinnati City Council for eight years. Tillery co-founded the United Black Students Association at the University of Cincinnati, was the Founder, President and CEO of The Center for Closing the Health Gap, and co-founded The Black Agenda of Cincinnati. Tillery also served as an adjunct professor at the University of Cincinnati and at Miami University.

== Early life ==
Tillery grew up in Cincinnati's West End and Evanston and attended public schools, graduating from Withrow High School in 1966.

== Education ==
Tillery received a Bachelor of Arts in political science from the University of Cincinnati in 1970. At UC he co-founded the United Black Association, now the United Black Students Association, one of the first Black organizations to receive funding from the university. Tillery and his classmates’ activism was instrumental in the foundation of UC's African American Studies department and recruitment of Black faculty members and trustees. Tillery and other members of the association pushed for creation of an African American Cultural and Resource Center, which would finally be established in 1990. Tillery received his Juris Doctor at University of Michigan Law School in 1972. He also received an Honorary Doctorate of Technical Letters from Cincinnati Technical College in 1992.

== Career ==
Tillery is licensed to practice law in the State of Ohio, as well as the Federal District Court, the Sixth Circuit Appellate Court, and the United States Supreme Court. He joined the law firm of Waite, Schneider, Bayless and Chesley Co., L.P.A. in 1991, and was the founding partner at the law firm of Tillery and Associates in 1977. He served as Assistant Solicitor for the City of Cincinnati from 1973 to 1974 and as Senior Assistant Attorney General of Ohio, 1983 to 1985. He was also a consultant for the Office of Attorney General, Columbus in 1985. He served for 2 years as the Vice President of the National Bar Association. He was a delegate to the 6th Circuit Judicial Conference from 1981 to 1985. Tillery co-founded the Black Lawyers Association of Cincinnati in 1974. He was elected twice as Vice President of the National Bar Association.

Tillery was an Adjunct Assistant Professor of Law and an assistant professor of African American Studies at the University of Cincinnati from 1975 to 1977, where he created the groundbreaking course “The Law and Black People," and he was an assistant professor of Business Law at Miami University in 1985. He also served as University of Cincinnati Vice President from 1974 to 1977, and as Law School Consultant for UC from 1977 to 1978. The Tillery Fellowship was established in 2016 to recognize and support Master's of Public Health students dedicated to improving public and community health for vulnerable populations.

Tillery became the first popularly elected Mayor of the city of Cincinnati in 1991 and served until 1993. As Mayor, he established a task force on small business. He was elected as Mayor after serving for ten months as a member of the Cincinnati City Council. He again served on the Cincinnati City Council from 1993 to 1998. He served as the Chair of the City Council's Finance Committee, Vice Chair of the Law and Public Safety Committee and a member of the Community Development, Housing and Zoning Committee. A major focus of Tillery's political career was to increase involvement of the Black community in economic, political, and educational development. As Mayor, he created the Mayor's Commission on Children, Reshaping Youth Priorities, which was the first anti-violence initiative targeting youth offered by the Cincinnati Health Department. He played a key role in establishing a venture capital fund of eleven million dollars for African American businesses, and he assisted in establishing a mentoring program for minority businesses. One of the most significant businesses started through these efforts was the Blue Chip Broadcasting Company, which ultimately licensed 13 radio stations which was valued at $188 million when it merged with the Urban One family of companies in 1995. Mayor Tillery also enabled the first-time appointments of minorities to the operating boards of the OHIO Gas & Electric Co. and the Cincinnati Bell Telephone Company. As a City Council member, Tillery founded Grassroots Academy, an organization which taught hundreds of people of “low to moderate income” leadership skills, strategic planning, understanding government and identifying resources, thus empowering residents to help their communities. In response to concerns that the Avondale Community (a predominantly Black neighborhood) did not have a grocery store, Tillery persuaded City Council to provide the resources to a group of Avondale ministers interested in revitalizing the Avondale Town Center. He also negotiated the appointment of Cincinnati's first Black Assistant Police Chief.

In 2004, Tillery founded The Center for Closing the Health Gap in order to address significant health differences between African American, Latino and White Appalachian populations. The Center quickly gained national acclaim as a model for addressing health disparities. Tillery served as Founder, President and CEO until 2019. The center works with more than 100 different organizations, including the City Council, the Cincinnati chapter of the National Action Network, the Baptist Ministers Conference, and the Black Nurses Association of Greater Cincinnati as well as a host of other universities, hospitals, government associations and businesses. Some of the center's initiatives include the Do Right! Campaign which works with individuals to adopt healthier lifestyle choices regarding diet and exercise, the Cincinnati Fresh Food Retail Financing Fund and the City of Cincinnati Food Access Task force, which works to address the issue of food deserts in the city, and an Annual Health Expo attended by thousands which provides free health screenings for early detection of more than 20 health issues. The center also works to raise awareness of health disparities, increase cultural competency and encourage diversity in the health care provider work force.

In 2016, Tillery was the co-convener of The Black Agenda Cincinnati. Among other things, the Black Agenda partnered with The Cincinnati Herald newspaper to create Cincinnati Black History, a digital platform that provides a space for people to “share and preserve unfiltered stories of Black Heritage.”

== Appointments ==
Assistant City Solicitor, Cincinnati

Fellow Member, Cincinnati Scholarship Foundation 1974-1975

Assistant Executive Vice President for Administration and Associate University Council 1974

Adjunct assistant professor of law and adjunct assistant professor of Afro-American Studies 1975-1977

Vice Chair, Cincinnati Human Rights Commission 1975-1980

Member, Cincinnati Board Health 1976-1980

Chair, Cincinnati Board of Health's Advisory Council on Youth Violence 1991-1993

Vice Chair, Ohio State Personnel Board of Review – 2009-2012

Member, Board of Directors, W. Montague Cobb/National Medical Association (NMA) Health Institute 2012

Host, “The Calling” talk show on Radio One 2018–2019.

Member, Guiding Coalition, Urban League of Southwestern Ohio

Chair, Ad Hoc Committee on Community Engagement, W. Montague Cobb/National Medical Association (NMA) Health Institute 2015-2023

Trustee, Retirement Board of the City of Cincinnati *DATES* <CNCLBLRB> Can we get this from Dwight?

Vice President, National Bar Association

== Awards ==
1992 honorary degree from Cincinnati Technical College

1992 University of Cincinnati President's Award for Excellence

1992 Entrepreneur of the Year Award, Equal Opportunity Center, Ohio Department of Administrative Services

2014 Center for Clinical and Transitional Science and Training Community Health Advocate Award

2015 Urban League of Greater Southwestern Ohio Glorifying the Lions honoree

2016 Georgia E. Beasley Legacy Award, University of Cincinnati

== Memberships ==
- Fellow, American Bar Association
- Lifetime member, National Bar Association
- Member, Cincinnati Bar Association
- Member, Association of Trial Lawyers of America
- Founder and Member, Black Lawyers Association Cincinnati
- Member, University of Cincinnati Men of Metro Service Honorary, 1969
- Omicron Delta Kappa National Honorary Society, University of Cincinnati
- Who's Who Among Students in American Universities and Colleges

Political offices
Preceded by David S. Mann	Mayor of Cincinnati, Ohio; 1991–1993	Succeeded by Roxanne Qualls
