= Roxanne Qualls =

American politician (born 1953)

Vice Mayor of Cincinnati
- In office 2007–2013
- Preceded by: Alicia Reece
- Succeeded by: David S. Mann

Member of the Cincinnati City Council
- In office 2007–2013
- In office 1991–1993

66th Mayor of Cincinnati
- In office 1993–1999
- Preceded by: Dwight Tillery
- Succeeded by: Charlie Luken

Personal details
- Born: March 3, 1953 (age 73) Tacoma, Washington, U.S.
- Party: Democratic
- Other political affiliations: Charter
- Spouse: John Gunnison-Wiseman
- Occupation: Realtor
- Profession: Politician

Roxanne Qualls (born March 3, 1953) is an American politician from Ohio who served as the 66th Mayor of Cincinnati from 1993 to 1999. A member of the Democratic Party who has long been allied with the Charter Committee, she was Cincinnati's second woman mayor and the city's last mayor under the system in which the mayoralty was awarded to the top vote-getter in Cincinnati City Council elections.

Qualls served on the Cincinnati City Council from 1991 to 1993 and again from 2007 to 2013, including a term as Vice Mayor. She was an unsuccessful candidate for the United States House of Representatives in 1998, losing to incumbent Steve Chabot, and was the Democratic-endorsed candidate in the 2013 Cincinnati mayoral election, in which she lost to John Cranley. She was subsequently a candidate in the November 2013 election for Mayor of Cincinnati, but was defeated by John Cranley.

== Early life and education ==
Qualls was born in Tacoma, Washington, the daughter of a U.S. Air Force officer. Before her family settled in Erlanger, Kentucky, when she was seven years old, she lived in Taiwan, Japan, and New Hampshire.

She attended St. Henry's Grade School in Erlanger and then attended Notre Dame Academy in Park Hills, Kentucky for high school. While at Notre Dame Academy, she participated in the school's chapters of the National Forensics League and National Honor Society. She attended Thomas More College for three semesters majoring in history and then attended the University of Cincinnati in the Department of Urban Planning and Design at the College of Design, Architecture, Art, and Planning.

== Political career ==
=== Early career ===
Before entering elected office, Qualls was the first director of the Northern Kentucky Rape Crisis Center (now the Women's Crisis Center) from 1975 to 1977, and the executive director of Women Helping Women (now the Hamilton County Rape Crisis and Abuse Center) from 1977 to 1979. From 1985 to 1991, she directed the Cincinnati office of Ohio Citizen Action, a public-interest advocacy group, after serving as its associate director from 1983 to 1985. In that role she worked with neighborhood and environmental organizations on local air-quality regulation, the establishment of a city Office of Environmental Management, and the creation of Cincinnati's curbside recycling program.

=== Cincinnati City Council, 1991–1993 ===
Qualls first ran for the nine-member at-large Cincinnati City Council in 1987, finishing 14th, and ran again in 1989, finishing 10th. She was elected in 1991. In her first term she chaired the Intergovernmental Affairs and Environment Committee and worked on transportation policy, workplace-safety standards for city employees, and a "Toxic Sweep" program to train city inspectors in identifying hazardous-materials hazards.

=== Mayor of Cincinnati, 1993–1999 ===
In the 1993 council election Qualls received the most votes of any candidate, which under Cincinnati's then-existing rules made her mayor. She was the top vote-getter again in 1995 and 1997, serving three two-year terms before being barred from running again by term limits.

As mayor, Qualls instituted "Mayor's Night In," a weekly walk-in session at City Hall where residents could meet with her without an appointment, and created a Mayor's Business Expansion and Retention Program. She was a co-founder of ArtWorks, a youth-employment program that produces public art in the region.

One of her initiatives was the Zero Tolerance Initiative: A Campaign to Take Back Our Neighborhoods, an anti-blight program directed at problem landlords, illegal dumping, and nuisance properties. She also founded the Cincinnati Homeownership Partnership, a coalition of lenders and community organizations.

In the late 1990s, Cincinnati joined a wave of municipal lawsuits against firearm manufacturers, alleging that the industry's distribution practices contributed to gun violence. Qualls was an early supporter of the city's litigation.

As the mayor, and during a term as president of the Ohio-Kentucky-Indiana Regional Council of Governments, Qualls was involved in the redesign of Fort Washington Way and in early planning for the city's central riverfront, including site selection for Paul Brown Stadium and Great American Ball Park.

=== 1998 congressional election ===
In 1998, while still mayor, Qualls was the Democratic nominee in Ohio's 1st congressional district against Republican incumbent Steve Chabot. Chabot won re-election with about 53 percent of the vote to Qualls's 47 percent.

=== Return to City Council (2007–2013) ===
On August 8, 2007, the Charter Committee selected Qualls to fill the council seat vacated by Jim Tarbell. She was elected to full two-year terms on council in November 2007, 2009, and 2011, and served as Vice Mayor from 2009 to 2013, chairing the Budget and Finance Committee, the Livable Communities Committee, and the Subcommittee on Major Transportation and Infrastructure Projects.

During this period, Qualls was the leading council advocate for the city's adoption of form-based code zoning. Beginning in 2008 she led trips of city officials and stakeholders to Nashville to study its form-based code, and she chaired the committee that oversaw the city's Plan Build Live Cincinnati initiative. Council unanimously adopted the resulting code in May 2013, with Madisonville, College Hill, Walnut Hills, and Westwood as the first neighborhoods to implement it. During her time as Vice Mayor, the city also adopted its first comprehensive plan in three decades and its Homeless to Homes plan, which led to the construction of new full-service shelters.

Qualls supported the Cincinnati Bell Connector streetcar project, then under construction, and in March 2012 introduced a motion to eliminate minimum off-street parking requirements in Over-the-Rhine and the Central Business District.

=== 2013 mayoral campaign ===
On December 6, 2012, Qualls announced her candidacy for mayor at an event at which the term-limited incumbent, Mark Mallory, endorsed her.

On September 10, 2013, John Cranley led with about 56 percent to Qualls's 37 percent. Cranley defeated Qualls in the November 5 general election, taking roughly 58 percent of the vote.

== Career in academia ==
After leaving office, Qualls held a series of fellowships at Harvard University, including a Loeb Fellowship at the Harvard Graduate School of Design and a fellowship at the Institute of Politics at the Kennedy School of Government, before completing her mid-career MPA in 2002.

== Career in business ==
Qualls currently is an Executive Sales Vice President with Sibcy Cline Realtors in Cincinnati. She received her Ohio real estate license in 2010. She is licensed in Ohio and Kentucky.

== Professional achievements ==
=== Awards and honors ===
- Post-Corbett Award Special Award in Arts Education for Artworks, 1997
- National Homebuilders Association, Public Official of the Year, Region C, 1997
- Project Interchange Seminars in Israel, American Jewish Committee, Women Leaders Exchange, 1997
- Honorary Doctorate, Cincinnati State Technical and Community College, 1996
- Ohio Public Employees Lawyers Association Award for Outstanding Service, 1996
- National Association of Social Workers, Public Official of the Year, State and Cincinnati Region, 1996
- YWCA, Women of Achievement Award, 1994
- Cincinnati Women's Political Caucus, Outstanding Achievement Award, 1994
- Soroptimist Club, Making a Difference for Women Award, 1993
- Girl Scouts Great Rivers Council Woman of Distinction, 1992

=== Continuing education ===
- Loeb Fellowship in Environmental Studies, Graduate School of Design, Harvard University, Class of 2001
- Fellow Institute of Politics, Kennedy School of Government, Harvard University, 2000
- Institute for New Mayors, Harvard University, 1993
- Mayors Institute on City Design, Harvard University, 1996
- Mayors Institute on City Design, University of Virginia, 1997

=== Board memberships ===
- Southwest Ohio Regional Transit Authority (SORTA), Board Member (2007)
- Urban League of Greater Cincinnati, Board Member (2006–2007)
- Vision 2015 Regional Stewardship Council, Board Member (2006–)
- Great Rivers Girl Scout Council, Board Member (2006–2007)
- Housing Opportunities Made Equal, Board Member (2005–2007)
- ArtWorks, Board Member (2005–2007)
- Congress for New Urbanism, Board Member (2000–2008)
- The Holocaust Memorial Library, Hebrew Union College-Jewish Institute of Religion (2000–2002)
- Christ Church Cathedral, Cincinnati, Ohio, Vestry Member (1998–2000)
- National Association of Regional Councils (NARC), First Vice President (1997–1999), Second Vice President (1996–1997), Board Member (1995–1999)
- Cincinnati Youth Collaborative, Co-Chair (1993–1999)
- Friends of Women's Studies (University of Cincinnati), Honorary Chair (1993–1994)
- March of Dimes Health Professional Advisory Committee, Member (1993–1994)
- Ohio•Kentucky•Indiana Regional Council of Governments, President (1995, 1996), First Vice President (1994), Second Vice President (1993), Executive Committee (1992–1999)
- Shuttlesworth Housing Foundation, Advisory Board (1991), Board Member (1989–1991)
- Governor's Commission on the Storage and Use of Toxic and Hazardous Materials, Member (1990)
- Cincinnati Metropolitan Housing Authority, Chairperson (1990–1991), Commissioner (1988–1991)
- Lower Price Hill Task Force, Member (1989–1992)
- Solid Waste Advisory Committee of the State of Ohio, Member (1988–1991)
- Governor's Waste Minimization Task Force of the State of Ohio, Member (1987–1990)
- Solid Waste Task Force of the City of Cincinnati, Chairperson (1988–1990), Member and Vice Chair (1987–1988)
- Hazardous Material Advisory Committee of the City of Cincinnati, Member (1985–1988)
- Rape Services Subcommittee of the Women's Service Implementation Committee of the United Way-Community Chest, Member (1979)
- Cincinnati Committee of the United Methodist Church's Board of Global Ministries Child and Family Justice Project, Vice-Chair (1978–1979)
- Covington Family Health Clinic, Board Member (1976–1977)
- Northern Kentucky Catholic Commission of Social Justice, Board Member (1973–1978)

== See also ==
- Cincinnati City Council
- Ohio's 1st congressional district

== Notes ==
Political offices
Preceded by Dwight Tillery	Mayor of Cincinnati, Ohio; 1993–1999	Succeeded by Charlie Luken
