= David S. Mann =

American politician

David Mann
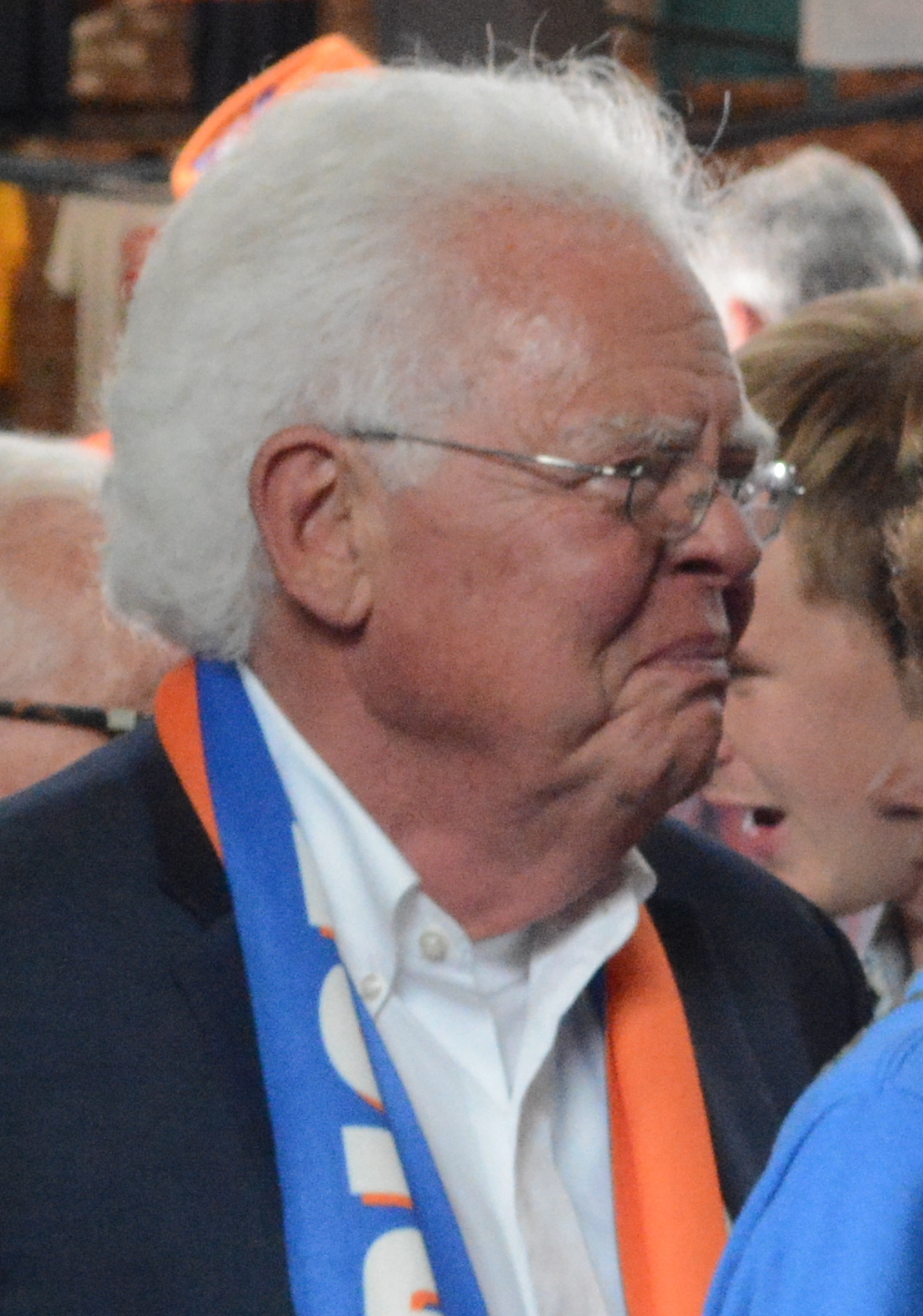
- Mann at an FC Cincinnati event in 2018

Member of the U.S. House of Representatives from Ohio's 1st district
- In office January 3, 1993 – January 3, 1995
- Preceded by: Charlie Luken
- Succeeded by: Steve Chabot

60th and 64th Mayor of Cincinnati
- In office January 3, 1991 – November 30, 1991
- Preceded by: Charlie Luken
- Succeeded by: Dwight Tillery
- In office December 1, 1980 – November 30, 1982
- Preceded by: Ken Blackwell
- Succeeded by: Thomas B. Brush

Vice Mayor of Cincinnati
- In office 2013–2018
- Mayor: John Cranley
- Succeeded by: Christopher Smitherman

Member of the Cincinnati City Council
- In office 2013–2022
- In office 1974–1992
- Preceded by: Jerry Springer

Personal details
- Born: David Scott Mann; September 25, 1939 (age 87) Park Hills, Kentucky, U.S.
- Party: Democratic
- Spouse: Betsy Mann
- Education: Harvard University (BA, LLB)

Military service
- Allegiance: United States
- Branch/service: United States Navy
- Years of service: 1961–1965
- Rank: Lieutenant

David Scott Mann (born September 25, 1939) is an American lawyer and politician. A member of the Democratic Party, he served as the United States representative for Ohio's 1st congressional district from 1993 to 1995. He also served as a member of the Cincinnati City Council from 2013 to 2022 and from 1974 to 1992, during which time he served as mayor of Cincinnati from 1980 to 1982 and again in 1991. Mann ran in the 2021 Cincinnati mayoral election, but lost to Hamilton County Clerk of Courts Aftab Pureval.

== Early life ==
At the time of his birth, Mann's parents resided in Park Hills, a Northern Kentucky suburb of Cincinnati. During his father's service in the United States Navy in World War II, Mann lived with his mother in her hometown of Horse Cave, Kentucky before moving to his father's assignment of the Bronx. His family later settled in Cincinnati.

Mann completed his secondary education at Dixie Heights High School before attending Harvard University on a Navy ROTC scholarship, graduating cum laude in 1961 with a degree in biochemical science. After graduating, Mann served in the Navy from 1961 to 1965. As a lieutenant, Mann served aboard the destroyer USS English during the Cuban Missile Crisis. Mann was a supporter of President John F. Kennedy; Mann credits Kennedy's assassination with convincing him to attend law school instead of medical school so that he could better engage in public service. After his time in the navy, Mann attended Harvard Law School and was awarded a Bachelor of Laws degree magna cum laude in 1968. He was an editor of the Harvard Law Review. Mann returned to the Cincinnati metropolitan area after graduation so that he would be closer to family.

Mann became involved in politics, erecting yard signs for Jack Gilligan's unsuccessful 1968 Senate campaign. He originally intended to help write Gilligan's policy proposals, but the campaign did not accept his request. He later contributed to Tom Luken's campaign for a seat on the Cincinnati City Council.

== First City Council tenure (1974–92) and mayoralties (1980–82 and 1991) ==
Mann was a member of Cincinnati's board of health from 1972 to 1974. Tom Luken encouraged him to run for a seat on the City Council, but Mann's first attempt in 1973 was unsuccessful. The following year, the local Democratic Party appointed Mann to replace Jerry Springer on the Council after Springer resigned due to a prostitution scandal.

While on the council, Mann helped implement a consent decree for the Cincinnati Police Department that placed racial and gender quotas on new hires, which was ruled unconstitutional in 2021. He endorsed former vice president Walter Mondale's candidacy in the 1984 Democratic presidential primaries. Following a 1989 shooting in Louisville, Mann successfully proposed a ban on most semi-automatic firearms within Cincinnati.

Mann served as mayor of Cincinnati twice during his time on the Council. At the time, the office of mayor was not directly elected and was largely ceremonial. His first mayoralty was from December 1980 to November 1982, and his second was from January to November 1991. For his first term, Mann was chosen by fellow Council members to serve as mayor. Prior to his second term, the procedure was changed so that the candidate who won the most votes became mayor. Charlie Luken was the top vote-getter ahead of Mann's second mayoralty, but the Council appointed Mann again after Luken resigned to serve in Congress. Mann left the Council in 1992.

== U.S. Congress (1993–95) ==
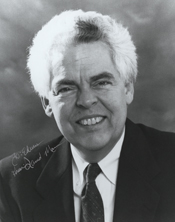
Mann's official congressional portrait, circa 1992–1994

=== 1992 election ===
Ahead of the 1992 House of Representatives elections, incumbent representative Charlie Luken of Ohio's 1st congressional district announced that he would not seek re-election after already winning the June Democratic primary. Mann was term-limited in the City Council and was considering a campaign for a judicial position, but instead decided to run for the congressional seat, stating that his name recognition would help propel him to victory. Mann won the three-week special primary to become the Democratic nominee, narrowly defeating State Senator William Bowen. Mann won 51% of the vote in the general election, defeating both Republican-backed independent Stephen Grote and Libertarian-affiliated independent Jim Berns.

=== Tenure ===
Mann began serving in the 103rd United States Congress in 1993. While in the House, he sponsored five bills and served on the House Armed Services and House Judiciary Committees. Mann voted against President Bill Clinton's stimulus package and budget proposal and was skeptical towards Clinton's health care plan. Mann also called for further investigation into the Whitewater controversy. His opposition to much of Clinton's agenda led an article in The Washington Post to state that he "often behaves more like a Republican than a Democrat". Mann supported some Clinton-backed initiatives, such as the Brady Bill, which established a waiting period of five days for handgun purchases. Mann voted in favor of the North American Free Trade Agreement (NAFTA), which damaged his reputation with some of his allies in organized labor. Mann voted for the 1994 Crime Bill, which he later said he regretted. After learning that one of his sons was gay, he voted in favor of Barney Frank's failed 1994 bill to prohibit anti-LGBT discrimination.

=== Defeat in 1994 ===
With Mann facing labor backlash for his support of NAFTA, Bowen challenged him for the Democratic nomination in the 1994 election. Despite statements by unions that they would support primary candidates running against pro-NAFTA Democrats, NPR referred to Bowen as the only "serious" labor-backed primary challenger in the country. The Clinton administration supported Mann in the primary, with Vice President Al Gore attending two fundraisers that collectively grossed over $100,000 for Mann's campaign. The sum from Gore's fundraisers roughly matched the donations that Bowen stated he would receive from unions. In a debate against Bowen, Mann expressed his alignment with the New Democrats and refused to support increased taxes or spending, stating that Bowen wanted to "tax more and spend more". Mann won renomination by 667 votes, which an article in The Christian Science Monitor attributed to his successful television advertising. Unions were divided on Mann's general election campaign; some, such as the Ohio Education Association, endorsed him, while others, such as the Cincinnati AFL–CIO Labor Council, refused to do so. Mann ultimately lost his bid for re-election to Republican Steve Chabot in the "Republican Revolution". Mann left office in 1995.

After losing his bid for congressional re-election, Mann ran for a position on the Ohio First District Court of Appeals in 1996, but lost to incumbent Lee Hildebrandt Jr. He would not return as a candidate for office until 2013.

== Second City Council tenure (2013–22) ==
In 2013, Mann returned to office after winning election to a seat on the city council. He was simultaneously endorsed by the Democratic Party and the Charter Committee. Mann was appointed vice mayor by Mayor John Cranley in 2013, a position which he would hold until 2018. Mann opposed the Cincinnati streetcar and voted to halt its construction on his fourth day in office, but work on the project eventually proceeded. Mann often served as a mediator between Cranley and Cranley's opponents on the Council, helping broker deals on a number of issues. In 2015, Mann reached a compromise with Cranley on a budget dispute, preventing a government shutdown.

Mann was re-elected in 2017. In 2018, Mann became the chair of the Council's Budget and Finance Committee, which is responsible for the city's finances. That same year, Mann proposed levying an excise tax on short-term rentals, with the proceeds going to the city's affordable housing fund. Mann stated that the tax would "strike a balance between preserving and funding affordable housing units and community in neighborhoods, encouraging tourism and entrepreneurship through short-term rentals, and ensuring that all visitors to Cincinnati are staying in units that are safe and up to code". The proposal was implemented in 2019. In 2020, Mann voted with the majority of the Council to remove the fare from the streetcar.

== 2021 mayoral campaign ==
In May 2020, Mann announced that he would run for mayor of Cincinnati in the 2021 election. In a letter to potential donors, Mann stated that he had no ambitions for higher office beyond city politics and that his "experience and leadership qualities" could help address the effects of the COVID-19 pandemic. In May 2021, Mann won 29% of the vote in the nonpartisan mayoral primary, placing second and advancing to the general election. Following the primary, Mann stated that general election opponent Aftab Pureval lacked the experience to serve as mayor, referring to Pureval's position of Hamilton County Clerk of Courts as "small". By October 21, Mann had raised $388,307, trailing Pureval's $961,810. Mann lost the November general election with 34% of the vote to Pureval's 66%.

== Other ventures ==
Mann joined the Ohio State Bar Association in 1968. From 1995 to 2001, he taught at the University of Cincinnati College of Law. In 1997, Mann and his son Michael founded their own law firm, Mann & Mann. The firm primarily handles tax law and employment discrimination cases.

Mann has served on the boards of numerous charitable organizations, including the Make-A-Wish Foundation and the Freestore Foodbank.

== Personal life ==
Mann lives in the Clifton neighborhood of Cincinnati with his wife Betsy, whom he married in 1963. They have three children. Mann is a Methodist.

== Electoral history ==
Ohio's 1st congressional district, 1992
Party	Candidate	Votes	%
Democratic	David Mann	120,190	51.3
Independent (Note: Grote was endorsed by the Republican Party, but failed to meet the deadline to officially run as a Republican.)	Stephen Grote	101,498	43.3
Independent	Jim Berns	12,734	5.4
Total votes		234,433 (Note: Includes 11 write-in votes.)	100.0
Democratic hold			

Ohio's 1st congressional district, 1994
Party	Candidate	Votes	%
Republican	Steve Chabot	92,997	56
Democratic	David Mann (incumbent)	72,822	44
Total votes		165,819	100.0
Republican gain from Democratic			

Mayor of Cincinnati, 2021
Party	Candidate	Votes	%
Nonpartisan (Note: The mayoral race was officially nonpartisan, though both candidates were affiliated with the Democratic Party.)	Aftab Pureval	34,541	65.84
Nonpartisan	David Mann	17,919	34.16
Total votes		52,460	100.0
Democratic hold			

== See also ==
- List of United States representatives from Ohio

Political offices
Preceded by Ken Blackwell	Mayor of Cincinnati; 1980–1981	Succeeded by Thomas Brush
Preceded by Charlie Luken	Mayor of Cincinnati; 1991–1992	Succeeded by Dwight Tillery
U.S. House of Representatives
Preceded by Charlie Luken	Member of the U.S. House of Representatives from Ohio's 1st congressional district 1993–1995	Succeeded by Steve Chabot
U.S. order of precedence (ceremonial)
Preceded by Eric Fingerhut as Former U.S. Representative	Order of precedence of the United States as Former US Representative	Succeeded by John Boccieri as Former U.S. Representative
