= Jim Luken =

American politician and labor union leader

55th Mayor of Cincinnati
- In office December 1, 1976 – 1977
- Preceded by: Bobbie L. Sterne
- Succeeded by: Jerry Springer

Member of the Ohio House of Representatives from the 24th district
- In office January 1, 1973 – December 1, 1975
- Preceded by: Dale Schmidt
- Succeeded by: Terry Tranter

Personal details
- Born: December 31, 1921
- Died: July 12, 1979 (aged 57) Cincinnati, Ohio, U.S.
- Resting place: New St. Joseph Cemetery
- Party: Democratic
- Spouse: Ida Smith
- Relatives: Tom Luken (brother); Charlie Luken (nephew)

James T. Luken (December 31, 1921 – July 12, 1979) was an American politician and labor union leader of the Democratic party, who served as mayor of Cincinnati, Ohio, in the 1970s.

== Career ==
After graduating from Norwood High School, Luken started a milk delivery route in 1941. At age 26, he was elected president of the Milk and Ice Cream Drivers and Dairy Workers Local 98 and would continue to serve in that role for the rest of his life. The Milk Driver's Union was a subsidiary of the Teamsters. Luken was one of the few Teamsters who stood up to the corrupt leadership of Teamsters President Jimmy Hoffa. Luken withdrew the dairy workers from the Teamsters Union and testified against Hoffa before the United States Senate.

Luken served in the Ohio House of Representatives from January 1, 1973 until December 1, 1975, when he resigned after being elected to Cincinnati City Council. The following year he became Mayor of Cincinnati.

== Personal life ==
Luken was one of eight children in his family. His brother, Tom Luken, and his nephew, Charlie Luken, both served as U.S. representatives and mayors of Cincinnati.

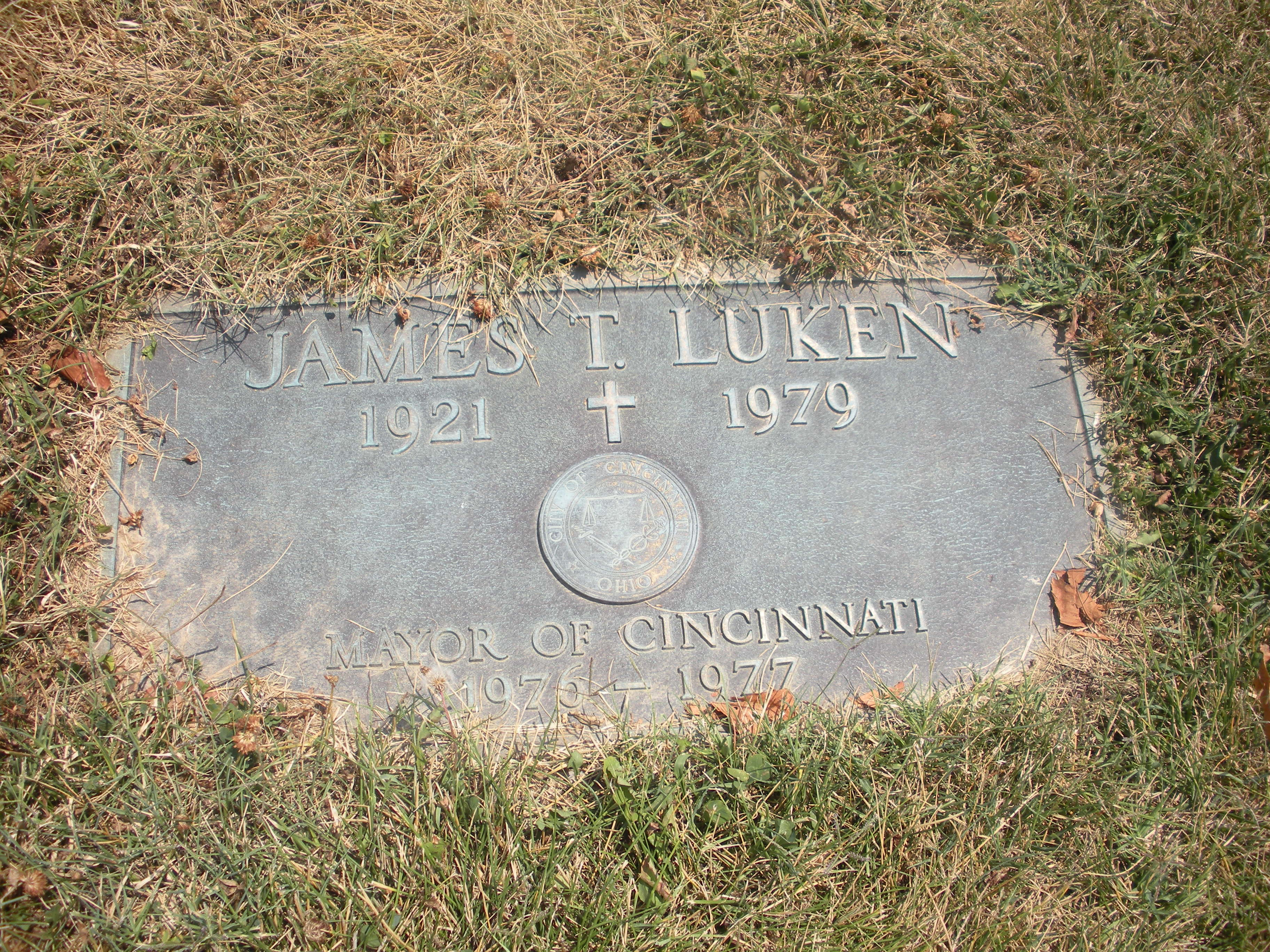
Headstone

Luken died on July 12, 1979, and is interred at New St. Joseph Cemetery.

Political offices
Preceded by Bobbie L. Sterne	Mayor of Cincinnati, Ohio; 1976–1977	Succeeded by Jerry Springer
