= 2001 Cincinnati mayoral election =

- November 6, 2001
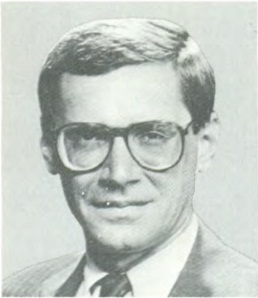

Candidate	Charlie Luken	Courtis Fuller
Party	Nonpartisan	Nonpartisan
Popular vote	47,715	38,281
Percentage	55.49%	44.51%
Mayor before election
Charlie Luken
Democratic
Elected mayor
Charlie Luken
Democratic

The 2001 Cincinnati mayoral election took place on November 6, 2001, to elect the Mayor of Cincinnati, Ohio. The election was officially nonpartisan, with the top two candidates from the primary election advancing to the general election, regardless of party. This was the first election in Cincinnati where the mayor was elected directly. Previously, the person that got the most votes in the city council elections automatically became mayor.

While the election was nonpartisan, Luken was associated with the Democratic Party and Fuller was affiliated with the Charter Party.

== General election ==
Cincinnati mayoral election, 2001
Party	Candidate	Votes	%
Nonpartisan	Charlie Luken (incumbent)	47,715	55.49
Nonpartisan	Courtis Fuller	38,281	44.51
Total votes		85,996	100.00
