= Courtis Fuller =

American news broadcaster

Courtis John Fuller (born 26 January 1957) is a news broadcaster in Cincinnati, Ohio, who is active in politics and in local community affairs. Fuller is an on-air personality at WLWT-TV. He was named "Cincinnati's Favorite TV Personality" by the Broadcast Hall of Fame.

In 2001, Fuller, a lifelong Democrat, ran as a Charterite candidate for the office of mayor of Cincinnati. The incumbent mayor was Charlie Luken, a former colleague of Fuller's in the WLWT newsroom. In the non-partisan primary election, Fuller managed a surprise first-place finish. However, in the general election, he received 45 percent of the vote to 55 percent by the incumbent Luken.

Fuller became the host of a radio talk show, returning to television news on WLWT in 2003.

He is a member of several community boards and commissions, including the Greater Cincinnati Tall Stacks Commission and the Cincinnati Symphony Orchestra Board of Trustees.

== See also ==
- Cincinnati mayoral elections
