= 2013 Cincinnati mayoral election =

- November 5, 2013
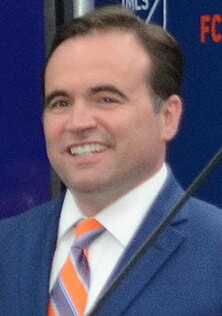

| Candidate | John Cranley | Roxanne Qualls |
| Party | Nonpartisan | Nonpartisan |
| Popular vote | 33,428 | 24,288 |
| Percentage | 57.92% | 42.08% |
Mayor before election
Mark Mallory
Democratic
Elected mayor
John Cranley
Democratic

The 2013 Cincinnati mayoral election took place on November 5, 2013, to elect the Mayor of Cincinnati, Ohio. The election was officially nonpartisan, with the top two candidates from the September 10 primary advancing to the general election, regardless of party. One of the biggest issues for this election was the proposed streetcar (now known as the Cincinnati Bell Connector) which Cranley opposed and Qualls supported.

While the election was officially nonpartisan, Cranley and Qualls were both known Democrats, while Jim Berns Sandra and Queen Noble, who were both eliminated in the primary, were known Libertarians.

== Candidates ==
- Jim Berns, Libertarian candidate in the 2010 and 2012 congressional elections
- John Cranley, former Cincinnati City Council member
- Sandra Queen Noble, Libertarian candidate in the 2012 congressional election and candidate in the 2005 mayoral election
- Roxanne Qualls, Cincinnati City Council member and former Mayor of Cincinnati

== Primary election ==
Primary election results
| Party | Candidate | Votes | % |
|---|---|---|---|
| Nonpartisan | John Cranley | 6,435 | 55.65 |
| Nonpartisan | Roxanne Qualls | 4,307 | 37.25 |
| Nonpartisan | Jim Berns | 572 | 4.95 |
| Nonpartisan | Sandra Queen Noble | 249 | 2.15 |
| Total votes | | 11,563 | 100.00 |

== General election ==
Cincinnati mayoral election, 2013
| Party | Candidate | Votes | % |
|---|---|---|---|
| Nonpartisan | John Cranley | 33,428 | 57.92 |
| Nonpartisan | Roxanne Qualls | 24,288 | 42.08 |
| Total votes | | 57,716 | 100.00 |
