= Tom Luken =

American politician

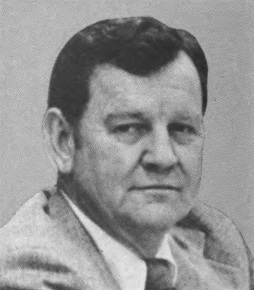

Member of the U.S. House of Representatives from Ohio
- In office March 5, 1974 – January 3, 1975
- Preceded by: William J. Keating
- Succeeded by: Bill Gradison
- Constituency: 1st district
- In office January 3, 1977 – January 3, 1991
- Preceded by: Donald D. Clancy
- Succeeded by: Charlie Luken
- Constituency: 2nd district (1977–1983); 1st district (1983–1991)

Mayor of Cincinnati
- In office 1971–1972
- Preceded by: Bill Gradison
- Succeeded by: Ted Berry

Personal details
- Born: Thomas Andrew Luken; July 9, 1925 Cincinnati, Ohio, U.S.
- Died: January 10, 2018 (aged 92) Cincinnati, Ohio, U.S.
- Party: Democratic
- Spouse: Shirley Ann Ast (1947-2018; his death)
- Children: Charlie Luken, Mary Miller, Annie Hall (deceased), Timothy Luken, Margaret Sandman, Elizabeth Luken, Martha Luken, Matthew Luken
- Relatives: Jim Luken (brother)
- Education: Bowling Green State University; Xavier University; Salmon P. Chase College of Law

Military service
- Allegiance: United States
- Branch/service: United States Marine Corps
- Battles/wars: World War II

Thomas Andrew Luken (July 9, 1925 – January 10, 2018) was an American politician of the Democratic Party from Ohio, serving in the United States House of Representatives during the 1970s and 1980s.

== Early life and education ==
Luken received his high school diploma in 1942 from Purcell High School. During the Second World War, Luken served as a U.S. Marine. In 1947, he earned a Bachelor of Arts degree from Xavier University in Cincinnati, after having earned some credits at Bowling Green State University. In 1950, he earned a law degree at the Salmon P. Chase College of Law at Northern Kentucky University and began practicing law.

== Career ==
From 1955 to 1961, Luken served as solicitor for the city of Deer Park, Ohio. He was then appointed United States District Attorney for the Southern District of Ohio, in which he served from 1961 to 1964. He served on the Cincinnati city council from 1964 to 1967 and from 1969 to 1974. He also was the mayor of Cincinnati from 1971 to 1972.

In 1974, Luken won a special election in the Cincinnati-based 1st congressional district to fill out the term of William J. Keating, a Republican who resigned his seat. However, Luken was defeated later that year in his bid for a full term by Republican Bill Gradison, who had preceded him as mayor of Cincinnati. In 1976, Luken ran in the neighboring 2nd district and unseated Republican incumbent Donald D. Clancy, beginning service in 1977 (95th Congress). He was reelected six times, all by large margins. He was only the second Democrat to represent a significant portion of Cincinnati for more than one term in the 20th century.

In 1983, Luken and Gradison swapped districts as a result of the 1980 census, with Luken's district being renumbered as the 1st District. He did not run for an eighth term in 1990, opting instead to retire in favor of his son, Cincinnati mayor Charlie Luken, who won a term in his father's former seat.

Tom Luken's brother, Jim Luken, was a labor leader and also served as a Cincinnati mayor.

== Death ==
Tom Luken died on January 10, 2018.

Political offices
Preceded by Bill Gradison	Mayor of Cincinnati, Ohio; 1971–1972	Succeeded by Ted Berry
U.S. House of Representatives
Preceded by William J. Keating	Member of the U.S. House of Representatives from Ohio's 1st congressional district 1974–1975	Succeeded by Willis D. Gradison, Jr.
Preceded by Donald D. Clancy	Member of the U.S. House of Representatives from Ohio's 2nd congressional district 1977–1983	Succeeded by Willis D. Gradison, Jr.
Preceded by Willis D. Gradison, Jr.	Member of the U.S. House of Representatives from Ohio's 1st congressional district 1983–1991	Succeeded by Charlie Luken
