= Charlie Luken =

American politician

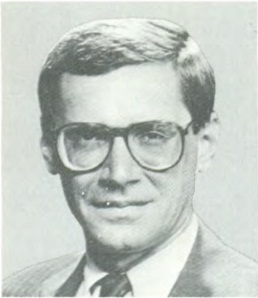

63rd and 67th Mayor of Cincinnati
- In office January 1, 1999 – December 1, 2005
- Preceded by: Roxanne Qualls
- Succeeded by: Mark Mallory
- In office January 1, 1984 – January 2, 1991
- Preceded by: Arn Bortz
- Succeeded by: David S. Mann

Member of the U.S. House of Representatives from Ohio's 1st district
- In office January 3, 1991 – January 3, 1993
- Preceded by: Tom Luken
- Succeeded by: David S. Mann

Personal details
- Born: Charles John Luken; July 18, 1951 (age 75) Cincinnati, Ohio, U.S.
- Party: Democratic
- Parent: Tom Luken (father)
- Relatives: Jim Luken (uncle)
- Education: University of Notre Dame (BA); University of Cincinnati (JD)

Charles John Luken (born July 18, 1951), usually known publicly as Charlie Luken, is an American politician of the Democratic Party who was mayor of Cincinnati, Ohio, and served in Ohio's 1st congressional district in the United States House of Representatives. When Luken left office at the end of 2005, he was the longest-serving mayor in Cincinnati's history with 12 years and one month of service in that role.

== Education ==
Luken graduated from Purcell High School in Cincinnati, then earned a Bachelor of Arts degree from the University of Notre Dame in 1973. He earned a degree at the University of Cincinnati College of Law in 1976, and began the practice of law.

== Early career ==
Rejected by the Democratic Party as a successor to his uncle, Jim Luken, Charlie Luken first ran for the Cincinnati City Council as an independent, losing the at-large race in 1979. He won election to the Council in 1981, however, and became mayor (at that time, the Council chairman) in 1984.

Luken served as mayor of Cincinnati from 1984 to 1990. In 1985 he sponsored an amendment to the city charter that made the leading vote-getter in a regular Council election the mayor. Under that system Luken was elected mayor in 1985, 1987 and 1989.

During the 1984 Democratic presidential primaries, Luken endorsed the candidacy of former vice president Walter Mondale.

In 1990, Luken's father, Tom Luken, a member of the United States House of Representatives from Ohio, decided to retire. Charlie Luken then ran to succeed his father in Ohio's District 1. He won the seat, defeating another former Cincinnati mayor, Ken Blackwell, but declined to run for re-election in 1992.

Returning from Washington, Luken worked as a news anchor at WLWT-TV from 1993 to 1999, the same Cincinnati station where ex-mayor Jerry Springer and Tom Atkins, a onetime political opponent of Luken's father, had worked as news anchors. In that role, Luken's newscasts at WLWT were awarded best newscast in Ohio on two occasions.

== Cincinnati's first "strong mayor" ==
Luken returned to politics in 1999, again taking over the office of mayor of Cincinnati. A change in the city charter made the mayoralty a separately-elected office as of 2001 and established a "strong-mayor" form of government, as well as extending the mayor's term to four years. Luken thus was the last Cincinnati mayor to chair the City Council simultaneously.

While preparing to run for election to a four-year term as a "strong mayor," Luken had to deal with the 2001 Cincinnati Riots resulting from perceived racism on the part of city police, as evidenced by a pattern of racial profiling and the shooting deaths of several unarmed black men. In the officially nonpartisan primary, Luken faced his former WLWT co-anchor Courtis Fuller (a black Democrat running with the endorsement of the Charter Party of Cincinnati). The racial discord following the riots was highlighted by a Cincinnati boycott by black celebrities and national organizations. The Hamilton County Board of Elections initially questioned the validity of Fuller's candidacy because he had moved into the city only just before entering the contest. Luken, however, discouraged the board from its inquiry, stating that it would be bad for the city if he had no opponent for re-election, as the Republican Party had failed to field a candidate in the mayor's race. In the primary, held September 11, 2001, Fuller finished first with 54% to Luken's 38%; the two advanced to the general election. The infamous terrorist attacks in New York City and Washington, D.C., which occurred the same day as the primary, overshadowed Fuller's performance against Luken.

In the general election, Luken managed to beat Fuller. Luken's margin of slightly over 10 percent turned his 18-point primary shortcoming into a 28-point reversal in just eight weeks. The voting followed racial lines, with Fuller receiving 78 percent of the vote in predominantly black voting wards, while Luken received about 80 percent of the vote in predominantly white wards, which collectively are more populous in Cincinnati; this split contributed heavily to Luken's win.

== Withdrawal from politics ==
In August 2004, Luken announced he would not seek re-election to another term as mayor. In September 2004, he briefly flirted with running for Hamilton County Prosecuting Attorney as a write-in candidate because scandal-plagued incumbent Michael K. Allen had no opponent. Luken reactivated his dormant law license but ultimately decided not to run.

The 2005 primary race for his successor featured first-term councilman David Pepper (son of John Pepper, former CEO of Procter & Gamble) and Mark Mallory, a member of the state Senate. With the previous election following the city's racial divides so closely, the race of the candidates — Pepper is white, Mallory is black — was considered significant. Both candidates were Democrats outside of local politics. Mallory was elected as Luken's successor on November 8, 2005.

== Highlights of Luken's mayoralty ==
A few days after the riots in April of 2001, Luken requested the United States Justice Department review the policies and practices of the Cincinnati Police Department. The result was the Cincinnati Collaborative Agreement, a wide ranging change in police policies and practices that has become a national model of community engagement in policing.

In 2004 Luken founded the nonprofit development corporation known as the Center City Development Corporation (3CDC), and that organization is widely credited with bringing a resurgence to Cincinnati's urban core.

Also in 2004, Luken made repeal of Article 12 (an ordinance prohibiting the city from passing any legislation advancing LGBTQ rights) a central part of the City's agenda in his State of the City speech. That November the citizens of Cincinnati repealed Article 12.

Luken has also chaired the Ohio State Racing Commission (2006-2010) and is currently the chairman of the Cincinnati Port Authority (cincinnatiport.org).

== Personal life ==
Luken, who is divorced, has three children.

== See also ==
- List of United States representatives from Ohio

Political offices
Preceded by Arn Bortz	Mayor of Cincinnati; 1984–1991	Succeeded by David S. Mann
Preceded by Roxanne Qualls	Mayor of Cincinnati; 1999–2005	Succeeded by Mark Mallory
U.S. House of Representatives
Preceded by Thomas A. Luken	Member of the U.S. House of Representatives from Ohio's 1st congressional district 1991–1993	Succeeded by David S. Mann
U.S. order of precedence (ceremonial)
Preceded by David Davis as Former U.S. Representative	Order of precedence of the United States as Former U.S. Representative	Succeeded by Eric Fingerhut as Former U.S. Representative
