= John Cranley =

American politician

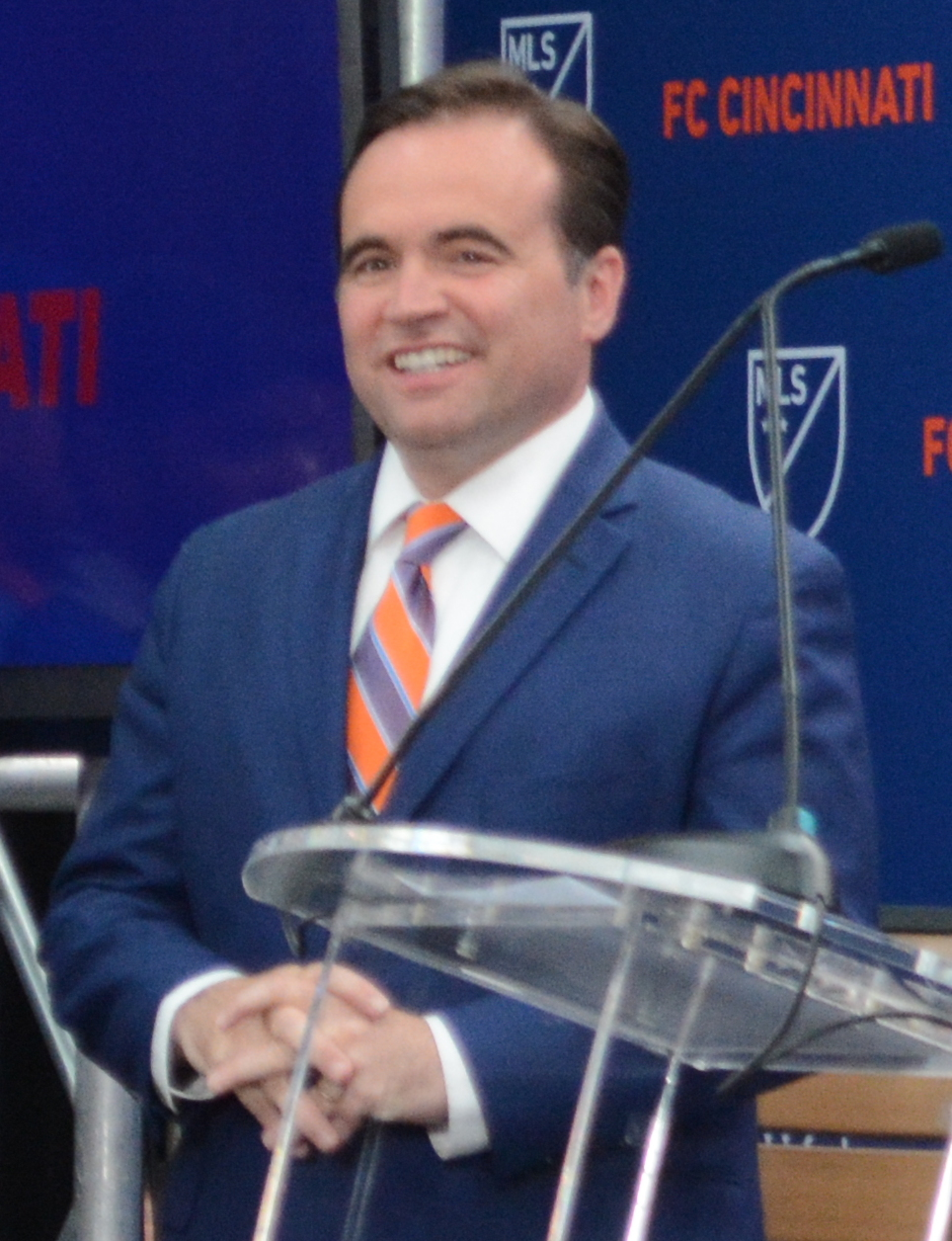
- Cranley at an FC Cincinnati event in 2018

69th Mayor of Cincinnati
- In office December 1, 2013 – January 4, 2022
- Deputy: David S. Mann (2013–18); Christopher Smitherman (2018–22)
- Preceded by: Mark Mallory
- Succeeded by: Aftab Pureval

Member of the Cincinnati City Council
- In office 2000–2009

Personal details
- Born: John Joseph Cranley; February 28, 1974 (age 52) Green Township, Ohio, U.S.
- Party: Democratic
- Spouse: Dena Cranley
- Children: 1
- Education: John Carroll University (BA); Harvard University (MTS, JD)

John Joseph Cranley (born February 28, 1974) is an American attorney and politician who served as the 69th mayor of Cincinnati from 2013 to 2022. A member of the Democratic Party, he was a member of the Cincinnati City Council from 2000 to 2009.

Cranley is a graduate of John Carroll University, Harvard Law School and Harvard Divinity School. Before his election as mayor, he was an attorney with the law firm of Keating Muething & Klekamp and co-founder of the Ohio Innocence Project at the University of Cincinnati College of Law. He was a candidate for the Democratic Party's nomination in the 2022 Ohio gubernatorial election, losing the primary to Nan Whaley.

== Background ==
Cranley was born in Green Township to John Joseph "Jay" Cranley (born 1946) and his wife, Susan (born 1947). His father is a life estate planner and Vietnam veteran who served in the United States Army, and his mother a former teacher and librarian. Cranley was raised in the Price Hill neighborhood of Cincinnati. He attended St. William's Primary School and graduated from St. Xavier High School in 1992.

Cranley graduated from John Carroll University, magna cum laude in philosophy and political science, and served twice as student body president. He earned his Juris Doctor from Harvard Law School and a Master of Theological Studies from the Harvard Divinity School. He taught two undergraduate legal and philosophy courses at Harvard College while attending graduate school. During his second and third years at Harvard Law School, he worked as a student attorney for people who could not afford legal counsel. In his third year of law school, he was elected First Class Marshal and delivered the Harvard Law School graduation speech on behalf of his class. In 2019 and again in 2021, Cranley was voted reader pick for "Best Conservative" in Cincinnati CityBeat's annual Best of Cincinnati.

== Cincinnati City Council ==
Cranley served on city council from 2000 to 2009. In 2003, he led the push to create Tax Increment Finance districts in Cincinnati. Cranley served on the following committees: Arts, Culture, Tourism & Marketing; Economic Development; Law and Public Safety; and the Transportation & Infrastructure sub-committee. Cranley resigned from City Council in 2009 in order to avoid any potential conflicts after seeking advice from the Ohio Ethics Commission.

=== Incline District development ===
Cranley worked to restore the historic Incline District of East Price Hill. He developed a $5 million project which consists of condominiums and a restaurant.

=== Ohio Innocence Project ===
In 2002, Cranley co-founded the Ohio Innocence Project at the University of Cincinnati College of Law and served as administrative director from 2002 to 2006. As of March 2019, the Project had exonerated 28 wrongly convicted individuals. Cranley's argument before Ohio's 5th Appellate District Court led to the 2006 reversal of Christopher Lee Bennett's conviction of aggravated vehicular homicide. Bennett had served four years of a nine-year sentence before the Project was able to use DNA to help overturn his conviction.

== Political campaigns ==
In 2000 and 2006, Cranley lost in Ohio's 1st congressional district race to incumbent Steve Chabot, with 45% of the vote in 2000, and 48% of the vote in 2006.

Cranley won the September 2013 primary election for mayor of Cincinnati, defeating Roxanne Qualls in the November 2013 mayoral election. He was sworn in on December 1, 2013.

Cranley ran for reelection in the 2017 Cincinnati mayoral election. His leading opponent was Yvette Simpson according to a poll sponsored by Simpson. Following a close mayoral race Cranley won reelection as Mayor of the City of Cincinnati for a second term ending in December 2021. Cranley was term limited to two terms.

Because Cranley was term limited as mayor, he was mentioned as a possible Democratic candidate for governor of Ohio in 2022. In February 2020, Cranley became the first candidate to announce and explore a possible run for governor in 2022 against Republican incumbent Mike DeWine. He officially entered the race for the 2022 Democratic nomination for governor on August 10, 2021.

In his campaign, he criticized the Ohio Republican Party for rigging elections through gerrymandering and for corrupt legislation like HB6, which led to the Ohio nuclear bribery scandal.

== Additional service ==
Mayor Cranley previously served on the boards of the Freestore Foodbank, Mercy Hospital Foundation, and the Jesuit Spiritual Center. Cranley was named a 2014 Aspen Institute Rodel Fellow.

Political offices
Preceded by Mark Mallory	Mayor of Cincinnati; 2013–2022	Succeeded by Aftab Pureval
