= List of people from Gallipolis, Ohio =

This is a list of people who were born in, lived in, or are closely associated with the city of Gallipolis, Ohio.

== Athletics ==
- Emma Gatewood, known as Grandma Gatewood, long-distance hiker, first woman to through-hike the Appalachian Trail
- Karl George, former NFL guard
- Jerry Lucas, basketball player
- Dave Roberts, former Major League Baseball pitcher

== Arts and entertainment ==
- Skip Battin, musician and former member of the Byrds, the New Riders of the Purple Sage, and the Flying Burrito Brothers
- Lionel Cartwright, country music singer
- Madeleine Vinton Dahlgren, writer born in Gallipolis
- Alice S. Deletombe, published poet
- Jenny Holzer, public artist
- Loretta Cessor Manggrum, composer
- O. O. McIntyre, syndicated columnist
- Minnie E. Neal (1858–1945), photographer and temperance leader

== Education, politics and service ==
- James B. Aleshire, U.S. Army major general
- Jean-Joseph de Barth, leader of the "French 500" and as such one of the municipality's founders.
- Richard H. Cain, minister, abolitionist and U.S. Representative of South Carolina
- Frank Cremeans, former U.S. Congressman
- Olivia A. Davidson, a future teacher and vice-principal at Tuskegee Institute, attended school here.
- Brereton Jones, former Governor of Kentucky
- Geoffrey D. Miller, retired U.S. Major General
- William H. Nash (1834–1902), US Army brigadier general
- Nathaniel C. Sears (1854–1934), judge of the Illinois Appellate Court and Cook County Superior Court; 1897 Republican nominee for mayor of Chicago
- Ryan Smith, former Speaker, Ohio House of Representatives
- Marian Spencer, civil rights activist and former Vice-Mayor, Cincinnati,
- Robert M. Switzer, former U.S. Congressman
- Samuel Finley Vinton, former U.S. Congressman and Secretary of the Interior
- Nancy L. Zimpher, former president, University of Cincinnati, chancellor of the State University of New York (SUNY)

== Other ==
- Bob Evans, Bob Evans Restaurants founder, bought a small diner in Gallipolis in 1948
