= Tom Spencer (baseball) =

American baseball player (born 1951)

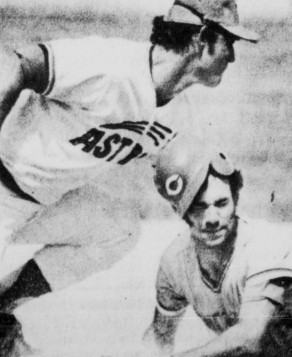
- Spencer (right) sliding into third base safely in 1975
- Outfielder
- Born: February 28, 1951 (age 75); Gallipolis, Ohio, U.S.
- Batted: Right Threw: Right

MLB debut
- July 17, 1978, for the Chicago White Sox

Last MLB appearance
- August 26, 1978, for the Chicago White Sox

MLB statistics
- Batting average: .185
- Runs: 3
- Hits: 12
- Stats at Baseball Reference

Teams
- Chicago White Sox (1978)

Hubert Thomas Spencer (born February 28, 1951) is an American former Major League Baseball outfielder. He played during one season at the major league level for the Chicago White Sox. After his playing career, he began a career managing in the minor leagues. He managed three teams to their league championships: the Asheville Tourists (1984), Geneva Cubs (1987), and Charlotte Knights (1997).

== Early life ==
Spencer was born in Gallipolis, Ohio and graduated from Gallia Academy High School. He played college baseball at the University of Rio Grande.

== Coaching and managing ==
Spencer was the first base coach for the Cleveland Indians in 1998 and 1989. In 2003, Spencer was named the manager of the Memphis Redbirds, the Triple-A affiliate of the St. Louis Cardinals. However, he was replaced as skipper by Danny Sheaffer in the middle of the 2003 season. It was announced on December 9, 2010 that Spencer was named as the manager of the Lancaster JetHawks, the Advanced Class A affiliate of the Houston Astros, for the 2011 season.
