= William H. Nash =

US Army brigadier general

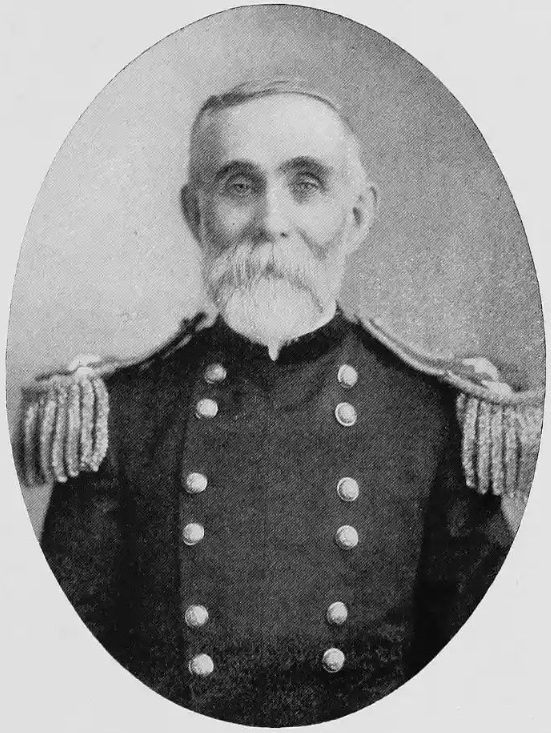
- From 1903's A History of Scioto County, Ohio
- Born: 22 June 1834; Gallipolis, Ohio
- Died: 2 December 1902 (aged 68); Columbus, Ohio, US
- Burial place: Pine Street Cemetery, Gallipolis, Ohio, US
- Alma mater: Marietta College (attended)
- Spouse(s): Sarah S. Forsythe (m. 1857–1891) Mary Maxon Wilson (m. 1892–1902)
- Children: 1
- Military career
- Allegiance: Union (American Civil War); United States
- Service: Union Army; United States Army
- Service years: 1862–1865 (Union Army); 1865–1898 (US Army)
- Rank: Brigadier General
- Unit: United States Army Subsistence Department
- Commands: Chief Commissary, Department of Texas; Chief Commissary, Department of the Missouri; Chief Commissary, District of New Mexico; Chief Commissary, Department of the Ohio; Chief Commissary, Department of the Columbia; U.S. Army Commissary General of Subsistence
- Wars: American Civil War; American Indian Wars; Spanish–American War

William H. Nash (22 June 1834 – 2 December 1902) was a career officer in the United States Army. A Union Army veteran of the American Civil War, he served from 1862 to 1898 and attained the rank of brigadier general. Nash specialized in providing food for the army's soldiers and animals, and his career culminated with appointment as its Commissary General of Subsistence.

A native of Gallipolis, Ohio, Nash was raised and educated in Gallipolis and graduated from Gallia Academy. He attended Marietta College from 1850 to 1852, then began a business career. After several years working in a Cincinnati bookstore, he started his own store in Gallipolis, which he developed into a successful wholesale and retail enterprise. He later sold his business, and he taught school in the Empire Furnace area of Powellsville, Ohio from 1860 to 1861.

In June 1861, Nash became manager of the federal government's telegraph office in Parkersburg, Virginia (now West Virginia), which included duty as a confidential telegraph operator for George B. McClellan, commander of the Department of the Ohio. In November 1862, he joined the joined the Union Army and was commissioned as a captain of United States Volunteers. Posted to the subsistence department, his assignments included the Army of the Cumberland during the Chickamauga campaign, after which he was again posted to West Virginia.

Following his wartime service, Nash was commissioned as a captain of subsistence in the regular army. He held this rank until 1890, and served in Texas, New Mexico, Ohio, Nebraska, Louisiana, Wyoming, Massachusetts, Washington state, and Missouri. He was promoted to major in 1890 and lieutenant colonel in 1896. In February 1898, Nash was promoted to colonel and appointed as the army's assistant commissary general. He was promoted to brigadier general on 21 April 1898 and assigned as the army's commissary general. With the Spanish–American War having commenced on the same day, Nash anticipated serving during the conflict even though he was scheduled for mandatory retirement upon reaching age 64 in June. However, declining health caused him to instead request retirement for disability, which was approved on 2 May.

In retirement, Nash was a resident of Columbus, Ohio. He died in Columbus on 2 December 1902. Nash was buried at Pine Street Cemetery in Gallipolis.

== Early life ==
William H. Nash (Note: Nash's middle name is given in various sources as Hoit, Hoyt, Hutt, Hart, and Holt.) was born in Gallipolis, Ohio on 22 June 1834, a son of attorney, legislator, and judge Simeon Nash and Cynthia (Smith) Nash. He was raised and educated in Gallipolis, and was a graduate of Gallia Academy. He studied at Marietta College from 1850 to 1852, then moved to Cincinnati to begin a career in business.

Nash worked at a Cincinnati bookstore from 1853 to 1856, then returned to Gallipolis to open a store of his own. He developed his enterprise into a successful wholesaler and retailer and sold it in 1859. He then taught school in Empire Furnace near Powellsville, Ohio from 1859 to 1861.

=== Family ===
In January 1857, Nash married Sarah S. Forsythe. They were the parents of a daughter, Catherine. Sarah Nash died in 1891, and in 1892 Nash married Mary (Maxon) Wilson, the widow of Theodore Wilson of Gallipolis.

== Start of career ==
In June 1861, Nash became manager of the U.S. government's telegraph office in Parkersburg, Virginia (now West Virginia), which also included duty as a confidential telegraph operator for George B. McClellan, commander of the Department of the Ohio. In November 1862, Nash joined the Union Army and was commissioned as a captain of United States Volunteers. Appointed to the subsistence department, he served with the Army of the Cumberland during the 1863 Chickamauga campaign in Georgia and Tennessee. He served with the Department of West Virginia during the Valley campaigns of 1864, including the Lynchburg campaign of May and June.

Nash received brevet promotions to major (United States Volunteers 31 March 1865, regular army 17 November 1865) to recognize his wartime accomplishments. After the end of the Civil War in 1865, Nash was commissioned as a captain of subsistence in the regular army. Assigned as chief commissary of the Department of Texas, he served in this position from March 1866 to March 1868. In Nash became the proprietor of the Gallipolis Journal newspaper, which he continued to own even as his army duties required travel and postings throughout the country.

From 1867 to 1869, Nash served in the office of the army's commissary general, and from 1869 to 1870 he performed commissary duties in Cincinnati. From 1870 to 1881, his duty stations included commissary and purchasing commissary positions at army posts in New Mexico, Nebraska, Kentucky, Wyoming, and Massachusetts. In 1870, he was assigned as chief commissary for the Department of the Missouri. From 1871 to 1873, he was chief commissary of the Department of New Mexico. While serving in Louisville, Kentucky in 1874, Nash was court-martialed on charges of attempting to rig bids for government contracts and receive kickbacks, non-payment of rent, and public drunkenness. He was acquitted of most charges but was convicted of conduct becoming an officer for having been intoxicated in public. He was sentenced to dismissal from the army, but the sentence was later commuted to suspension from duty for a year, forfeiture of pay (excepting $100 per month), (Note: Based on rank and time in service, Nash's monthly pay in 1874 would have been about $200.) and confinement to the limits of Gallia, Scioto, and Lawrence counties in Ohio.

== Continued career ==
After his suspension was over, Nash returned to duty in November 1875, and his first assignment was to inspect recently purchased food and supplies stored at Columbus Barracks, Ohio. While serving in Cheyenne, Wyoming in early 1876, Nash was the commissary of subsistence for the forces led by George Crook when they took part in the Big Horn Expedition as part of the American Indian Wars. In 1877, his duties included planning and awarding contracts for rail and wagon routes used to deliver good and supplies to American Indian reservations in Utah, Colorado, Idaho, and Wyoming.

Nash performed commissary of subsistence duties in Washington, D.C. from 1882 to 1883, after which he was assigned as chief commissary for the Department of the Ohio in Cincinnati. From 1883 to 1884, he performed commissary of subsistence duties in Baltimore. From 1885 to 1888, he was posted to New Orleans. He served at Fort Monroe, Virginia from 1889 to 1890. In January 1890, he was assigned to Vancouver Barracks and assigned as chief commissary of the Department of the Columbia, and in July he was promoted to major. He remained at Vancouver Barracks until April 1897, and was promoted to lieutenant colonel in June 1896. In May 1897, he was assigned to St. Louis. In February 1898, Nash was assigned as the army's assistant commissary general and promoted to colonel.

On 21 April 1898, Nash was promoted to brigadier general and appointed to succeed Samuel T. Cushing as the army's Commissary General of Subsistence. Several officers who had been close to retirement age had rotated through the position and served for short durations beginning in 1897, which enabled them to be promoted to brigadier general before leaving the army at age 64. Nash's retirement was planned for June 1898, but the commencement of the Spanish–American War on the day of his promotion caused him to plan for service during the conflict. However, his declining health caused him to reconsider, and he requested retirement in May. His application was approved and left the army a few weeks before turning 64.

In retirement, Nash resided in Columbus, Ohio. He died in Columbus on 2 December 1902. Nash was buried at Pine Street Cemetery in Gallipolis.

== Dates of rank ==
Nash's dates of rank were:

- Captain (United States Volunteers), 25 November 1862
- Major (United States Volunteers) (Brevet), 31 March 1865
- Captain (Regular Army), 17 November 1865
- Major (Regular Army) (Brevet), 17 November 1865
- Major (Regular Army), 14 July 1890
- Lieutenant Colonel (Regular Army), 10 June 1896
- Colonel (Regular Army), 4 February 1898
- Brigadier General (Regular Army), 21 April 1898
- Brigadier General (Retired), 2 May 1898
