= Donald Spencer =

Donald Spencer may refer to:

- Donald C. Spencer (1912–2001), American mathematician
- Donald Andrew Spencer Sr. (1915–2010), African American realtor in Cincinnati
- Don Spencer (born 1937), Australian children's television presenter and musician
