= Powellville =

Powellville or Powellsville may refer to:

- Powellville, California, former name of Blocksburg, California
- Powellville, Maryland
- Powellville, Missouri
- Powellsville, North Carolina
- Powellsville, Ohio
