= Rio Grande, Ohio =

- Village
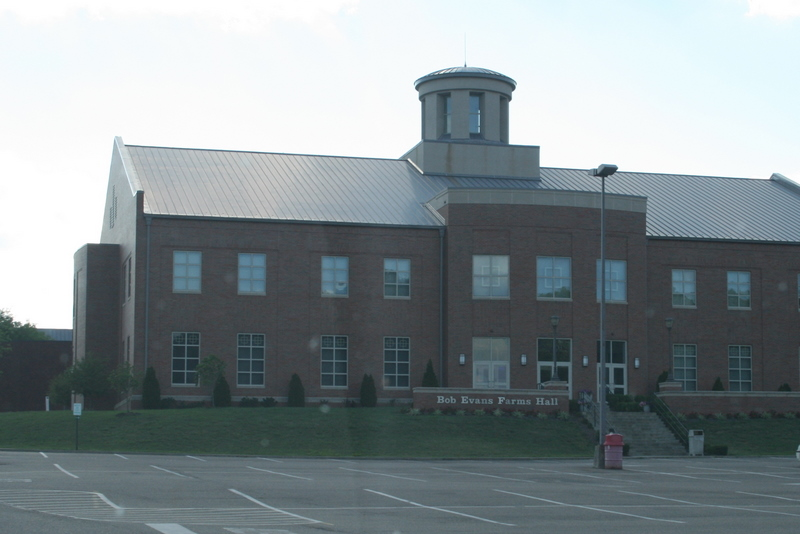
- Bob Evans Farm Hall on the university campus

- Flag

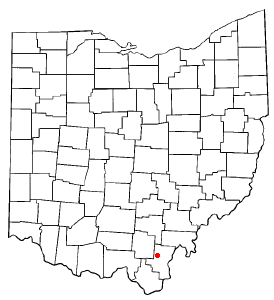
- Location of Rio Grande, Ohio

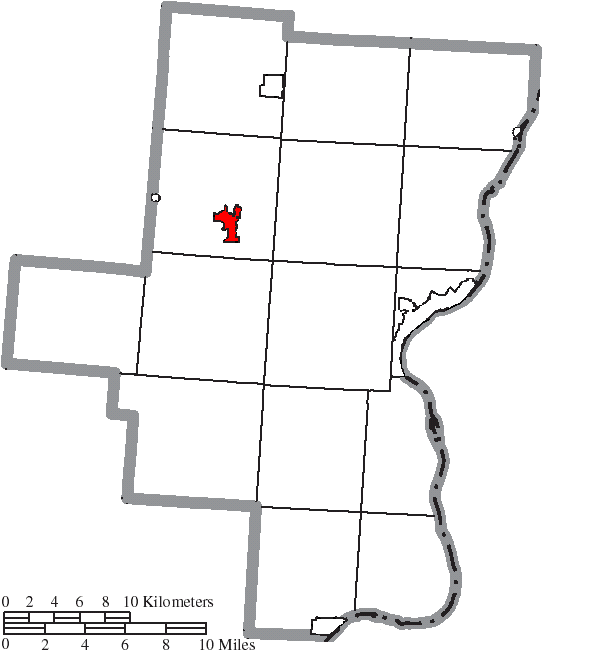
- Location of Rio Grande in Gallia County
- Coordinates: 38°52′47″N 82°22′40″W
- Country: United States
- State: Ohio
- County: Gallia
- Township: Raccoon

Area
  - Total: 1.39 sq mi (3.59 km^{2})
  - Land: 1.37 sq mi (3.56 km^{2})
  - Water: 0.012 sq mi (0.03 km^{2})
- Elevation: 650 ft (200 m)

Population (2020)
  - Total: 724
  - Density: 526.6/sq mi (203.31/km^{2})
- Time zone: UTC-5 (Eastern (EST))
  - Summer (DST): UTC-4 (EDT)
- ZIP code: 45674
- Area code: 740
- FIPS code: 39-67258
- GNIS feature ID: 2399078
- Website: https://www.rgvillage.com/

Rio Grande (/ˌraɪoʊ ˈɡrænd/ RY-oh GRAND) is a village in Gallia County, Ohio, United States. The population was 724 at the 2020 census. It is part of the rural Point Pleasant micropolitan area. Although the town is named after the river in the southern United States, its name is pronounced "Rye-O Grand" rather than the traditional Spanish pronunciation.

Rio Grande is home to the University of Rio Grande/Rio Grande Community College It is also the original location of Bob Evans Restaurants. The restaurant chain began as a single truck stop diner in Rio Grande.

== History ==
Rio Grande was established on July 6, 1874. The name of Rio Grande was chosen to commemorate the Mexican–American War.

Despite Gallia County being named for its original French settlers, Welsh immigrants began to arrive to the area in 1818, and during the 1830s and 1840s, more than 3,000 more arrived from the parishes of Pennant, Tregaron, Llangeitho, Trefilan, Llangwyryfon, and Llanddeiniolen in Ceredigion (then known as Cardiganshire). The original settlers are referred to as the "1818 Welsh" and were responsible for writing home and convincing others to come to Gallia and Jackson counties. Rio Grande's Welsh heritage is reflected in their village flag, which is identical to the Flag of Wales, with the name and establishment year included.

== Geography ==
According to the United States Census Bureau, the village has a total area of 1.37 square miles (3.55 km^{2}), of which 1.36 square miles (3.52 km^{2}) is land and 0.01 square miles (0.03 km^{2}) is water.

Rio Grande is located very close to Raccoon Creek, a tributary of the Ohio River.

== Demographics ==
Historical population
| Census | Pop. | Note | %± |
|---|---|---|---|
| 1940 | 204 | | — |
| 1950 | 388 | | 90.2% |
| 1960 | 333 | | −14.2% |
| 1970 | 814 | | 144.4% |
| 1980 | 864 | | 6.1% |
| 1990 | 995 | | 15.2% |
| 2000 | 915 | | −8.0% |
| 2010 | 830 | | −9.3% |
| 2020 | 724 | | −12.8% |
U.S. Decennial Census

=== 2010 census ===
As of the census of 2010, there were 830 people, 223 households, and 142 families residing in the village. The population density was 610.3 inhabitants per square mile (235.6/km^{2}). There were 292 housing units at an average density of 214.7 per square mile (82.9/km^{2}). The racial makeup of the village was 87.2% White, 8.8% African American, 0.2% Native American, 0.6% Asian, 0.7% from other races, and 2.4% from two or more races. Hispanic or Latino of any race were 1.3% of the population.

There were 223 households, of which 38.1% had children under the age of 18 living with them, 39.0% were married couples living together, 18.4% had a female householder with no husband present, 6.3% had a male householder with no wife present, and 36.3% were non-families. 27.8% of all households were made up of individuals, and 9.4% had someone living alone who was 65 years of age or older. The average household size was 2.35 and the average family size was 2.80.

The median age in the village was 21.9 years. 16% of residents were under the age of 18; 47% were between the ages of 18 and 24; 17% were from 25 to 44; 12.6% were from 45 to 64; and 7.3% were 65 years of age or older. The gender makeup of the village was 50.4% male and 49.6% female.

=== 2000 census ===
As of the census of 2000, there were 915 people, 232 households, and 145 families residing in the village. The population density was 764.1 inhabitants per square mile (295.0/km^{2}). There were 277 housing units at an average density of 231.3 per square mile (89.3/km^{2}). The racial makeup of the village was 90.82% White, 4.04% African American, 1.09% Native American, 2.08% Asian, 0.22% from other races, and 1.75% from two or more races. Hispanic or Latino of any race were 0.87% of the population.

There were 232 households, out of which 35.8% had children under the age of 18 living with them, 35.8% were married couples living together, 22.0% had a female householder with no husband present, and 37.5% were non-families. 26.7% of all households were made up of individuals, and 6.0% had someone living alone who was 65 years of age or older. The average household size was 2.31 and the average family size was 2.82.

In the village, the population was spread out, with 15.8% under the age of 18, 53.3% from 18 to 24, 15.6% from 25 to 44, 10.8% from 45 to 64, and 4.4% who were 65 years of age or older. The median age was 21 years. For every 100 females there were 97.6 males. For every 100 females age 18 and over, there were 97.4 males.

The median income for a household in the village was $16,932, and the median income for a family was $29,167. Males had a median income of $25,139 versus $24,583 for females. The per capita income for the village was $10,822. About 32.6% of families and 35.9% of the population were below the poverty line, including 40.9% of those under age 18 and none of those age 65 or over.

== Economy ==
The first Bob Evans restaurant was located in Rio Grande. The Bob Evans Farm is also located in Rio Grande. The original restaurant was replaced in the early 21st century by a new building. The farm has become a tourist attraction, featuring a picturesque windmill in a vast field, tours, and the annual Bob Evans Farm Festival. This event, held on an October weekend, attracts several thousand visitors.

== Education ==
Public education in the village of Rio Grande is provided by the Gallipolis City School District. Campuses serving the village include Rio Grande Elementary School, Gallia Academy Middle School, and Gallia Academy High School.

The University of Rio Grande is a private not-for-profit center of tertiary education.
