= Marian Spencer =

American politician (1920–2019)

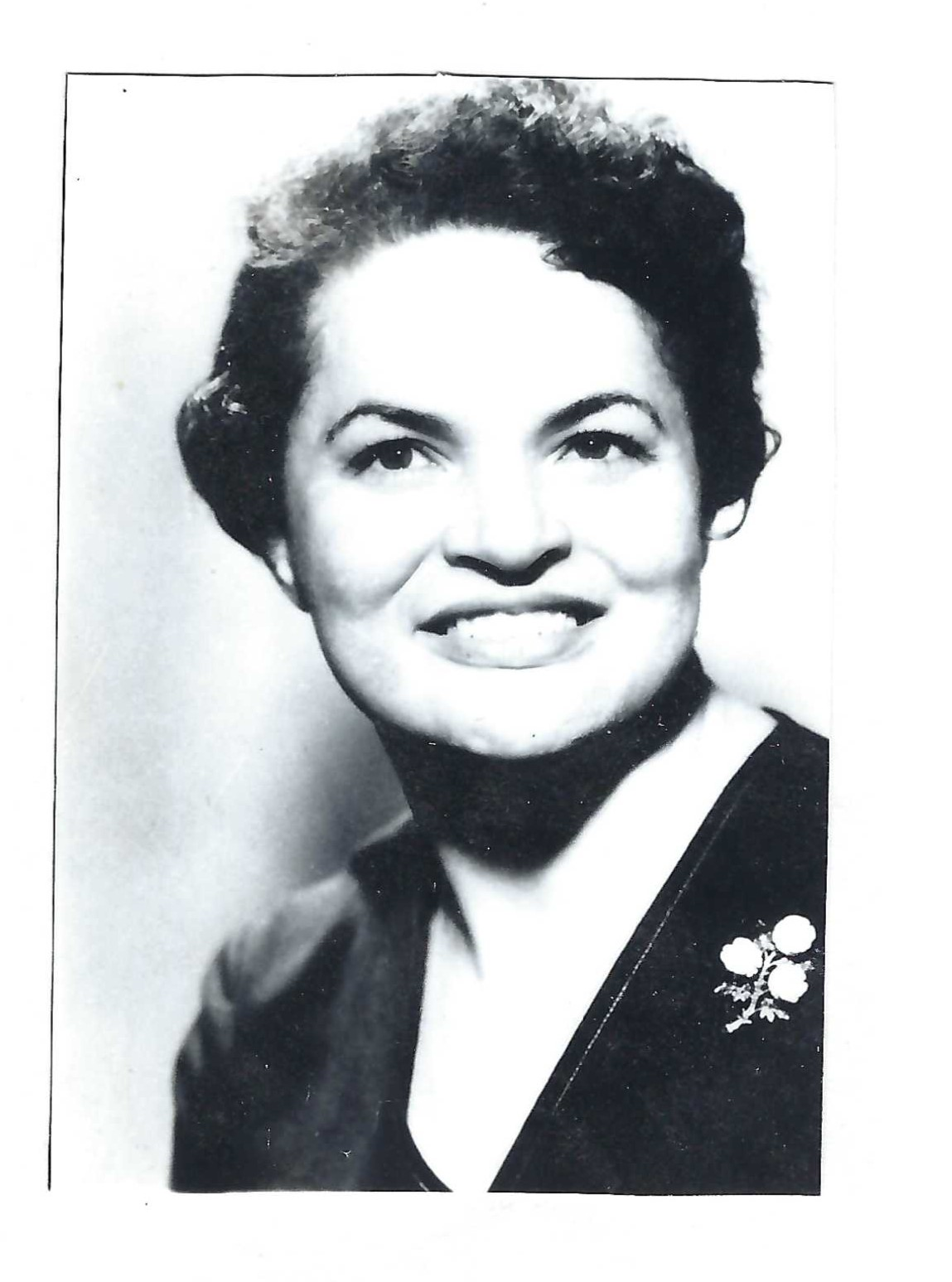
- Marian Spencer in 1968
- Born: Marian Regelia Alexander; June 28, 1920; Gallipolis, Ohio, U.S.
- Died: July 9, 2019 (aged 99)
- Education: University of Cincinnati
- Occupation: Politician
- Spouse: Donald Andrew Spencer Sr.
- Children: 2

Marian Regelia Alexander Spencer (June 28, 1920 – July 9, 2019) was an American politician who served as Vice Mayor of the Cincinnati City Council in Cincinnati, Ohio. She was the first African American woman to be elected to the Council. The granddaughter of a former slave, she was active in the civil rights movement to desegregate schools and end discrimination, and became the first female president of the Cincinnati NAACP chapter. She also served on the University of Cincinnati board of trustees.

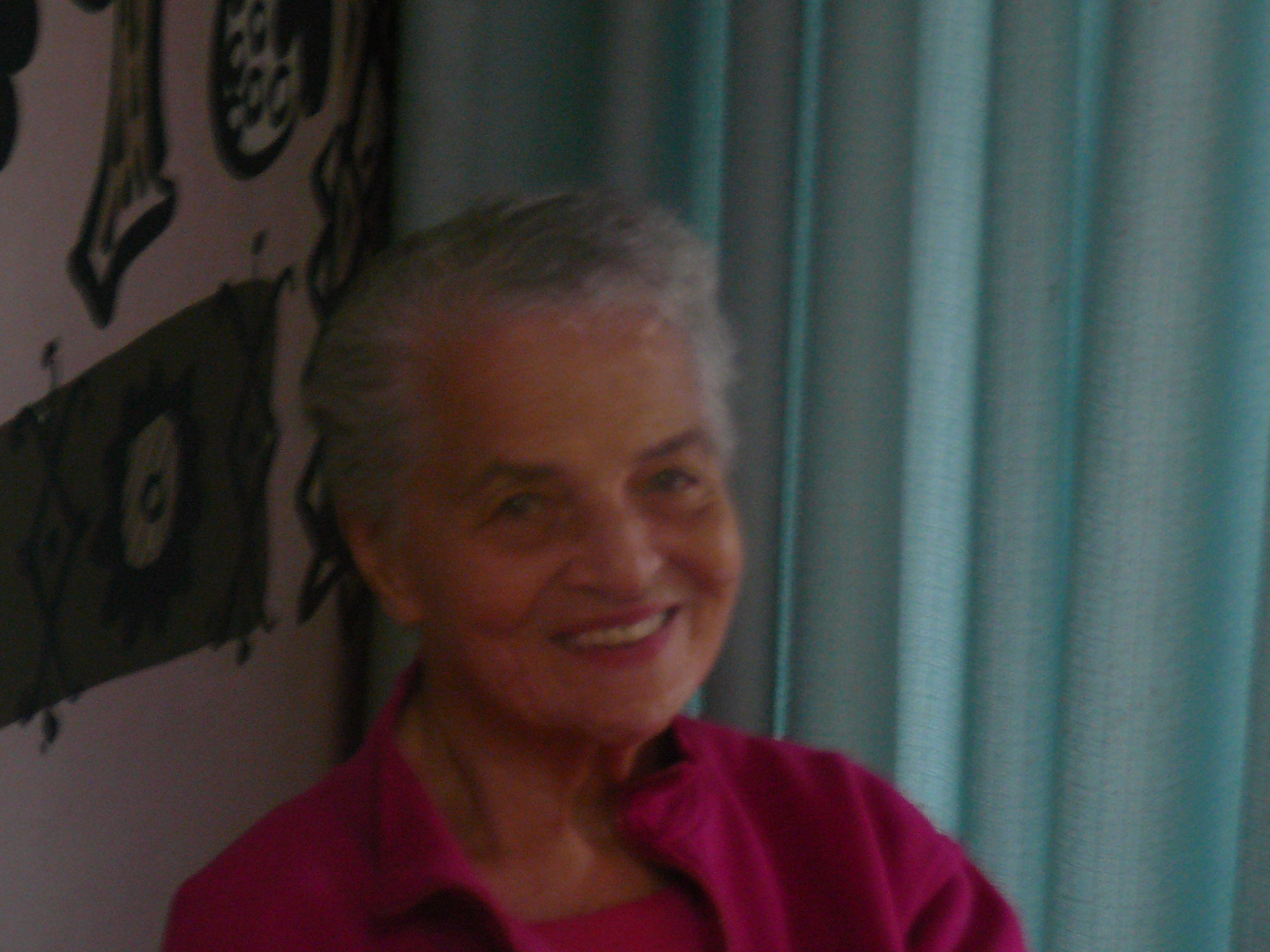
Marian Spencer in 2013

== Personal life ==
Spencer was born Marian Regelia Alexander on June 28, 1920, in Gallipolis, Ohio. Her family, including her parents, her twin sister, Mildred, and two brothers, Harry and Vernon, lived in a home that had been built by her grandfather, a freed slave.

Spencer became a member of the NAACP at age 13. She graduated from Gallia Academy High School in 1938 as co-valedictorian with her sister. She was a member of the National Honor Society. She moved to Cincinnati to attend the University of Cincinnati as a scholarship student with her sister and fellow scholarship student, Mildred Malcolm.

While at the University of Cincinnati, Spencer campaigned for the college prom to be open to all students. Spencer earned a Bachelor of Arts in English from the University of Cincinnati in 1942.

== Coney Island lawsuit ==
In 1952, Spencer's sons, after hearing a radio advertisement of a celebrity visit to the area theme park Coney Island that invited children to attend, asked to attend the event. Spencer phoned to check and was told the invitation was for all children, but when she said, "We are Negroes," was told that Blacks were not allowed into the park. She was refused entry into the park on July 4, 1952. Spencer filed a suit with the NAACP and won the case, which desegregated the park.

== Career ==
Spencer spent her entire life as a community servant and civil rights activist, working especially hard to desegregate public schools. Spencer was an activist for seven decades. She became a life member of the NAACP, and served on the Executive Board, as chairman of both the Legal Redress and Education committees. In 1981 Spencer became the first female president of the Cincinnati branch of the NAACP. She remains the only female president in the history of the Cincinnati branch of the NAACP. Spencer also served as chairperson of the Community Steering Committee for Indigent Defense, as chairperson of the Ohio Civil Rights Commission, and as the first African American elected president of the Woman's City Club. She served as president of The Links, Incorporated, and was an active member of the Board of Trustees of the Planned Parenthood of Cincinnati in the 1990s and subsequently served on the Planned Parenthood Foundation Board. Spencer also served as a member of the University of Cincinnati's Board of Trustees.

In 1983, Spencer became the first African American female elected to Cincinnati City Council, and served a single term on the council as a Charter Party member. During her term, she served as the city's Vice Mayor. While on the council, she endorsed the presidential candidacy of former vice president Walter Mondale in the 1984 Democratic presidential primaries, and served as a delegate 1984 Democratic National Convention. Spencer was four years later a delegate to the 1988 Democratic National Convention, having supported Jesse Jackson's presidential candidacy.

Spencer's career included numerous achievements and many awards and honors for her contributions to human service organizations and civic volunteer work. Among her awards are: Cincinnati Enquirer Woman of the Year Award; Brotherhood Award, National Conference of Christians and Jews; YWCA Career Woman of Achievement Award; and Humanitarian Award, Freedom Heritage Foundation of Columbus, Ohio. In 1998 Spencer was named a "Great Living Cincinnatian" by the Cincinnati USA Regional Chamber. Her husband was awarded this honor in 2005. He was the first person to receive this award to have been married to a previous recipient. In 2006 she received an Honorary Doctorate of Humane Letters from the University of Cincinnati. In 2010 the Cincinnati Public Schools renamed an elementary school in Walnut Hills, Cincinnati the Donald A. and Marian Spencer Education Center. In 2016 the Cincinnati City Council voted to rename the 100 block of Walnut Street between Theodore Berry Way and Second Street at The Banks "Marian Spencer Way." In 2018 the University of Cincinnati named a new residence hall on its main campus "Marian Spencer Hall."

On June 27, 2021 a statue of Spencer was unveiled in the Women's Garden in the southeast corner of Smale Riverfront Park in Cincinnati. It is the first statue of a named woman in Cincinnati. The statue was created by sculptors Tom Tsuchiya and Gina Erardi. The statue was commissioned by the Woman's City Club of Greater Cincinnati."

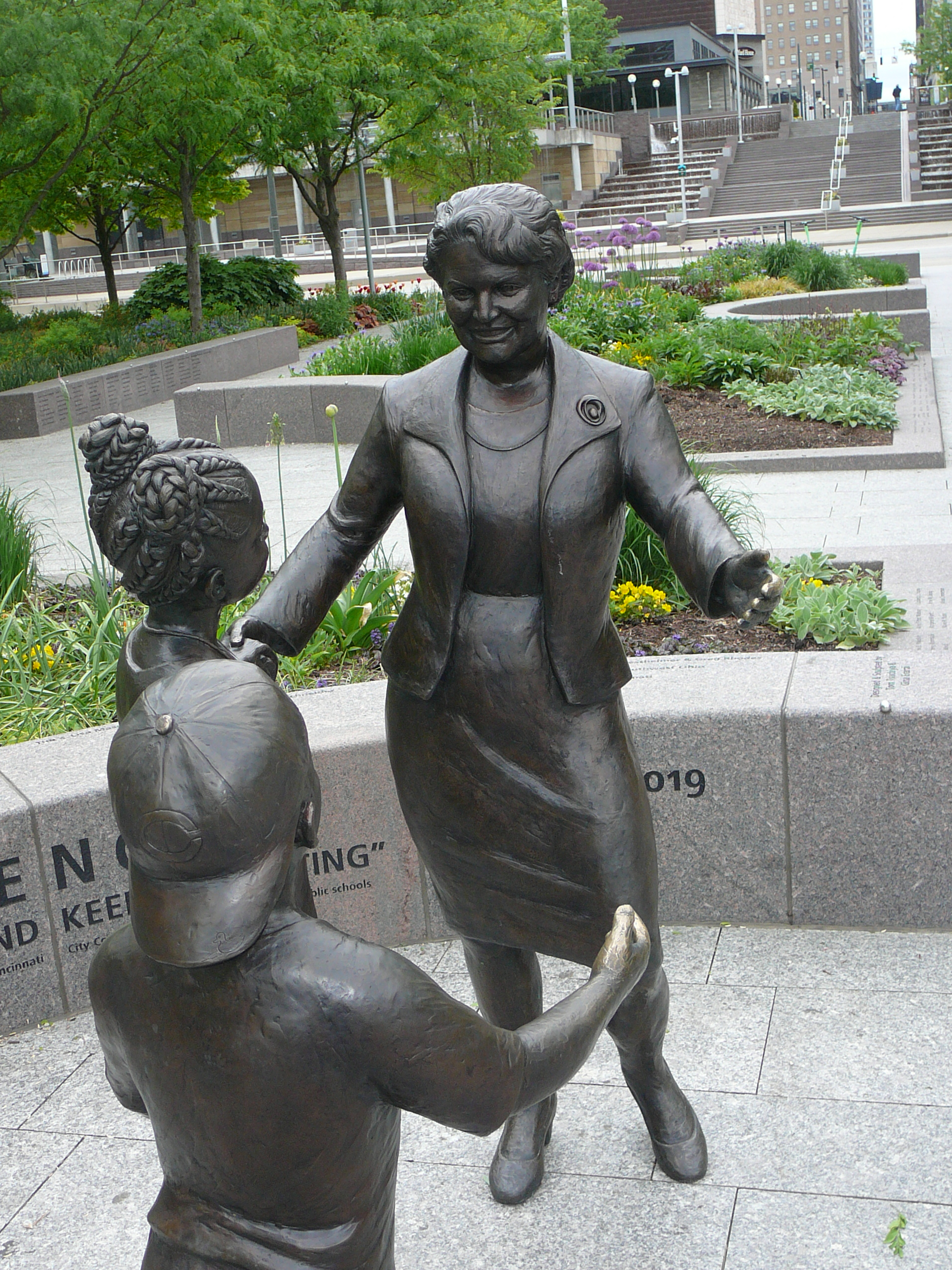
Statue of Marian Spencer in the Women's Garden at Smale Riverfront Park in downtown Cincinnati, Ohio

Marian Spencer described herself as a fighter. "All people should be equal," she said. "There should be equality, above everything. Given equal opportunity, we all arrive at the same place." Spencer successfully integrated Coney Island and the YWCA. She was recently named a Lifetime Achiever by Applause! magazine and co-chaired the YWCA's $3.8-million fund-raising campaign in Cincinnati. "Without difficulties that people met and overcome, we are less strong," Spencer said. "We've had our share."

== Other legal challenges ==
In 2004 Marian Spencer and her husband Donald Spencer, initiated litigation seeking to restrain Defendants J. Kenneth Blackwell, in his official capacity as the Secretary of State of Ohio, Intervenor Defendant State of Ohio, the Hamilton County Board of Elections and its Chair Timothy Burke and members Michael Barrett, Todd Ward, Daniel Radford and Director John Williams in their official capacities from discriminating against black voters in Hamilton County, Ohio on the basis of race. The Spencers sought to restrain the Defendants from allowing challengers at the polls in Hamilton County.

Marian and Donald Spencer resided in Avondale, Cincinnati, a predominantly African-American neighborhood. The Spencers were legally registered African American voters who voted in ward 13, precinct H. Marian Spencer estimated that one hundred percent of the voters in her precinct were African American. The Spencers alleged that the Hamilton County Board of Elections and the Hamilton County Republican Party combined to implement a voter challenge system at the polls on Election Day that discriminated against African American voters. The United States District Court For The Southern District Of Ohio Western Division granted the Spencers' motion for a temporary restraining order. US District Court Judge Susan J. Dlott, appointed by President Bill Clinton in 1995, ruled against the Republican plan, noting that there is no need to have voter challengers since Ohio already requires the presence of election judges at precincts in order to avoid voter fraud. Dlott warned in her decision that the Republican plan, if permitted, could cause "chaos, delay, intimidation and pandemonium inside the polls and in the lines outside the door." She noted "that 14 percent of new voters in a majority white location will face a challenger… but 97 percent of new voters in a majority African American voting location will see such a challenger." Dlott also said that the law permitting challengers did not sufficiently protect citizens' fundamental right to vote. The Spencers were represented by Cincinnati attorney Alphonse Gerhardstein.

== Personal life ==
In 1940, Spencer married Donald Andrew Spencer Sr., a Cincinnati teacher and real estate broker. They had two sons. The family lived in the Avondale neighborhood. She died at the age of 99 on July 9, 2019.
