= Gallia–Meigs Regional Airport =

Gallia-Meigs Regional Airport
- IATA: N/A; ICAO: KGAS; FAA LID: GAS; LID: GAS

Summary
- Airport type: Public
- Owner: Gallia–Meigs Regional Airport Authority
- Serves: Gallipolis, Ohio, Pomeroy, Ohio
- Location: Gallipolis, Ohio, United States
- Time zone: UTC−05:00 (-5)
  - Summer (DST): UTC−04:00 (-4)
- Elevation AMSL: 566 ft (173 m)
- Coordinates: 38°50′2.8″N 82°9′48.35″W

Map
- Location of airport in Ohio GAS (the United States)

Runways
Direction	Length		Surface
Direction	ft	m	Surface
5/23	3,999	1,219	Asphalt

Statistics (2021)
- Aircraft Operations: 18,615
- Source: Federal Aviation Administration

Gallia–Meigs Regional Airport (ICAO: KGAS, FAA LID: GAS) is a publicly owned, public use airport located in Gallipolis, Ohio, United States.

The airport is named after Gallia County and Meigs County.

== History ==
The airport was built with the combined money from both Gallia and Meigs Counties.

In April 1967, it was anticipated that the former Gallipolis State Farm would be selected as site for the airport.

The airport was used by Governor Jim Rhodes in mid December 1967 to survey the site of the Silver Bridge disaster. The airport had not yet been dedicated at the time and runway lighting had to be hooked up to emergency power to allow his plane to land at night. The incident subsequently provided an impetus to speed up completion of the airport.

The airport was planned to be dedicated on 22 September 1968. A federal grant approved in November paid for the construction of an access road to the airport.

Plans to replace the airport beacon and terminal were announced in June 2024. The county applied for federal grants to repave and expand the apron in January 2026.

== Facilities and aircraft ==
The airport has one runway, designated as runway 5/23. It measures 3999 x 75 ft (1219 x 23 m) and is paved with asphalt. The airport received a $1 million grant in 2015 to rehabilitate its runway. The runway was re-surfaced, and the surrounding lawn's soil was replaced, seeded, and mulched.

The airport has a fixed-base operator that offers fuel and limited amenities.

For the 12-month period ending June 15, 2021, the airport had 18,615 aircraft operations, an average of 51 per day. This included 98% general aviation, 1% military, and <1% air taxi. For the same time period, there were 16 aircraft based at the airport: 13 single- and 2 multi-engine airplanes as well as 1 helicopter.

== Accidents and incidents ==
- On 27 October 1978, two airplanes collided while attempting to land at the airport, killing one and injuring four.
- On July 23, 2021, a Cessna 152 was substantially damaged during take-off from Gallia-Meigs Regional Airport. The instructor and student onboard had completed successful takeoffs and landings before switching to the opposite runway. During a takeoff attempt, the aircraft hit a deer, and the instructor took control of the aircraft and brought it to a stop. Neither person onboard was injured. The probable cause of the accident was found to be the collision with a deer during the take-off roll.
- On October 2, 2023, a Piper PA-28 was damaged on landing at Gallia Meigs Regional Airport. The aircraft's nose gear collapsed on landing and the airplane veered off the runway, striking runway lights.

== See also ==
- List of airports in Ohio
