= Alice S. Deletombe =

American poet

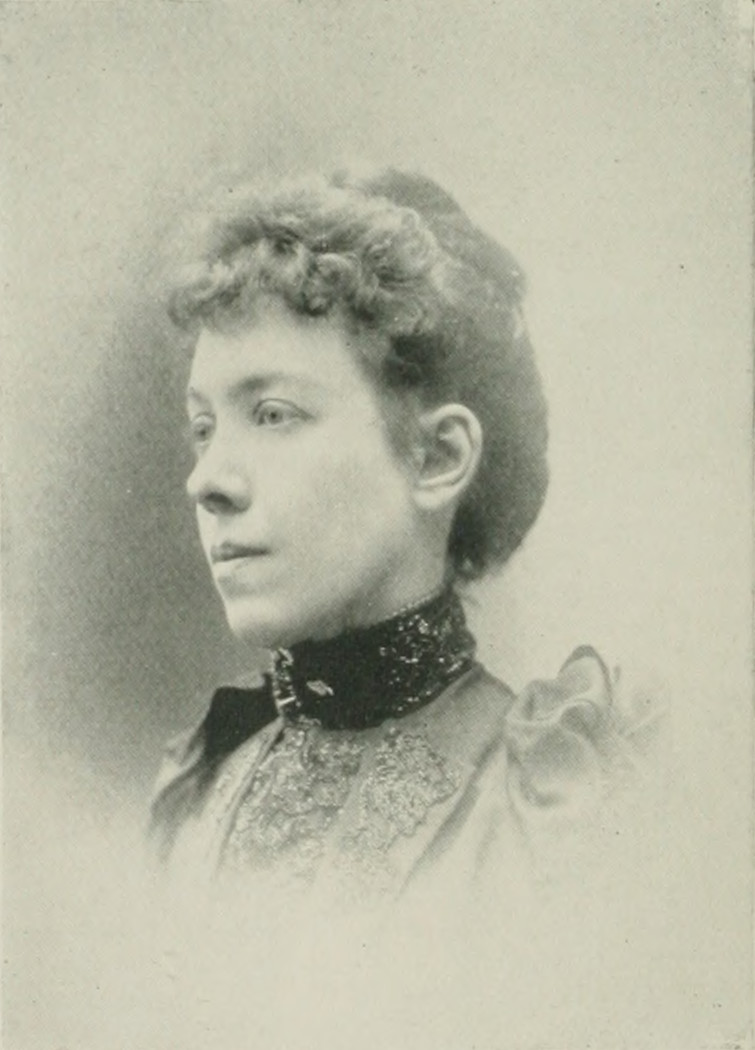
Portrait photo in A Woman of the Century

Alice S. Deletombe (1854–1929) was an American poet from Gallipolis, Ohio.

== Life and literary career ==
Alice Deletombe was born into a prominent French family in Gallipolis, Ohio, on April 2, 1854. Deletombe's poems appeared in several publications, including an 1891 issue of The Magazine of Poetry and Literary Review. Her work was also published in the Catholic publication The Rosary Magazine, in alignment with her Catholic faith.

In 1893, Deletombe was featured in the book A Woman of the Century by suffragists Frances Willard and Mary Livermore.

Deletombe died on December 5, 1929, at the age of 75.
