= Miron Elisha Hard =

American mycologist(1845–1914)

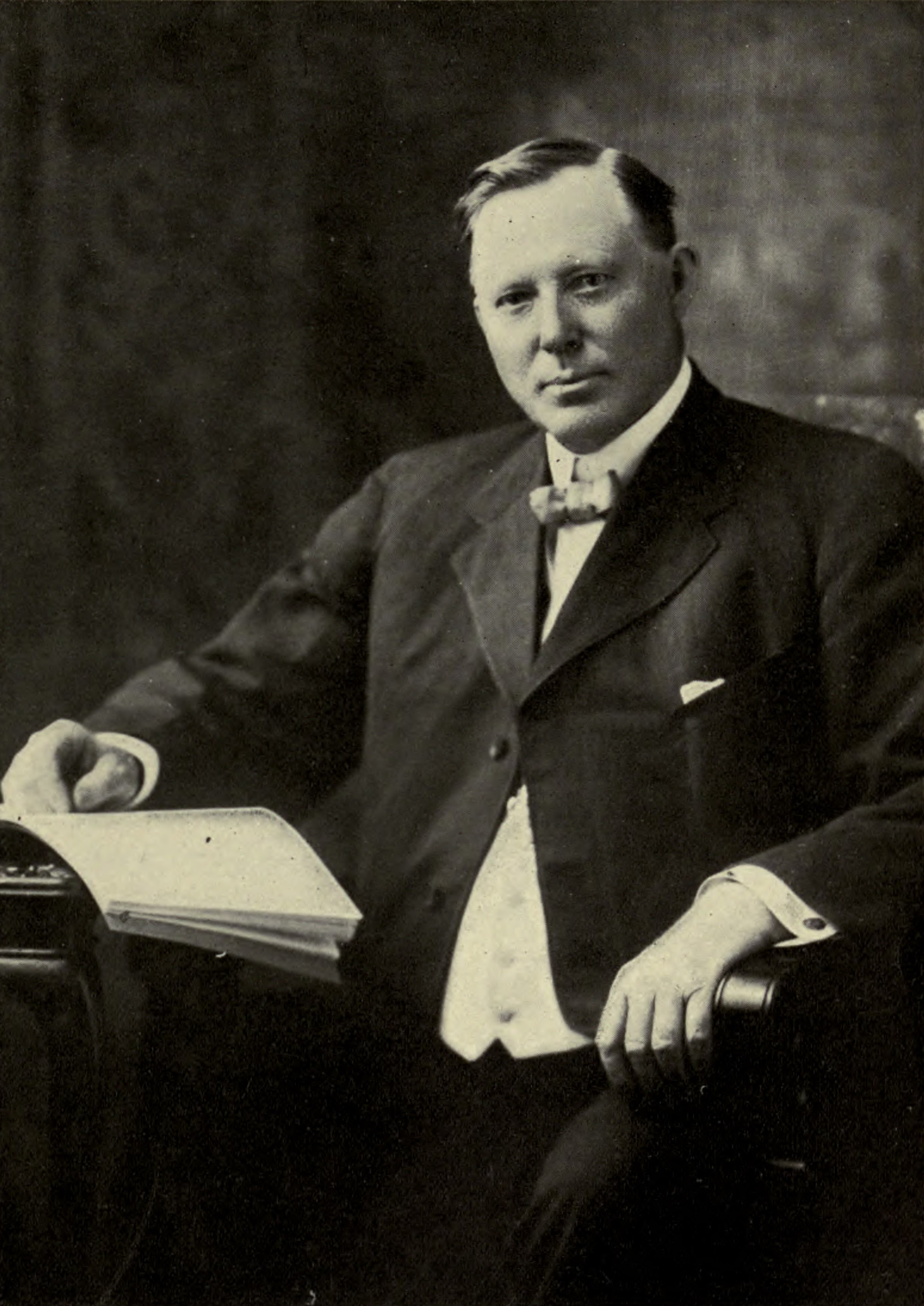
- Born: 6 December 1849
- Died: 6 October 1914 (aged 64)
- Occupation: Educator
- Known for: The Mushroom, Edible and Otherwise

Miron Elisha Hard (born Columbus, Ohio, December 6, 1849; died Jacksonville, Florida, October 6, 1914) was an American educator and amateur mycologist.

== Life and career ==
Hard was the son of Albert Hard (1813-1876) and Margaret (Galbraith) Hard; he had at least one brother, Norton James Hard (1845-1908). Hard attended Ohio Wesleyan University in Delaware, Ohio, and also received a master's degree there in 1876.

Hard was a high school principal in Gallipolis, Ohio from 1873 to 1875 and in Washington Court House, Ohio starting in 1879. He later served as the superintendent of schools in Chillicothe, Ohio, Salem, Ohio (1887-1897), and other districts, spending time in Bowling Green, Ohio (1897-1900), Sidney, Ohio, and Kirkwood, Missouri.

Around 1913 Hard and his wife built a home in Indian River County, Florida (then part of St. Lucie County).

== Mushrooms ==
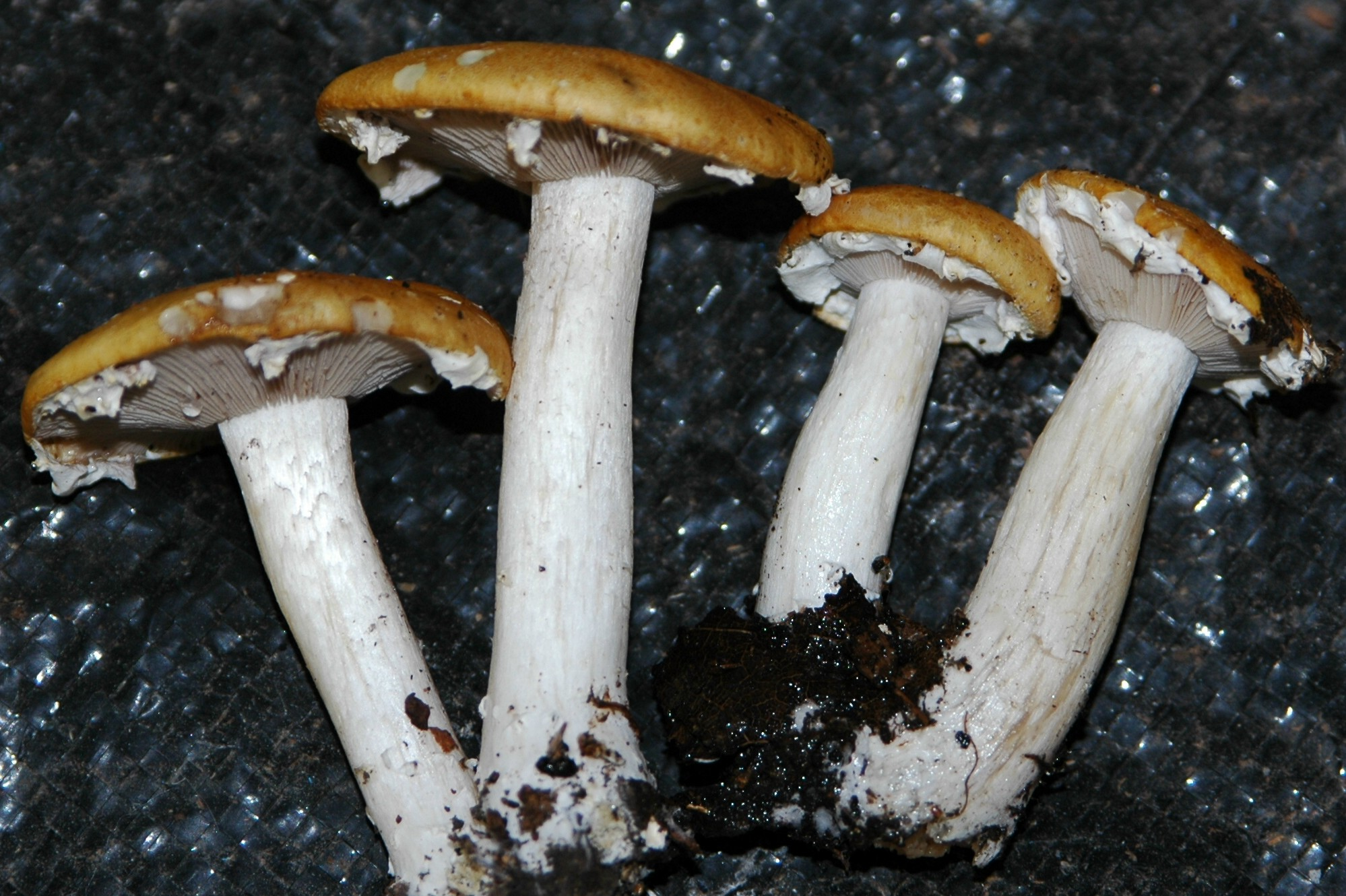
Stropharia hardii G.F. Atk; named in Hard's honor

Hard wrote in his 1908 book "The Mushroom, Edible and Otherwise" that he became interested in mushrooms while he was superintendent of schools in Salem, Ohio when he observed Bohemian immigrant children collecting mushrooms in the fields and forests around the town. By the time he published his book Hard had spent many years collecting and commissioning photographs of the mushrooms of Ohio. His book has a preface by Ohio State University mycologist William Ashbrook Kellerman, who in an advance review of the book described Hard affectionately as "that mushroom-hunter, mushroom-eater, mushroom-writer, as it were, mushroom-fiend..."

While researching for the book, Hard brought several new species to the attention of mycologists. For example, George Francis Atkinson in 1906 noted two new species, Naucoria paludosella (now Pholiota paludosella) and Stropharia hardii sent to him by Hard and Kellerman, naming the second one in Hard's honor. Hard's book received favorable reviews at the time and in 1976 when it was reprinted by Dover Publications.

Hard contributed a journal article, "An Interesting Cordyceps", to the June 1906 Mycological Bulletin.

The standard author abbreviation Hard is used to indicate this person as the author when citing a botanical name.

== Family ==
Hard married Elizabeth Catherine Shallcross (1844-1931) on December 29, 1874. They had two daughters, Honora E. Hard (1881-1965) and Anita L. Hard Wilson (1883-1961).
