= Statue of Marian Spencer =

Statue in Cincinnati, Ohio, U.S.

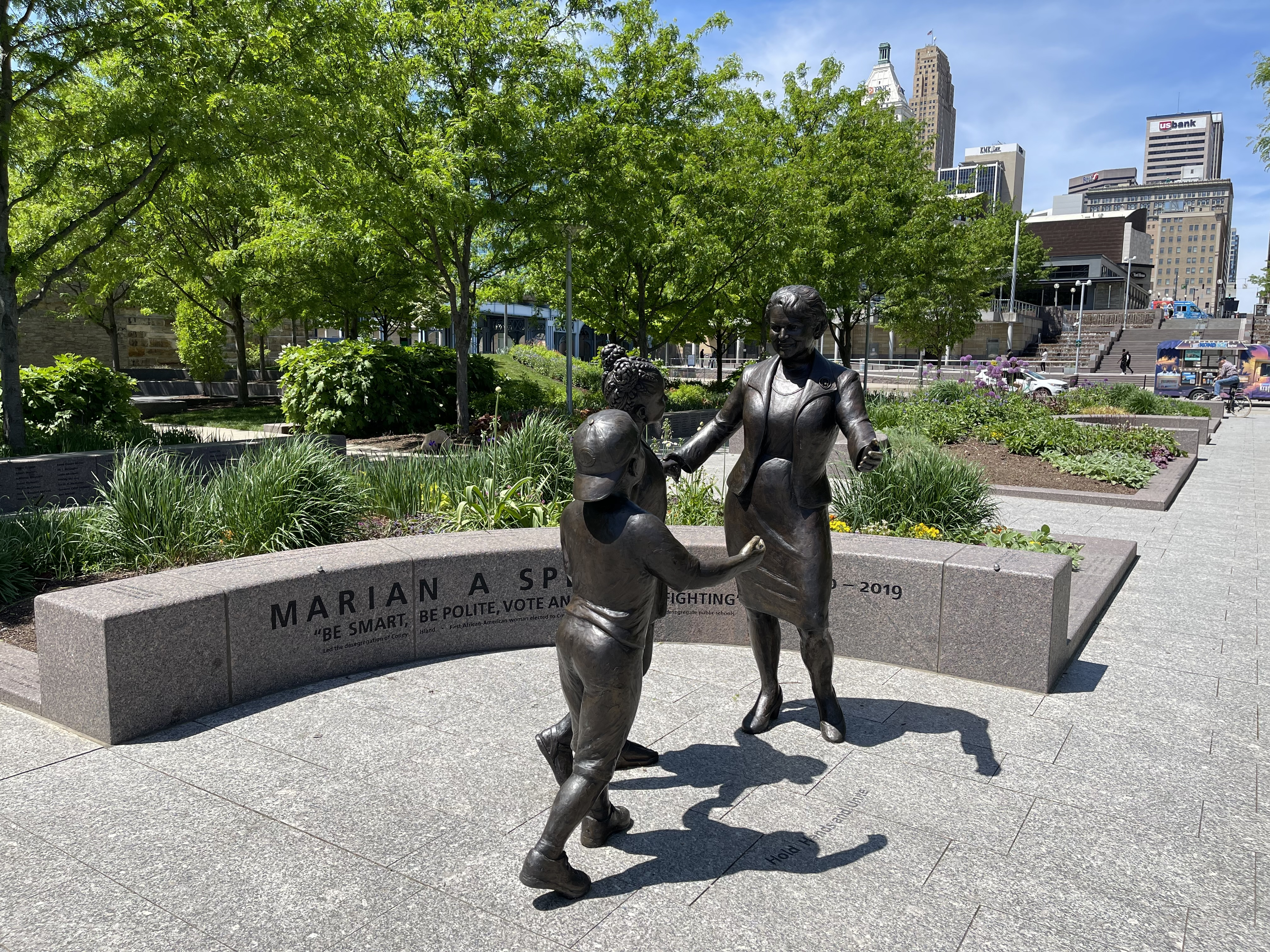
- Year: 2021
- Medium: Bronze sculpture
- Subject: Marian Spencer
- Location: Cincinnati, Ohio, U.S.; 39°5′44.4″N 84°30′35.7″W

A statue of the civil rights activist and politician Marian Spencer by Tom Tsuchiya was installed in Cincinnati's Smale Park, in the U.S. state of Ohio, in 2021.
