= Gallipolis City School District =

School district in Ohio

Address
- 61 State Street Gallipolis, Ohio, 45631; United States

District information
- Type: Public
- Grades: PreK–12
- NCES District ID: 3904403

Students and staff
- Students: 1,999
- Teachers: 107.23 (FTE)
- Staff: 146.19 (FTE)
- Student–teacher ratio: 18.64

Other information
- Website: www.gallipoliscityschools.k12.oh.us

The Gallipolis City School District is a public school district based in Gallipolis, Ohio, United States.

The school district includes all of Clay, Gallipolis, Green townships, most of Raccoon Township as well as small portions of Addison, Springfield, and Perry townships in Gallia County.

Two incorporated villages are served by Gallipolis City Schools: Gallipolis and Rio Grande.

== Schools ==
- Gallia Academy High School
- Gallia Academy Middle School
- Green Elementary School
- Rio Grande Elementary School
- Washington Elementary School
- Clay Alternative School

== See also ==
- List of school districts in Ohio
