= Donald Andrew Spencer Sr. =

Donald Andrew Spencer Sr. (March 5, 1915 – May 4, 2010) was one of the first African American realtors in Cincinnati, the first African American broker to join the Cincinnati Board of Realtors, the first African American broker to serve as President of the Cincinnati Board of Realtors, and the first African American trustee at Ohio University in Athens, Ohio. He was appointed trustee of Ohio University by former Ohio Governor John J. Gilligan. He was the first African American to chair the Ohio University board of trustees in 1979 and served on the Ohio University board from 1974 to 1983. He was also the charter member of the Beta Eta chapter of Kappa Alpha Psi, a predominantly African American fraternity, at the University of Cincinnati. He chartered the chapter in 1939.

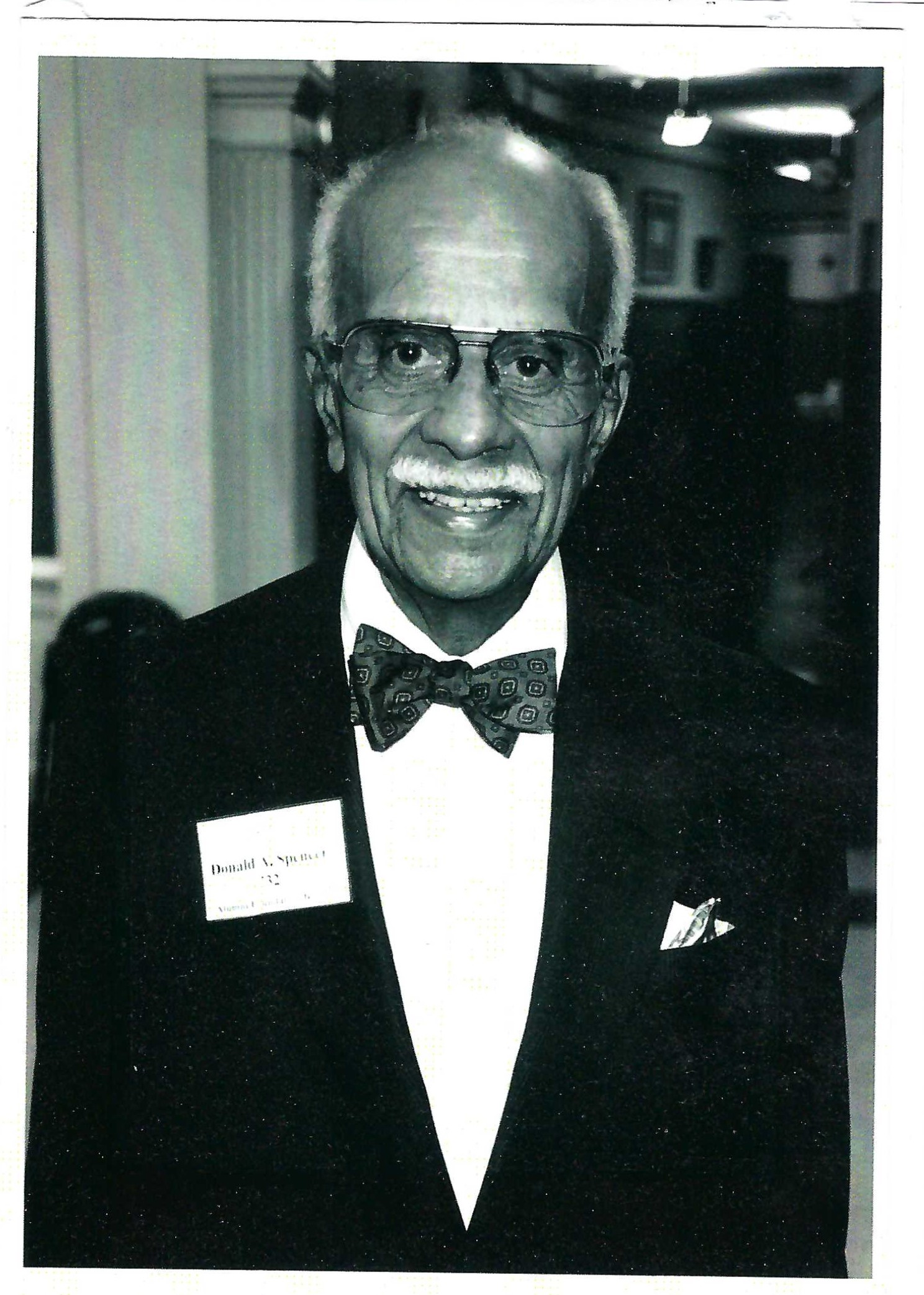
Donald Andrew Spencer, Sr. in 2010

== Personal life ==
The grandson of a slave, he grew up in Cincinnati with his mother, Josephine; his father, Charles; his brother, Joseph; and his sister, Valerie. Donald Spencer graduated from Walnut Hills High School in 1932. He was also a graduate of the University of Cincinnati, with the Bachelor of Arts in Chemistry, Bachelor of Education, and Master of Education degrees. While at the University of Cincinnati, Donald Spencer founded Quadres, a campus organization that promoted equal opportunities for African American students. He married Marian Spencer in 1940 in Marian Spencer’s hometown of Gallipolis, Ohio. They have two sons, Donald Jr. and Edward Alexander. They have two grandsons, Matthew and Oliver, and one granddaughter, Benita.

== Career ==
Before becoming a realtor and lifelong civil rights activist, Donald Spencer was a school teacher in the Cincinnati Public Schools. He taught for the Cincinnati Public Schools for eighteen years. He taught at Harriet Beecher Stowe Elementary School in the West End, Cincinnati neighborhood. He taught at Frederick Douglass Elementary School in the Walnut Hills, Cincinnati neighborhood. He also taught at Bloom Junior High School.

He was the first African American broker to join the Cincinnati Board of Realtors in 1986, and was later elected president of the organization. He also served as a member of the organization’s statewide legislative committee in Ohio. When he joined the Cincinnati Board of Realtors, he accepted his post only after clearly stating his non-allegiance to any covert housing restrictions the board might endorse. He was active with PAC, the national policy-making commission of the National Association of Real Estate Brokers. He was the founder of his real estate firm, Donald A. Spencer and Associates. The firm grew to twenty-three associates with offices in Walnut Hills, Cincinnati and Avondale, Cincinnati.

He was a successful businessman and real estate developer. He was a lifetime member of the NAACP. Donald Spencer was also an accomplished jazz musician who wrote two musical plays, Who’da Thought It and Watcha' Doin' Now, and his works were performed at the University of Cincinnati and he sponsored a performance of his musical plays at the Cincinnati Art Museum.

A lifelong supporter of Cincinnati Public Schools, Spencer chaired the 2001 campaign, successfully passing the November tax levy. In 2003, he served with CASE, Cincinnatians Active in the Support of Education, which led to the passing of the $435-million levy to build 35 new schools and renovate the remaining 31 buildings. In 2005, he was named a "Great Living Cincinnatian" by the Cincinnati USA Regional Chamber. He was the first recipient of this award to be married to a previous recipient, his wife Marian Spencer.

In 2006, he received an Honorary Doctorate of Humane Letters from the University of Cincinnati. In 2010, the Cincinnati Public Schools renamed an elementary school in Walnut Hills, Cincinnati the Donald A. and Marian Spencer Education Center.

Donald Spencer with his wife, in 1992, established the Donald and Marian Spencer Endowment for the African American Library Collection at Ohio University. Donald and Marian Spencer received honorary degrees from Ohio University in 1994. Donald Spencer was involved with the Avondale Community Council, Cincinnati Board of Housing Appeals, Cincinnati USA Regional Chamber and YMCA of Greater Cincinnati. The Donald A. Spencer Achievement Award was established in his honor to recognize the accomplishments of minority students at Ohio University and the Blackburn-Spencer Scholarship and Achievement Awards were named in part for him. He served on the boards of Ohio University (two years as president), Ohio Valley Goodwill, the Fenwick Club, and Family Housing Developers. He was a founding board member of the Friends of Cincinnati Parks and an executive board member of the Walnut Hills High School Foundation, which developed a $12-million addition to the public high school with private funds, a first in the United States. He also was active in the Boys Club, the Cincinnatus Association, the City of Cincinnati Board of Housing Appeals, the Task Force on Racial Isolation in Cincinnati Public Schools, and Cincinnati’s Historic Conservation Board. He was a trustee for thirty years at Mt. Zion United Methodist Church, now the New Vision United Methodist Church. In 1997, he received the Charles P. Taft Civic Gumption Award from the Cincinnati Charter Committee of the Charter Party. In 2001 the Cincinnati Park Board created the Donald A. Spencer Overlook in Eden Park to recognize his years of service to the park system. Donald Spencer received the Founders’ Citation from the Ohio University Board of Trustees, and was one of only fourteen people to receive the honor in the university’s 200-year history.

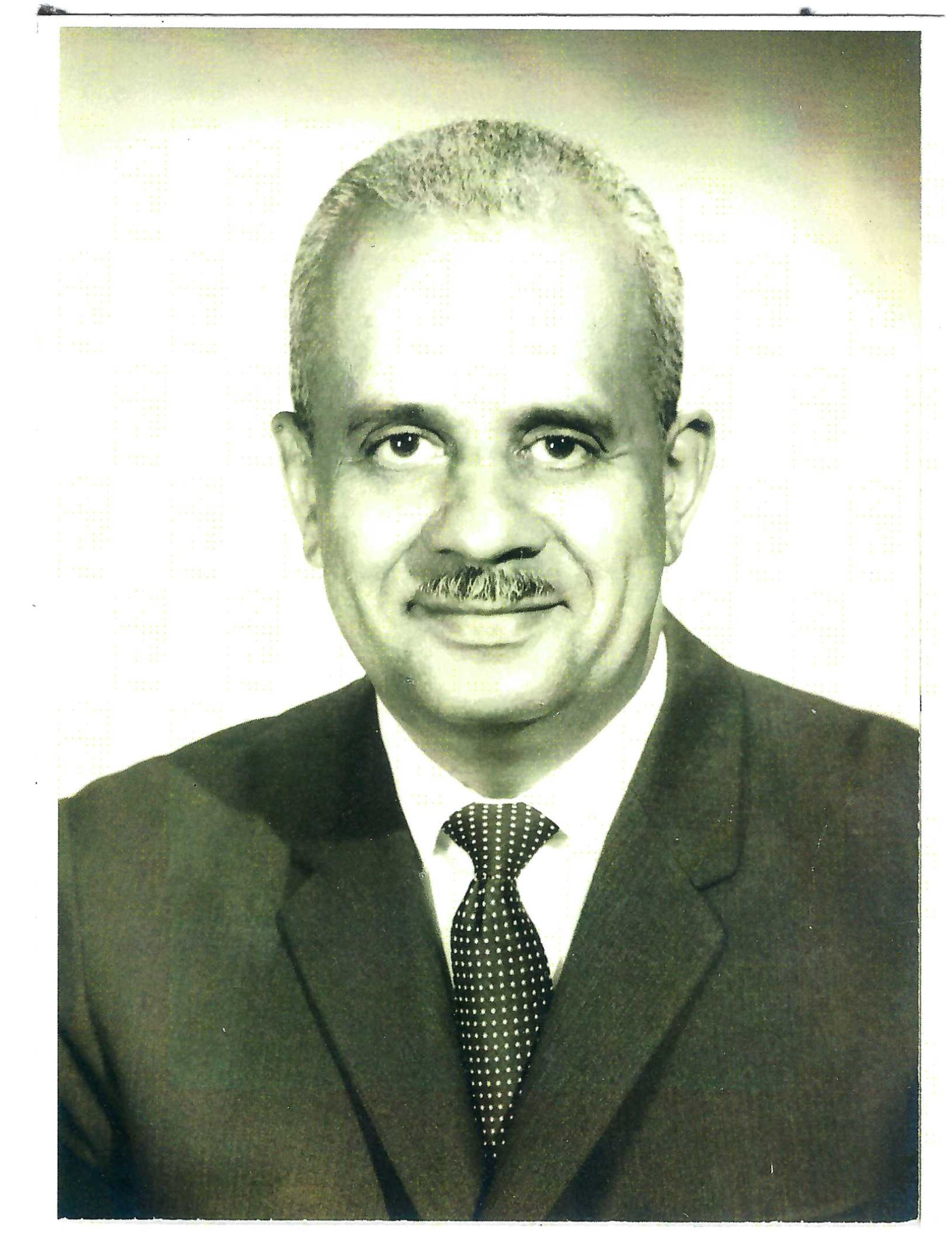
Donald Andrew Spencer, Sr. in 1971

"My philosophy in life has been when you leave this world it should be better because you have lived," Spencer said.

== Legal challenges ==
Donald Spencer helped his wife, Marian, integrate Coney Island, Cincinnati, Ohio in 1952 through a lawsuit in which she was the plaintiff.

In 2004, Donald Spencer and his wife, Marian Spencer, initiated litigation seeking to restrain Defendants J. Kenneth Blackwell, in his official capacity as the Secretary of State of Ohio, Intervenor Defendant State of Ohio, the Hamilton County Board of Elections and its Chair Timothy Burke and members Michael Barrett, Todd Ward, Daniel Radford and Director John Williams in their official capacities from discriminating against black voters in Hamilton County, Ohio on the basis of race. The Spencers sought to restrain the Defendants from allowing challengers at the polls in Hamilton County.

Donald and Marian Spencer resided in Avondale, Cincinnati, a predominantly African-American neighborhood. The Spencers were legally registered African American voters who voted in ward 13; precinct H. Marian Spencer estimated that one hundred percent of the voters in her precinct were African American. The Spencers alleged that the Hamilton County Board of Elections and the Hamilton County Republican Party combined to implement a voter challenge system at the polls on Election Day that discriminated against African American voters. The United States District Court For The Southern District Of Ohio Western Division granted the Spencers' motion for a temporary restraining order. US District Court Judge Susan J. Dlott, appointed by President Bill Clinton in 1995, ruled against the Republican plan, noting that there is no need to have voter challengers since Ohio already requires the presence of election judges at precincts in order to avoid voter fraud. Dlott warned in her decision that the Republican plan, if permitted, could cause "chaos, delay, intimidation and pandemonium inside the polls and in the lines outside the door." She noted "that 14 percent of new voters in a majority white location will face a challenger… but 97 percent of new voters in a majority African American voting location will see such a challenger." Dlott also said that the law permitting challengers did not sufficiently protect citizens’ fundamental right to vote. The Spencers were represented by Cincinnati attorney Alphonse Gerhardstein.

== Legacy ==
Donald Spencer was a respected friend of prominent Black Cincinnatians Cincinnati Mayor Theodore M. Berry and Judge Nathaniel R. Jones, who was among those who eulogized him at his funeral.
