= Gallia Academy High School =

Public secondary school in Ohio, United States

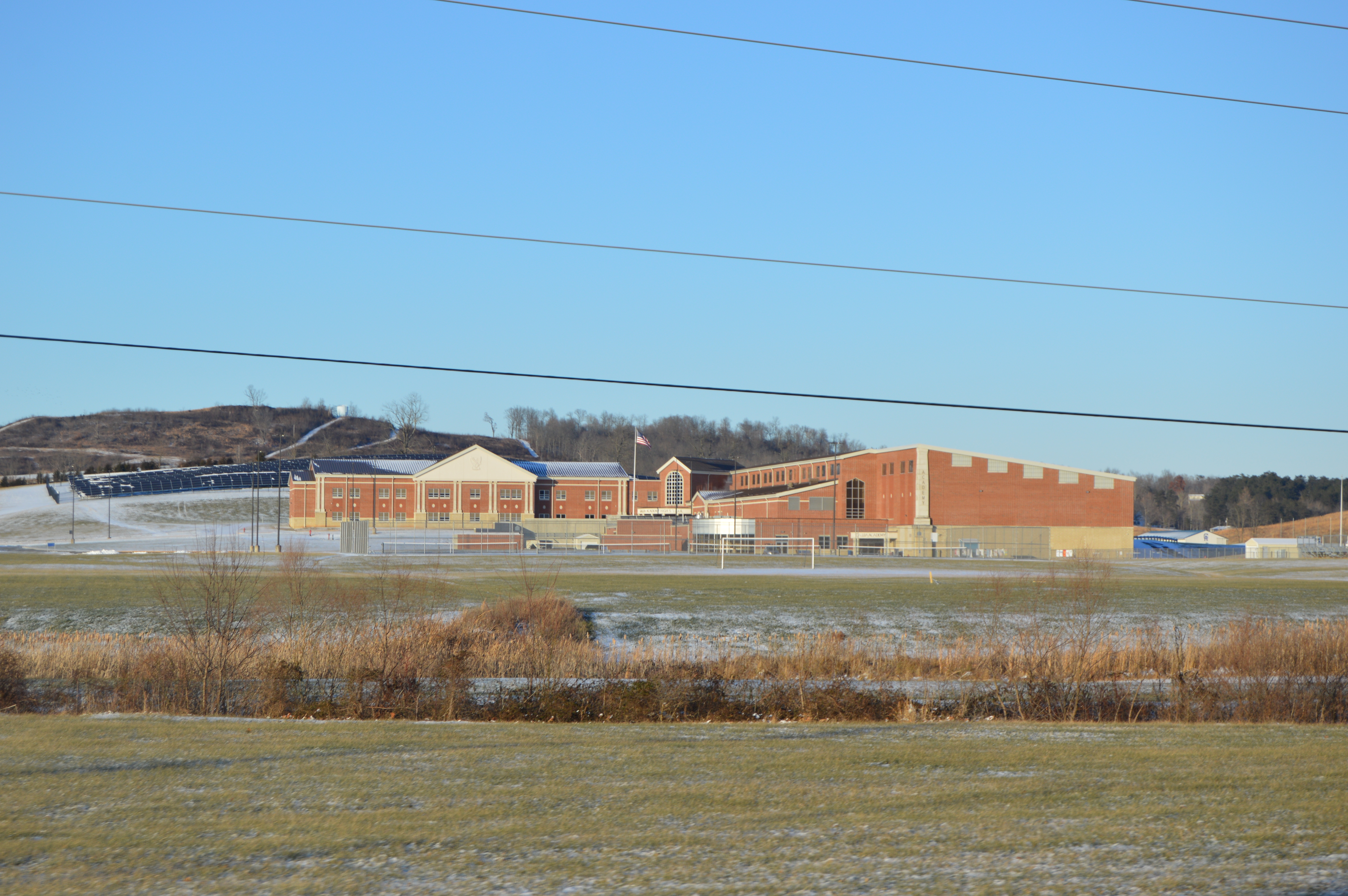
- Distant view from State Route 141

Location
- 2855 Centenary Road; Gallipolis, (Gallia County), Ohio 45631; United States; 38°48′16.9344″N 82°15′44.9028″W

Information
- Type: Public high school
- School district: Gallipolis City School District
- Superintendent: Craig Wright
- Principal: LisaJo Blakeman
- Teaching staff: 29.80 (FTE)
- Grades: 9-12
- Student to teacher ratio: 16.68
- Colors: Blue and White
- Fight song: GAHS Fight Song
- Athletics conference: Ohio Valley Conference
- Team name: Blue Devils
- Rivals: River Valley Raiders Fairland Dragons Point Pleasant Black Knights
- Accreditation: North Central Association of Colleges and Schools
- Website: School website

Gallia Academy High School (GAHS) is a public high school near Gallipolis at Centenary, Ohio, United States. It is the only high school in the Gallipolis City School District. The boys' sports teams are known as the Blue Devils, while the girls' teams are called the Blue Angels.

== History ==
GAHS was founded as a conscript school in 1811. The first official location was constructed in 1936. The original high school building was converted to a junior high school after construction of new facilities in the 1950s.

In 2005, the local community voted and approved a proposal to build a new campus on Centenary Road outside of downtown Gallipolis. The current Gallia Academy High School was completed in 2009 and has been in use since August 24, 2009.

== Athletics ==
The Gallipolis Gallia Academy Blue Devils have been a part of the Ohio Valley Conference, since 2016-17.

== Notable alumni ==
- James B. Aleshire, U.S. Army major general
- William H. Nash, US Army brigadier general
- Dave Roberts, Major League Baseball pitcher
- Ryan Smith, 103rd Speaker of the Ohio House of Representatives
- Marian Spencer, civil rights activist and former Vice-Mayor, Cincinnati,
- Tom Spencer, former MLB player (Chicago White Sox)
- Robert M. Switzer, US Representative from Ohio
