= University of Rio Grande =

Community college in Rio Grande, Ohio, US

University of Rio Grande and Rio Grande Community College
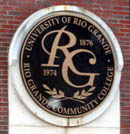
- Official seal at the campus entrance in 2007
- Former name: Rio Grande College (1876–1989)
- Motto: Changing Tomorrows
- Type: Private university and public community college
- Established: September 13, 1876; 150 years ago
- Parent institution: University System of Ohio
- Endowment: $21,853,211
- President: Ryan Smith
- Provost: David Lawrence
- Students: 2,300
- Undergraduates: 2,140
- Postgraduates: 160
- Location: Rio Grande, Ohio, United States; 38°52′49″N 82°22′36″W
- Campus: Rural, 190 acres (77 ha)
- Colors: Red & White
- Nickname: RedStorm
- Sporting affiliations: NAIA – River States (primary); NAIA – Mid-South (wrestling, volleyball)
- Website: rio.edu/

The University of Rio Grande and Rio Grande Community College (originally Rio Grande College) is a private university and public community college merged into one institution in Rio Grande, Ohio, United States. It is accredited by the Higher Learning Commission (HLC).

== History ==
=== Early history ===
Ira Haning, a Free Will Baptist minister, persuaded Nehemiah and Permelia Atwood, affluent residents and entrepreneurs, to use their wealth to establish a college. Following Nehemiah's death in 1869, the responsibility for making this dream a reality fell to his wife Permelia. In 1873, Permelia Ridgeway Atwood established an endowment and deeded 10 acres (4.0 ha) of land for Rio Grande College, which officially opened on September 13, 1876. In its first year, Ransom Dunn was president as well as professor of mental and moral philosophy.

== Athletics ==
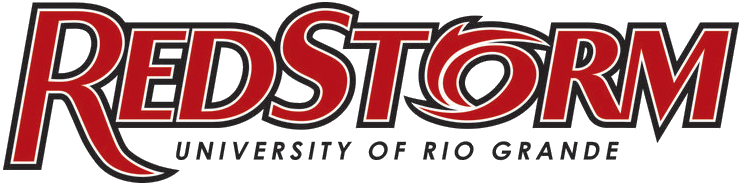
Rio Grande athletics wordmark

The Rio Grande athletic teams are called the RedStorm. The university is a member of the National Association of Intercollegiate Athletics (NAIA), primarily competing in the River States Conference (RSC) since the 2014–15 academic year; which they were a member on a previous stint from 1964–65 to 1970–71. The RedStorm previously competed in the Mid-South Conference (MSC) from 2009–10 to 2013–14, and in the defunct American Mideast Conference (AMC) from 1971–72 to 2008–09.

Rio Grande competes in 26 intercollegiate varsity sports: Men's sports include baseball, basketball, bowling, cross country, football, golf, rugby, soccer, track & field (indoor & outdoor), volleyball, and wrestling; while women's sports include basketball, bowling, cross country, golf, rugby, soccer, softball, track & field (indoor & outdoor), and volleyball; and co-ed sports include bass fishing, cheerleading, dance, and eSports. Football, which had been dropped after the 1949 season, will return in 2025, competing in the Appalachian Athletic Conference (AAC).

== Notable alumni ==
- Bernie Bickerstaff, former NBA head coach and executive.
- Matthew Boyles, professional race walker.
- Frank Cremeans, represented the state of Ohio in the United States House of Representatives.
- Bevo Francis, a legendary basketball player, put Rio Grande on the map in 1954 when he scored 113 points in a single game against Hillsdale College. Francis' feat stood as an NCAA record for 58 years until Jack Taylor of Grinnell College broke the mark with a 138-point performance against Faith Baptist Bible College on November 20, 2012.
- Kendell Foster Crossen, pulp fiction and science fiction writer.
- Ben Hunter, professional soccer player.
- Bernard Lepkofker, competitive judoka
- George Poffenbarger, justice of the West Virginia Supreme Court of Appeals.
- Tom Spencer, retired Major League Baseball outfielder
- Robert M. Switzer, former U.S. Representative from Ohio.
