= Powellsville, Ohio =

Unincorporated community in Ohio, U.S.

Coordinates: 38°40′00″N 82°47′01″W

Powellsville is an unincorporated community in Scioto County, in the U.S. state of Ohio.

== History ==
Powellsville was platted about 1848 by William Powell and others, and named for its founder. A post office was established in Powellsville in 1860, and remained in operation until 1906. In 1990, a 4310 gram chondrite (H5) meteorite was found ~40 cm underground by a man digging out a tree stump in his yard.
