= Gallipolis, Ohio =

- Village
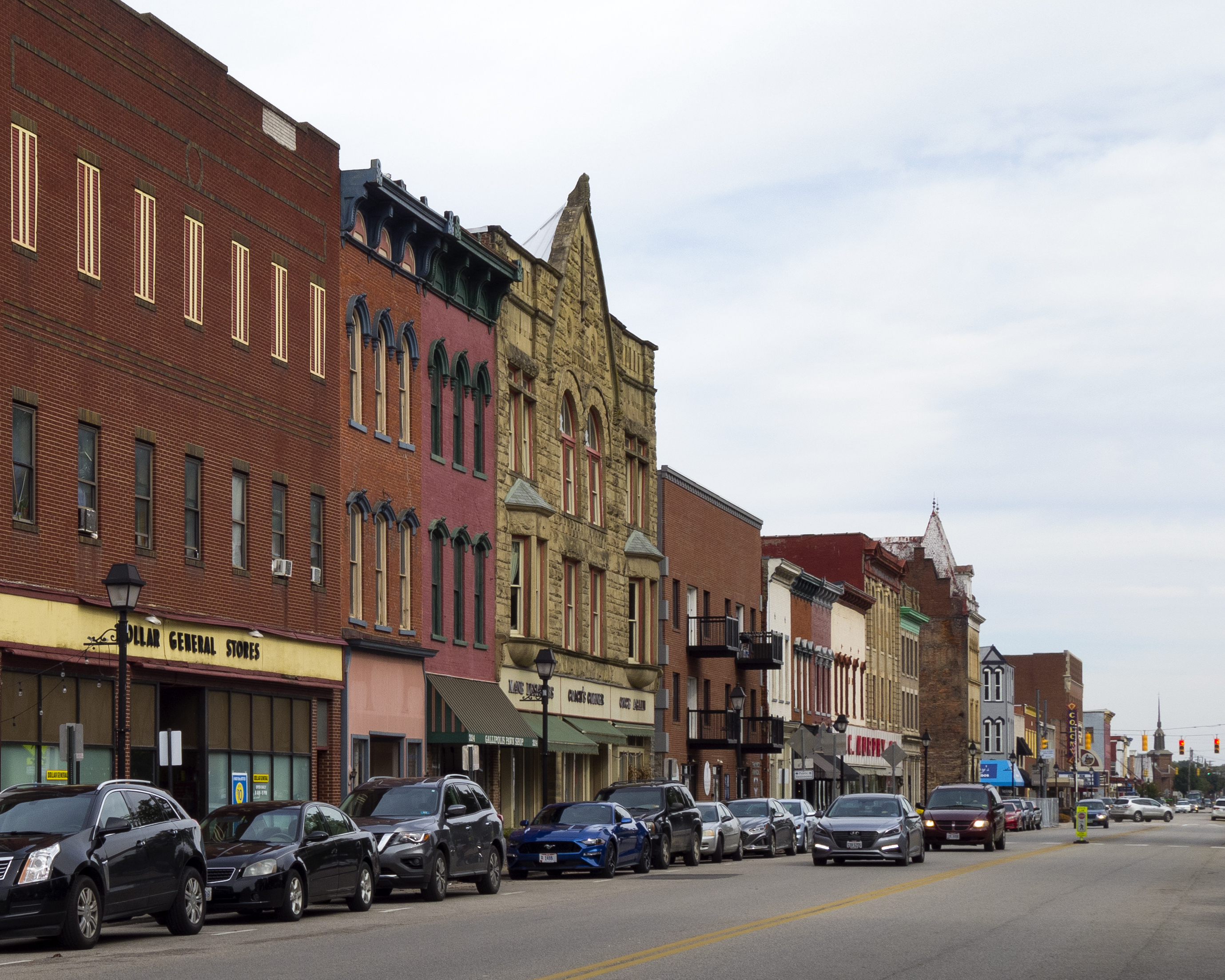
- Downtown Gallipolis
- Nickname: City of the Gauls
- Interactive map of Gallipolis, Ohio
- Location within Ohio Location within the United States
- Coordinates: 38°49′07″N 82°11′36″W
- Country: United States
- State: Ohio
- County: Gallia
- Township: Gallipolis
- Founded: October 17, 1790; 235 years ago

Area
  - Total: 3.83 sq mi (9.91 km^{2})
  - Land: 3.60 sq mi (9.32 km^{2})
  - Water: 0.23 sq mi (0.59 km^{2})
- Elevation: 571 ft (174 m)

Population (2020)
  - Total: 3,313
  - Estimate (2023): 3,284
  - Density: 920.9/sq mi (355.57/km^{2})
- Time zone: UTC-5 (Eastern (EST))
  - Summer (DST): UTC-4 (EDT)
- ZIP code: 45631
- Area code: 740
- FIPS code: 39-29204
- GNIS feature ID: 2398939
- Website: Village of Gallipolis website

Gallipolis (/ˌɡæləpəˈliːs/ GAL-ə-pə-LEESS) is a village in Gallia County, Ohio, United States, and its county seat. It is located in Southeast Ohio along the Ohio River about 55 miles (89 km) southeast of Chillicothe and 44 miles (71 km) northwest of Charleston, West Virginia. The population was 3,313 at the 2020 census. Gallipolis is the second-largest community in the rural Point Pleasant micropolitan area, which includes all of Gallia County, Ohio, and Mason County, West Virginia.

== History ==
Gallipolis was first settled by Europeans in 1790: "The French 500" were a group of French aristocrats, merchants, and artisans who were fleeing the violence and disruption of the French Revolution. They were led by Count Jean-Joseph de Barth, an Alsatian member of the French National Assembly. It was the second city to be founded in the newly organized Northwest Territory of the United States, after Marietta, Ohio. Its name comes from its Gallic heritage ("The city of the Gauls") and is known as "The Old French City" because of this beginning.

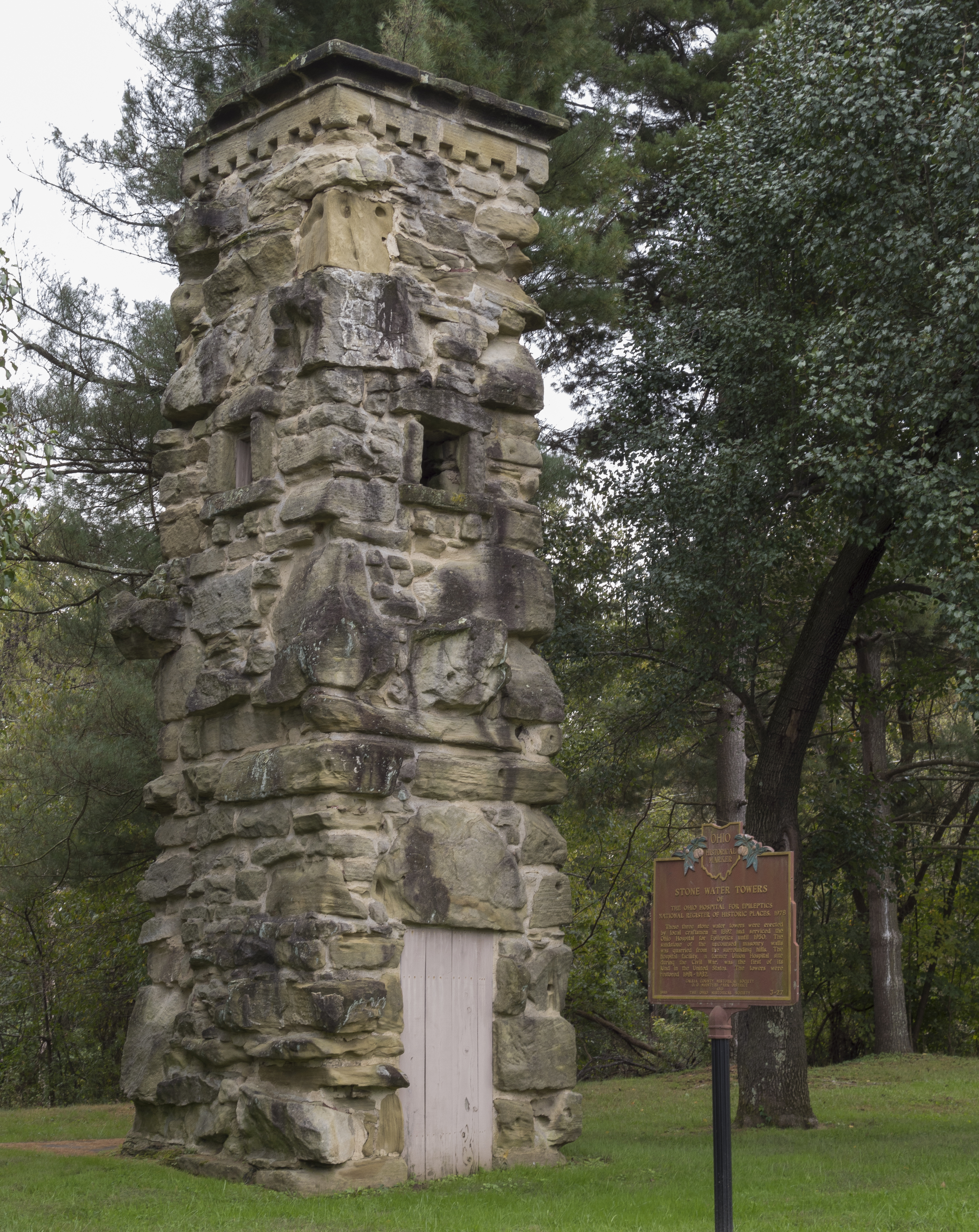
The Gallipolis Epileptic Hospital Stone Water Towers, built in 1892, are listed on the National Register of Historic Places.

This was a time of rampant land speculation in the Northwest Territory, recently opened for settlement after it was organized following the Northwest Indian Wars. The French had worked with the Scioto Company, a purported land development company registered in Paris in 1789, paying its agents for land along the Ohio River. They sailed to the United States on several ships, most to Alexandria, Virginia, outside Washington, DC. From there they traveled over land and by the Ohio River to reach Gallipolis. The French were city people and were taken aback by the undeveloped frontier they encountered.

When they arrived at the Gallipolis area, they learned their deeds of land were worthless. The Scioto Company did not own the land, for which the Ohio Company had an option for development. They survived somehow, building cabins close together in what is now City Park, with a defensive palisade and bastions. In 1795, President George Washington's administration granted the settlers free land in the French Grant in southwest present-day Scioto County, Ohio. Under the terms of this grant, settlers had to live on the land for 5 years and show cultivation to become owners. Settlers who chose to stay in Gallipolis had to pay again for their plots, this time to the Ohio Company. Most either sold their land in the French Grant or arranged to have tenants farm it.

The name Gallipolis is a construct of the Greek or Latin prefix "Galli-" and the Greek suffix "-polis", meaning "city of the French". A US post office called Gallipolis began operating there in 1794.

On November 30, 1893, the state-run Asylum for Epileptics and Epileptic Insane opened. Later it would become the Gallipolis Developmental Center, which is still operational today serving 52 patients with developmental disabilities in the Appalachian Ohio region.

On December 15, 1967, the Silver Bridge, connecting Gallipolis to Point Pleasant, West Virginia, across the Ohio River, collapsed under the weight of rush-hour traffic, resulting in the deaths of 46 people. It had been built in 1928, and analysis showed that the bridge was carrying much heavier loads than it had originally been designed for and had been poorly maintained. It was replaced by the Silver Memorial Bridge, completed in 1969. When the population dropped below 5,000, Gallipolis lost its city status and was classified as a village under state law. It continues to operate its government under its existing city charter.

== Geography ==
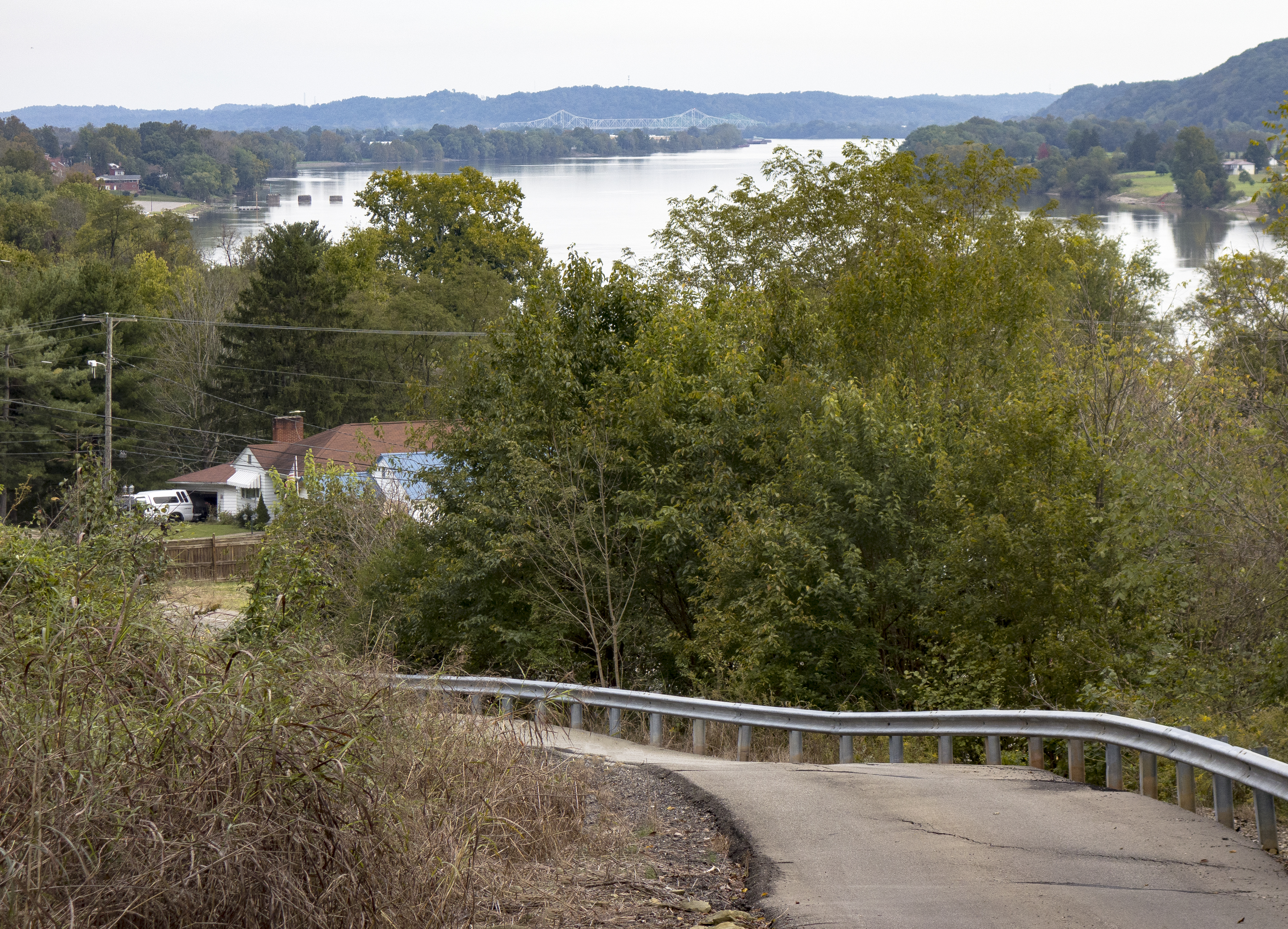
View up the Ohio River towards the Silver Memorial Bridge

Gallipolis is located along the Ohio River in the Appalachia region.

According to the United States Census Bureau, the village has a total area of 3.83 square miles (9.92 km^{2}), of which 3.60 square miles (9.32 km^{2}) is land and 0.23 square miles (0.60 km^{2}) is water. Gallipolis is located in the unglaciated hills of southeastern Ohio.

=== Climate ===
Gallipolis, like most of the state of Ohio, has a humid continental climate (Köppen Dfa) transitioning into the neighboring subtropical climate. The village experiences four distinct seasons, with hot, muggy summers, and cold, dry winters. The village is part of USDA Hardiness zone 6b. October is the driest month, with an average of 2.86 inches (73 mm) of precipitation.

Winters are cold, with an average January temperature of 34.3 °F (1.3 °C). Snowfall is generally very light, with a mean average snowfall of 10.9 inches (280 mm). The village does not experience lake-effect snow, although the village's weather can be influenced by the Great Lakes and regional topography. On average, there are 109 nights per year when the temperature drops to or below freezing, and only 14 days when the temperature fails to rise above freezing. Summers are hot and humid, with an average July temperature of 78.6 °F (25.9 °C). There are an average of 39 days per year with highs at or above 90 °F (32 °C).

Precipitation is generally heavier from the late spring to early summer (May through July), and on average Gallipolis receives 40.3 inches (1,020 mm) of precipitation annually; historically, annual precipitation has ranged from 27.28 inches (693 mm) in 1987 to 53.91 inches (1,369 mm) in 2004. Like many places in the Midwest, Gallipolis is subject to severe weather. During the spring and summer, severe thunderstorms may be accompanied by lightning, hail, flooding and tornadoes. Perhaps the most notable tornado event was the 1968 Wheelersburg tornado outbreak.

Climate data for Gallipolis, Ohio (1991–2020 normals, extremes 1934–present)
Month	Jan	Feb	Mar	Apr	May	Jun	Jul	Aug	Sep	Oct	Nov	Dec	Year
Record high °F (°C)	79 (26)	79 (26)	87 (31)	93 (34)	98 (37)	105 (41)	113 (45)	108 (42)	105 (41)	96 (36)	89 (32)	80 (27)	113 (45)
Mean daily maximum °F (°C)	41.0 (5.0)	45.5 (7.5)	54.7 (12.6)	67.1 (19.5)	75.1 (23.9)	82.9 (28.3)	86.2 (30.1)	85.6 (29.8)	79.8 (26.6)	68.4 (20.2)	56.1 (13.4)	45.4 (7.4)	65.6 (18.7)
Daily mean °F (°C)	32.1 (0.1)	35.4 (1.9)	43.5 (6.4)	54.4 (12.4)	63.8 (17.7)	72.2 (22.3)	75.9 (24.4)	74.9 (23.8)	68.4 (20.2)	56.6 (13.7)	45.1 (7.3)	36.8 (2.7)	54.9 (12.7)
Mean daily minimum °F (°C)	23.1 (−4.9)	25.2 (−3.8)	32.2 (0.1)	41.7 (5.4)	52.4 (11.3)	61.4 (16.3)	65.7 (18.7)	64.1 (17.8)	57.0 (13.9)	44.8 (7.1)	34.2 (1.2)	28.2 (−2.1)	44.2 (6.8)
Record low °F (°C)	−28 (−33)	−14 (−26)	−9 (−23)	16 (−9)	23 (−5)	34 (1)	43 (6)	39 (4)	27 (−3)	15 (−9)	0 (−18)	−13 (−25)	−28 (−33)
Average precipitation inches (mm)	3.07 (78)	3.08 (78)	4.05 (103)	3.92 (100)	4.48 (114)	4.61 (117)	4.47 (114)	3.55 (90)	3.75 (95)	3.12 (79)	2.63 (67)	3.80 (97)	44.53 (1,131)
Average precipitation days (≥ 0.01 in)	12.7	11.2	11.8	12.6	12.7	11.0	10.4	8.2	8.7	9.2	10.0	12.5	131.0
Source: NOAA

== Demographics ==
Historical population
Census	Pop.	Note	%±
1840	1,413		—
1850	1,686		19.3%
1860	3,418		102.7%
1870	3,711		8.6%
1880	4,400		18.6%
1890	4,498		2.2%
1900	5,432		20.8%
1910	5,560		2.4%
1920	6,670		20.0%
1930	7,106		6.5%
1940	7,833		10.2%
1950	7,871		0.5%
1960	8,775		11.5%
1970	7,490		−14.6%
1980	5,601		−25.2%
1990	4,831		−13.7%
2000	4,180		−13.5%
2010	3,641		−12.9%
2020	3,313		−9.0%
2023 (est.)	3,284	▼	−0.9%
U.S. Decennial Census

=== 2020 census ===
As of the 2020 census, Gallipolis had a population of 3,313. The median age was 43.0 years. 20.1% of residents were under the age of 18 and 22.7% of residents were 65 years of age or older. For every 100 females there were 92.7 males, and for every 100 females age 18 and over there were 90.2 males age 18 and over.

94.8% of residents lived in urban areas, while 5.2% lived in rural areas.

There were 1,538 households in Gallipolis, of which 22.9% had children under the age of 18 living in them. Of all households, 29.1% were married-couple households, 23.5% were households with a male householder and no spouse or partner present, and 38.1% were households with a female householder and no spouse or partner present. About 45.0% of all households were made up of individuals and 22.1% had someone living alone who was 65 years of age or older.

There were 1,816 housing units, of which 15.3% were vacant. The homeowner vacancy rate was 2.9% and the rental vacancy rate was 8.1%.

Racial composition as of the 2020 census
Race	Number	Percent
White	2,893	87.3%
Black or African American	154	4.6%
American Indian and Alaska Native	10	0.3%
Asian	45	1.4%
Native Hawaiian and Other Pacific Islander	0	0.0%
Some other race	35	1.1%
Two or more races	176	5.3%
Hispanic or Latino (of any race)	48	1.4%

=== 2010 census ===
As of the census of 2010, there were 3,641 people, 1,576 households, and 854 families residing in the village. The population density was 1,011.4 inhabitants per square mile (390.5/km^{2}). There were 1,869 housing units at an average density of 519.2 per square mile (200.5/km^{2}). The racial makeup of the village was 89.7% White, 5.1% African American, 0.6% Native American, 1.1% Asian, 0.5% from other races, and 3.0% from two or more races. Hispanic or Latino of any race were 1.2% of the population.

There were 1,576 households, of which 24.0% had children under the age of 18 living with them, 33.9% were married couples living together, 15.0% had a female householder with no husband present, 5.3% had a male householder with no wife present, and 45.8% were non-families. 39.7% of all households were made up of individuals, and 18% had someone living alone who was 65 years of age or older. The average household size was 2.14 and the average family size was 2.81.

The median age in the village was 44.6 years. 18.9% of residents were under the age of 18; 8.1% were between the ages of 18 and 24; 23.6% were from 25 to 44; 28.7% were from 45 to 64; and 20.8% were 65 years of age or older. The gender makeup of the village was 48.3% male and 51.7% female.

=== 2000 census ===
As of the census of 2000, there were 4,180 people, 1,847 households, and 1,004 families residing in the village. The population density was 1,156.2 inhabitants per square mile (446.4/km^{2}). There were 2,056 housing units at an average density of 568.7 per square mile (219.6/km^{2}). The racial makeup of the village was 90.57% White, 6.44% African American, 0.43% Native American, 0.77% Asian, 0.19% from other races, and 1.60% from two or more races. Hispanic or Latino of any race were 0.57% of the population.

There were 1,847 households, out of which 23.2% had children under the age of 18 living with them, 37.8% were married couples living together, 13.6% had a female householder with no husband present, and 45.6% were non-families. 41.2% of all households were made up of individuals, and 19.5% had someone living alone who was 65 years of age or older. The average household size was 2.11 and the average family size was 2.87.

In the village, the population was spread out, with 20.1% under the age of 18, 7.8% from 18 to 24, 25.7% from 25 to 44, 25.2% from 45 to 64, and 21.2% who were 65 years of age or older. The median age was 42 years. For every 100 females, there were 86.3 males. For every 100 females age 18 and over, there were 82.9 males.

The median income for a household in the village was $25,846, and the median income for a family was $36,477. Males had a median income of $30,032 versus $22,473 for females. The per capita income for the village was $16,728. About 13.6% of families and 21.5% of the population were below the poverty line, including 27.3% of those under age 18 and 15.1% of those age 65 or over.

== Economy ==
Gallipolis is the hometown of Bob Evans, founder of Bob Evans Restaurants. The first restaurant was located in nearby Rio Grande, Ohio.

Other major employers in Gallipolis/Gallia County include: American Electric Power (General James M. Gavin Plant), Ohio Valley Electric Company (Kyger Creek Power Plant), Holzer Healthcare System, University of Rio Grande, and Gallipolis City Schools.

== Parks and recreation ==
Gallipolis City Park is located centrally in the city and is the site of original settlement by 18th-century French refugees. Cassius M. Canaday Memorial Playground is in the village's east end. Sports facilities include Memorial Field and Cliffside Golf Club. The waterworks facility on Chestnut Street also has green space and some ballfields. The park is known for "Gallipolis in Lights," a Christmas light display that has received national recognition.

Haskins Memorial Park is contiguous with the golf club. The Elizabeth L. Evans Waterfowl and Bird Sanctuary are adjacent to Memorial Field, which also features a skate park. The Texas Road Wildlife Area is located close by.

The village owns and operates the Pine Street and Mound Hill cemeteries. Mound Hill Park has picnic tables and is adjacent to the cemetery; both have a long view over the Ohio River, the village of Gallipolis, and the opposite shore. At least two persons of the founding French 500 are said to have been buried in Mound Hill cemetery. It was officially established in 1880 but had been used for burials before that.

== Education ==
There are four schools within the village. The public schools in the city limits are Gallia Academy Middle School and Washington Elementary, both of which belong to the Gallipolis City Schools. The public school district also controls Gallia Academy High School, Green Elementary and Rio Grande Elementary, which are located outside the village limits.

The noted scientist Edward Alexander Bouchet, the first African American to earn a doctorate from an American university, served as principal of the village's Lincoln High School from 1908 to 1913. Educator and amateur mycologist Miron Elisha Hard served as principal from 1873 to 1875.

On November 8, 2005, a bond issue was passed, allowing for both the construction of a new high school and the renovation of the three public elementary schools. The new Gallia Academy High School, which was completed in the summer of 2009, is located at 2855 Centenary Road, a few miles outside the village limits.

In addition there is a private school: Ohio Valley Christian School, which includes both elementary and secondary grades.

The village is served by the Dr. Samuel L. Bossard Memorial Library, the county's only public lending library.

== Infrastructure ==
=== Transportation ===
U.S. Route 35 traverses the community, and provides a link to West Virginia across the Ohio River. State routes include Ohio State Route 7, State Route 141, State Route 160, and State Route 588.

The Gallia–Meigs Regional Airport is located two nautical miles (2.3 mi; 3.7 km) northeast of Gallipolis's central business district.

== See also ==
- List of cities and towns along the Ohio River
- Gallipolis Island
