= 2018 United States House of Representatives elections =

House elections for the 116th U.S. Congress

- November 6, 2018

All 435 seats in the United States House of Representatives (Note: In addition, five of the six non-voting delegates in the U.S. House of Representatives were elected.) 218 seats needed for a majority
- Turnout: 50.3% ▼4.4 pp
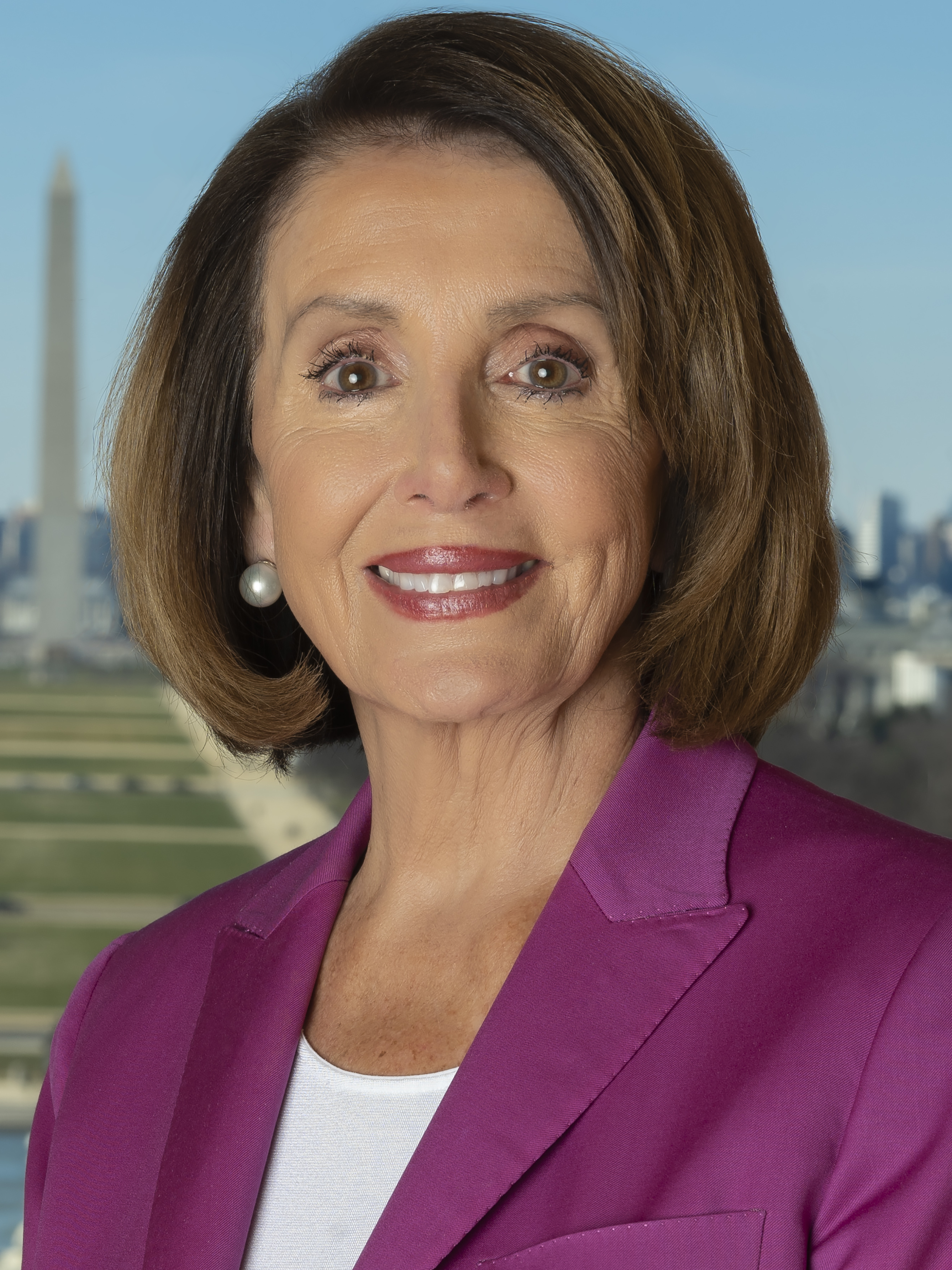

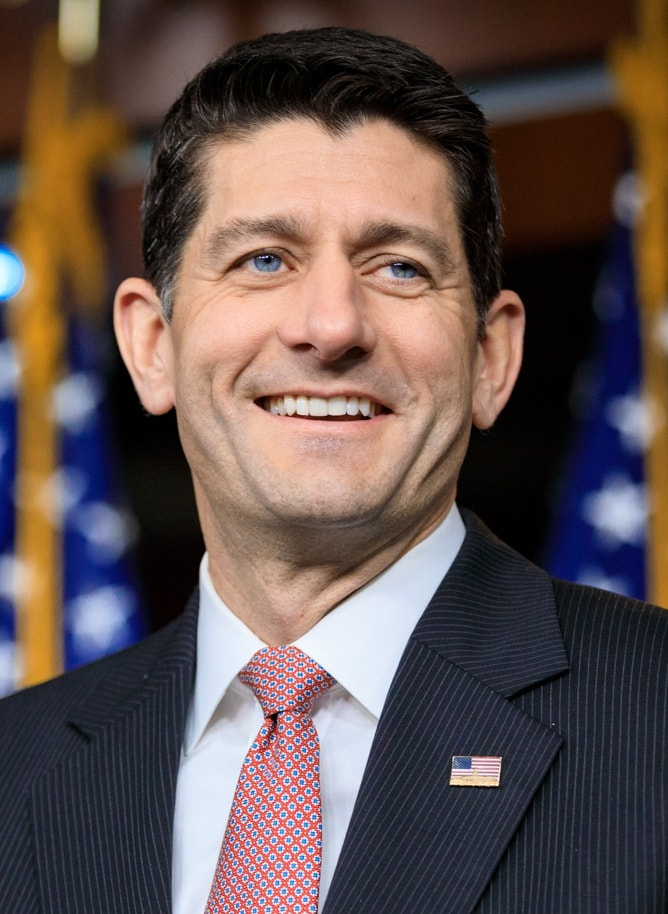
	Majority party	Minority party
Leader	Nancy Pelosi	Paul Ryan (retired)
Party	Democratic	Republican
Leader since	January 3, 2003	October 29, 2015
Leader's seat	California 12th	Wisconsin 1st
Last election	194 seats, 48.0%	241 seats, 49.1%
Seats won	235 (Note: Results from North Carolina's 9th congressional district were voided, leading to a September 2019 special election that was retained by the GOP.)	199
Seat change	▲41 (Note: This figure represents the difference between the number of Democrats seated when the 116th Congress convened in January 2019 (235) and the number of Democrats seated when the 115th Congress convened in January 2017 (194).)	▼42 (Note: This figure represents the difference between the number of Republicans seated when the 116th Congress convened in January 2019 (199) and the number of Republicans seated when the 115th Congress convened in January 2017 (241).)
Popular vote	60,572,245	50,861,970
Percentage	53.4%	44.8%
Swing	▲5.4pp	▼4.3pp
- Results: Democratic hold Democratic gain Republican hold Republican gain Result voided and sent to special election (Note: The 116th Congress has one vacancy in the House of Representatives. For further information, see 2018 North Carolina's 9th congressional district election#Refusal of certification.)
Speaker before election
Paul Ryan
Republican
Elected Speaker
Nancy Pelosi
Democratic

The 2018 United States House of Representatives elections were held on November 6, 2018. The 2018 House elections were midterm elections that occurred during President Donald Trump's first term in office. Early voting took place in some states in the weeks preceding Election Day. Voters chose representatives from all 435 congressional districts across each of the 50 U.S. states to serve in the 116th United States Congress.

Led by House Minority Leader Nancy Pelosi, the Democratic Party won control of the House of Representatives in the 2018 elections. The Democrats gained a net total of 41 seats. Prior to the 2026 elections, the 41-seat gain was the Democrats' largest gain of House seats since the post-Watergate 1974 elections when they picked up 49 seats.

== Results summary and analysis ==
The Democratic Party won control of the House of Representatives in the 2018 midterm elections. The Democrats gained a net total of 41 seats from the total number of seats they had won in the 2016 elections. This was their largest gain of House seats in an election since the 1974 elections, when the Democrats gained 49 House seats. Democrats won the popular vote by 8.6% and more than 9.7 million votes, the largest raw vote margin on record for a minority party.

Prior to the 2018 elections, the Republican Party had held the House majority since January 2011. According to the Associated Press' statistical analysis, gerrymandering may have cost the Democrats 16 seats in the 2018 House elections. Voter turnout in these elections was 50.3%, the highest turnout in a U.S. midterm election since 1914.

The House Republicans' passage of the widely unpopular American Health Care Act of 2017 to repeal the Affordable Care Act, as well as opposition to Trump's policies, his low approval ratings, and questions about his personal stamina for office, are credited for the Democratic takeover of the House.

(Note that the results summary does not include blank and over/under votes which were included in the official results or votes cast in the voided election in North Carolina's 9th congressional district.)

↓
235	199
Democratic	Republican

Parties	Seats				Popular vote		
Parties	2016	2018	+/−	Strength	Vote	%	Change
Democratic Party	194	235	▲41	54.0%	60,319,623	53.4%	+5.4%
Republican Party	241	199	▼42	45.7%	50,467,181	44.8%	–4.3%
Libertarian Party	—	—	—	—	758,492	0.7%	–0.6%
Independent	—	—	—	—	576,660	0.5%	–0.2%
Green Party	—	—	—	—	247,021	0.2%	–0.2%
Constitution Party	—	—	—	—	23,624	0.1%	–
Others	—	—	—	—	1,624,230	0.3%	–0.1%
Totals	435	435	0	100.0%	114,016,831	100.0%	—

=== Partisan shifts by state ===
State	Total seats	Democratic		Republican	
State	Total seats	Seats	Change	Seats	Change
Alabama	7	1	Steady	6	Steady
Alaska	1	0	Steady	1	Steady
Arizona	9	5	▲1	4	▼1
Arkansas	4	0	Steady	4	Steady
California	53	46	▲7	7	▼7
Colorado	7	4	▲1	3	▼1
Connecticut	5	5	Steady	0	Steady
Delaware	1	1	Steady	0	Steady
Florida	27	13	▲2	14	▼2
Georgia	14	5	▲1	9	▼1
Hawaii	2	2	Steady	0	Steady
Idaho	2	0	Steady	2	Steady
Illinois	18	13	▲2	5	▼2
Indiana	9	2	Steady	7	Steady
Iowa	4	3	▲2	1	▼2
Kansas	4	1	▲1	3	▼1
Kentucky	6	1	Steady	5	Steady
Louisiana	6	1	Steady	5	Steady
Maine	2	2	▲1	0	▼1
Maryland	8	7	Steady	1	Steady
Massachusetts	9	9	Steady	0	Steady
Michigan	14	7	▲2	7	▼2
Minnesota	8	5	Steady	3	Steady
Mississippi	4	1	Steady	3	Steady
Missouri	8	2	Steady	6	Steady
Montana	1	0	Steady	1	Steady
Nebraska	3	0	Steady	3	Steady
Nevada	4	3	Steady	1	Steady
New Hampshire	2	2	Steady	0	Steady
New Jersey	12	11	▲4	1	▼4
New Mexico	3	3	▲1	0	▼1
New York	27	21	▲3	6	▼3
North Carolina	13	3	Steady	9	▼1
North Dakota	1	0	Steady	1	Steady
Ohio	16	4	Steady	12	Steady
Oklahoma	5	1	▲1	4	▼1
Oregon	5	4	Steady	1	Steady
Pennsylvania	18	9	▲4	9	▼4
Rhode Island	2	2	Steady	0	Steady
South Carolina	7	2	▲1	5	▼1
South Dakota	1	0	Steady	1	Steady
Tennessee	9	2	Steady	7	Steady
Texas	36	13	▲2	23	▼2
Utah	4	1	▲1	3	▼1
Vermont	1	1	Steady	0	Steady
Virginia	11	7	▲3	4	▼3
Washington	10	7	▲1	3	▼1
West Virginia	3	0	Steady	3	Steady
Wisconsin	8	3	Steady	5	Steady
Wyoming	1	0	Steady	1	Steady
Total	435	235	▲41	199	▼42

Popular vote
Democratic	53.41%
Republican	44.85%
Libertarian	0.67%
Green	0.22%
Other	0.85%

House seats
Democratic	54.0%
Republican	45.7%

=== Maps ===
Cartogram of results
Democratic gain Republican gain
Democratic hold Republican hold
Independent hold Results voided
Not up for election

Popular vote by states

House seats by party holding plurality in state

Net changes to U.S. House seats after the 2018 elections
+1 Dem House seat +2 Dem House seats
+3–4 Dem House seats +7 Dem House seats
Both parties won two seats and lost two seats, no net change.

Results shaded according to winning candidate's share of the vote

=== Veteran candidate recruitment ===
The Democratic Congressional Campaign Committee actively recruited military veterans and candidates with national security backgrounds for competitive districts in 2018. Political analysts noted that candidates with military experience could appeal to moderate and independent voters in swing districts. Of the 24 Republicans unseated by Democrats, eight were defeated by veterans or former national security officials, including Jason Crow (Colorado), Elissa Slotkin (Michigan), Mikie Sherrill (New Jersey), Chrissy Houlahan (Pennsylvania), and Elaine Luria (Virginia).

== Retirements ==
Retiring incumbents by district Democratic incumbent ran Democratic incumbent retired or lost renomination Republican incumbent ran Republican incumbent retired or lost renomination Democratic and Republican incumbent ran Vacant or new district

In the November general elections, 55 incumbents did not seek re-election. This election cycle saw the third most retirements in an election cycle in history behind 1992 and 2026.

=== Democrats ===
Eighteen Democrats did not seek re-election.

1. Arizona 9: Kyrsten Sinema retired to run for the U.S. Senate.
2. Colorado 2: Jared Polis retired to run for governor of Colorado.
3. Connecticut 5: Elizabeth Esty retired after involvement in sexual harassment allegations against an employee.
4. Hawaii 1: Colleen Hanabusa retired to run for governor of Hawaii.
5. Illinois 4: Luis Gutiérrez retired.
6. Maryland 6: John Delaney retired to run for U.S. president.
7. Massachusetts 3: Niki Tsongas retired.
8. Michigan 9: Sander Levin retired.
9. Minnesota 1: Tim Walz retired to run for governor of Minnesota.
10. Minnesota 5: Keith Ellison retired to run for Minnesota attorney general.
11. Minnesota 8: Rick Nolan retired to run for lieutenant governor of Minnesota.
12. Nevada 3: Jacky Rosen retired to run for the U.S. Senate.
13. Nevada 4: Rubén Kihuen retired due to sexual harassment allegations.
14. New Hampshire 1: Carol Shea-Porter retired.
15. New Mexico 1: Michelle Lujan Grisham retired to run for governor of New Mexico.
16. Pennsylvania 2: Bob Brady retired after being redistricted from the 1st district.
17. Texas 16: Beto O'Rourke retired to run for the U.S. Senate.
18. Texas 29: Gene Green retired.

=== Republicans ===
Thirty-seven Republicans did not seek re-election.

1. Arizona 2: Martha McSally retired to run for the U.S. Senate.
2. California 39: Ed Royce retired.
3. California 49: Darrell Issa retired, nominated by President Donald Trump to be the director of the United States Trade and Development Agency.
4. Florida 6: Ron DeSantis announced his retirement to run for governor of Florida, then resigned on September 10, 2018.
5. Florida 15: Dennis Ross retired.
6. Florida 17: Tom Rooney retired.
7. Florida 27: Ileana Ros-Lehtinen retired.
8. Idaho 1: Raúl Labrador retired to run for governor of Idaho.
9. Indiana 4: Todd Rokita retired to run for the U.S. Senate.
10. Indiana 6: Luke Messer retired to run for the U.S. Senate.
11. Kansas 2: Lynn Jenkins retired.
12. Michigan 11: Dave Trott retired.
13. Mississippi 3: Gregg Harper retired.
14. New Jersey 2: Frank LoBiondo retired "due to the increased political polarization of Congress."
15. New Jersey 11: Rodney Frelinghuysen retired.
16. New Mexico 2: Steve Pearce retired to run for governor of New Mexico.
17. North Dakota at-large: Kevin Cramer retired to run for the U.S. Senate.
18. Ohio 16: Jim Renacci retired to run for the U.S. Senate.
19. Oklahoma 1: Jim Bridenstine announced his retirement November 10, 2017. He resigned April 23, 2018, after being confirmed as administrator of NASA; his replacement was seated November 6, 2018.
20. Pennsylvania 6: Ryan Costello retired due to "family, the political environment and redistricting."
21. Pennsylvania 9: Lou Barletta, redistricted from the 11th district, retired to run for U.S. senator.
22. Pennsylvania 13: Bill Shuster retired when redistricted from the 9th district.
23. South Carolina 4: Trey Gowdy retired to "return to the justice system."
24. South Dakota at-large: Kristi Noem retired to run for governor of South Dakota.
25. Tennessee 2: Jimmy Duncan retired.
26. Tennessee 6: Diane Black retired to run for governor of Tennessee.
27. Tennessee 7: Marsha Blackburn retired to run for the U.S. Senate.
28. Texas 2: Ted Poe retired.
29. Texas 3: Sam Johnson retired.
30. Texas 5: Jeb Hensarling retired.
31. Texas 6: Joe Barton retired.
32. Texas 21: Lamar Smith retired.
33. Virginia 5: Tom Garrett retired due to alcoholism.
34. Virginia 6: Bob Goodlatte retired.
35. Washington 8: Dave Reichert retired.
36. West Virginia 3: Evan Jenkins announced his retirement to run for the U.S. Senate, then resigned on September 30, 2018, to become a justice of the Supreme Court of Appeals of West Virginia.
37. Wisconsin 1: Paul Ryan retired.

== Incumbents defeated ==
=== In primary elections ===
==== Democrats ====
Three Democrats (including one non-voting delegate) lost renomination.

1. Guam at-large: Delegate Madeleine Bordallo lost renomination to Michael San Nicolas, who went on to win the general election.
2. Massachusetts 7: Mike Capuano lost renomination to Ayanna Pressley, who went on to win the general election.
3. New York 14: Joe Crowley lost renomination to Alexandria Ocasio-Cortez, who went on to win the general election.

==== Republicans ====
Two Republicans lost renomination.

1. North Carolina 9: Robert Pittenger lost renomination to Mark Harris. A new special election was ordered due to electoral fraud conducted by associates of Republican Harris's campaign.
2. South Carolina 1: Mark Sanford lost renomination to Katie Arrington, who lost the general election to Joe Cunningham (D).

=== In the general election ===
==== Democrats ====
No Democrats lost re-election to Republicans.

==== Republicans ====
Thirty Republicans lost re-election to Democrats.

1. California 10: Jeff Denham (first elected in 2010) lost to Josh Harder.
2. California 21: David Valadao (first elected in 2012) lost to TJ Cox.
3. California 25: Steve Knight (first elected in 2014) lost to Katie Hill.
4. California 45: Mimi Walters (first elected in 2014) lost to Katie Porter.
5. California 48: Dana Rohrabacher (first elected in 1988) lost to Harley Rouda.
6. Colorado 6: Mike Coffman (first elected in 2008) lost to Jason Crow.
7. Florida 26: Carlos Curbelo (first elected in 2014) lost to Debbie Mucarsel-Powell.
8. Georgia 6: Karen Handel (first elected in 2017) lost to Lucy McBath.
9. Illinois 6: Peter Roskam (first elected in 2006) lost to Sean Casten.
10. Illinois 14: Randy Hultgren (first elected in 2010) lost to Lauren Underwood.
11. Iowa 1: Rod Blum (first elected in 2014) lost to Abby Finkenauer.
12. Iowa 3: David Young (first elected in 2014) lost to Cindy Axne.
13. Kansas 3: Kevin Yoder (first elected in 2010) lost to Sharice Davids.
14. Maine 2: Bruce Poliquin (first elected in 2014) lost to Jared Golden.
15. Michigan 8: Mike Bishop (first elected in 2014) lost to Elissa Slotkin.
16. Minnesota 2: Jason Lewis (first elected in 2016) lost to Angie Craig.
17. Minnesota 3: Erik Paulsen (first elected in 2008) lost to Dean Phillips.
18. New Jersey 3: Tom MacArthur (first elected in 2014) lost to Andy Kim.
19. New Jersey 7: Leonard Lance (first elected in 2008) lost to Tom Malinowski.
20. New York 11: Dan Donovan (first elected in 2015) lost to Max Rose.
21. New York 19: John Faso (first elected in 2016) lost to Antonio Delgado.
22. New York 22: Claudia Tenney (first elected in 2016) lost to Anthony Brindisi.
23. Oklahoma 5: Steve Russell (first elected in 2014) lost to Kendra Horn.
24. Pennsylvania 17: Keith Rothfus (first elected in 2012) lost a redistricting race to Conor Lamb.
25. Texas 7: John Culberson (first elected in 2000) lost to Lizzie Fletcher.
26. Texas 32: Pete Sessions (first elected in 1996) lost to Colin Allred.
27. Utah 4: Mia Love (first elected in 2014) lost to Ben McAdams.
28. Virginia 2: Scott Taylor (first elected in 2016) lost to Elaine Luria.
29. Virginia 7: Dave Brat (first elected in 2014) lost to Abigail Spanberger.
30. Virginia 10: Barbara Comstock (first elected in 2014) lost to Jennifer Wexton.

== Open seats that changed parties ==
=== Democratic seats won by Republicans ===
Three open Democratic seats were won by Republicans.

1. Minnesota 1: won by Jim Hagedorn.
2. Minnesota 8: won by Pete Stauber.
3. Pennsylvania 14: Conor Lamb instead ran in the 17th district; won by Guy Reschenthaler.

=== Republican seats won by Democrats ===
Thirteen open Republican seats were won by Democrats.

1. Arizona 2: won by Ann Kirkpatrick.
2. California 39: won by Gil Cisneros.
3. California 49: won by Mike Levin.
4. Florida 27: won by Donna Shalala.
5. Michigan 11: won by Haley Stevens.
6. New Jersey 2: won by Jeff Van Drew, who later became a Republican on December 19, 2019.
7. New Jersey 11: won by Mikie Sherrill.
8. New Mexico 2: won by Xochitl Torres Small.
9. Pennsylvania 5: won by Mary Gay Scanlon.
10. Pennsylvania 6: won by Chrissy Houlahan.
11. Pennsylvania 7: won by Susan Wild.
12. South Carolina 1: won by Joe Cunningham.
13. Washington 8: won by Kim Schrier.

== Vacancies during the 115th Congress that did not result in special elections ==
Three Republicans, all of whom had already announced their retirement, resigned early.

1. Florida 6: Ron DeSantis resigned on September 10, 2018, retroactive to September 1, to focus on his campaign for Governor of Florida. This seat was then left vacant until the 116th Congress was sworn in on January 3, 2019.
2. Oklahoma 1: Jim Bridenstine resigned on April 23, 2018, to become head of NASA. This seat was then left vacant until Kevin Hern was sworn in early on November 13, 2018, having won the regularly scheduled November 6, 2018 election for the next full term.
3. West Virginia 3: Evan Jenkins announced his retirement May 8, 2017, to run for U.S. Senator. He lost the nomination and then resigned September 30, 2018, when appointed to the Supreme Court of Appeals of West Virginia. This seat was then left vacant until the 116th Congress was sworn in on January 3, 2019.

== Closest races ==
Eighty-nine races were decided by 10% or lower.

District	Winner	Margin
Georgia 7th	Republican	0.15%
Utah 4th	Democratic (flip)	0.26%
North Carolina 9th	Republican	0.32%
New York 27th	Republican	0.38%
Texas 23rd	Republican	0.43%
Minnesota 1st	Republican (flip)	0.45%
California 21st	Democratic (flip)	0.74%
Illinois 13th	Republican	0.76%
Kansas 2nd	Republican	0.85%
Georgia 6th	Democratic (flip)	1.03%
Maine 2nd	Democratic (flip)	1.24%
New Jersey 3rd	Democratic (flip)	1.29%
South Carolina 1st	Democratic (flip)	1.39%
Oklahoma 5th	Democratic (flip)	1.40%
Florida 26th	Democratic (flip)	1.75%
New York 22nd	Democratic (flip)	1.78%
New Mexico 2nd	Democratic (flip)	1.87%
Virginia 7th	Democratic (flip)	1.94%
Nebraska 2nd	Republican	1.99%
Iowa 3rd	Democratic (flip)	2.16%
Virginia 2nd	Democratic (flip)	2.24%
Pennsylvania 1st	Republican	2.52%
Pennsylvania 10th	Republican	2.64%
Texas 21st	Republican	2.82%
Texas 31st	Republican	3.00%
California 39th	Democratic (flip)	3.11%
Texas 24th	Republican	3.21%
Kentucky 6th	Republican	3.21%
Iowa 4th	Republican	3.33%
California 50th	Republican	3.48%
Michigan 8th	Democratic (flip)	3.83%
Missouri 2nd	Republican	3.95%
New York 1st	Republican	4.09%
California 45th	Democratic (flip)	4.10%
Ohio 12th	Republican	4.16%
Minnesota 7th	Democratic	4.26%
Texas 10th	Republican	4.27%
Pennsylvania 16th	Republican	4.28%
California 10th	Democratic (flip)	4.49% (Note: This seat was the tipping point seat for a Democratic majority.)
Michigan 6th	Republican	4.55%
Montana at-large	Republican	4.63%
Washington 8th	Democratic (flip)	4.83%
Texas 22nd	Republican	4.98%
Illinois 14th	Democratic (flip)	5.00%
New Jersey 7th	Democratic (flip)	5.02%
Iowa 1st	Democratic (flip)	5.06%
Texas 7th	Democratic (flip)	5.06%
New York 19th	Democratic (flip)	5.21%
New York 24th	Republican	5.26%
Ohio 1st	Republican	5.36%
California 22nd	Republican	5.44%
North Carolina 2nd	Republican	5.45%
Minnesota 2nd	Democratic (flip)	5.50%
Minnesota 8th	Republican (flip)	5.54%
Washington 3rd	Republican	5.66%
North Carolina 13th	Republican	6.00%
Florida 27th	Democratic (flip)	6.00%
Florida 15th	Republican	6.04%
Illinois 12th	Republican	6.18%
New York 2nd	Republican	6.22%
Arkansas 2nd	Republican	6.31%
New York 11th	Democratic (flip)	6.45%
Texas 32nd	Democratic (flip)	6.50%
Virginia 5th	Republican	6.53%
Alaska at-large	Republican	6.58%
Michigan 11th	Democratic (flip)	6.67%
California 48th	Democratic (flip)	7.10%
Illinois 6th	Democratic (flip)	7.15%
Texas 2nd	Republican	7.29%
Michigan 7th	Republican	7.61%
Texas 6th	Republican	7.66%
New Jersey 2nd	Democratic (flip)	7.67%
Arizona 1st	Democratic	7.69%
Colorado 3rd	Republican	7.97%
Nevada 4th	Democratic	8.18%
California 4th	Republican	8.26%
New York 23rd	Republican	8.49%
New Hampshire 1st	Democratic	8.55%
Florida 18th	Republican	8.60%
California 25th	Democratic (flip)	8.73%
Texas 25th	Republican	8.75%
Nevada 3rd	Democratic	9.06%
Florida 16th	Republican	9.12%
Pennsylvania 8th	Democratic	9.29%
Arizona 2nd	Democratic (flip)	9.49%
Kansas 3rd	Democratic (flip)	9.66%
Indiana 2nd	Republican	9.67%
California 1st	Republican	9.77%
Washington 5th	Republican	9.86%

== Special elections ==
Elections ordered by election date.

District	Incumbent			This race	
District	Member	Party	First elected	Results	Candidates
Pennsylvania 18	Tim Murphy	Republican	2002	Incumbent resigned October 21, 2017. New member elected March 13, 2018. Democratic gain.	▌ ✓ Conor Lamb (Democratic) 49.9%; ▌Rick Saccone (Republican) 49.5%
Arizona 8	Trent Franks	Republican	2002	Incumbent resigned December 8, 2017. New member elected April 24, 2018. Republican hold.	▌ ✓ Debbie Lesko (Republican) 52.4%; ▌Hiral Tipirneni (Democratic) 47.6%
Texas 27	Blake Farenthold	Republican	2010	Incumbent resigned April 6, 2018. New member elected June 30, 2018. Republican hold.	▌ ✓ Michael Cloud (Republican) 54.7%; ▌Eric Holguin (Democratic) 32.0%; ▌Roy Barrera (Democratic) 4.8%; ▌Bech Bruun (Republican) 4.3%; ▌Mike Westergren (Democratic) 2.4%
Ohio 12	Pat Tiberi	Republican	2000	Incumbent resigned January 15, 2018. New member elected August 7, 2018. Republican hold.	▌ ✓ Troy Balderson (Republican) 50.1%; ▌Danny O'Connor (Democratic) 49.3%
Michigan 13	John Conyers	Democratic	1964	Incumbent resigned December 5, 2017. New member elected November 6, 2018. Democratic hold.	▌ ✓ Brenda Jones (Democratic) 86.9%; ▌Marc Sosnowski (Taxpayers) 8.9%; ▌D. Etta Wilcoxon (Green) 4.3%
New York 25	Louise Slaughter	Democratic	1986	Incumbent died March 16, 2018. New member elected November 6, 2018. Democratic hold.	▌ ✓ Joseph Morelle (Democratic) 58.3%; ▌Jim Maxwell (Republican) 41.7%
Pennsylvania 7	Pat Meehan	Republican	2010	Incumbent resigned April 27, 2018. New member elected November 6, 2018. Democratic gain.	▌ ✓ Mary Gay Scanlon (Democratic) 52.3%; ▌Pearl Kim (Republican) 46.0%; ▌Sandra Teresa Salas (Libertarian) 1.0%
Pennsylvania 15	Charlie Dent	Republican	2004	Incumbent resigned May 12, 2018. New member elected November 6, 2018. Democratic gain.	▌ ✓ Susan Wild (Democratic) 48.5%; ▌Marty Nothstein (Republican) 48.3%; ▌Tim Silfies (Libertarian) 3.2%

== Exit poll ==
Response category	DEM	GOP	% of total vote
Total vote	53	45	100
Ideology
Liberals	91	8	27
Moderates	62	36	37
Conservatives	16	83	36
Party
Democrats	95	4	37
Republicans	6	94	33
Independents	54	42	30
Party by gender
Democratic men	94	5	14
Democratic women	96	3	23
Republican men	6	94	17
Republican women	6	93	16
Independent men	51	44	16
Independent women	57	39	13
Gender
Men	47	51	48
Women	59	40	52
Marital status
Married	51	48	59
Unmarried	61	37	41
Gender by marital status
Married men	48	51	30
Married women	55	44	29
Non-married men	54	44	18
Non-married women	66	32	23
Race/ethnicity
White	44	54	72
Black	90	9	11
Asian	77	23	3
Other	54	42	3
Hispanic (of any race)	69	29	11
Gender by race/ethnicity
White men	39	60	35
White women	49	49	37
Black men	88	12	5
Black women	92	7	6
Latino men (of any race)	63	34	5
Latino women (of any race)	73	26	6
All other races	66	32	6
Religion
Protestant/Other Christian	42	56	47
Catholic	50	49	26
Jewish	81	17	2
Other religion	73	25	8
None	70	28	17
Religious service attendance
Weekly or more	40	58	32
A few times a month	52	46	13
A few times a year	61	37	27
Never	68	30	27
White evangelical or born-again Christian
White evangelical or born-again Christian	22	75	26
Everyone else	66	32	74
Age
18–24 years old	68	31	7
25–29 years old	66	33	6
30–39 years old	59	38	15
40–49 years old	52	46	16
50–64 years old	49	50	30
65 and older	48	50	26
Age by race
Whites 18–29 years old	56	43	8
Whites 30–44 years old	48	48	15
Whites 45–64 years old	40	59	29
Whites 65 and older	43	56	22
Blacks 18–29 years old	92	7	2
Blacks 30–44 years old	92	7	3
Blacks 45–64 years old	88	11	5
Blacks 65 and older	88	11	2
Latinos 18–29 years old	81	17	2
Latinos 30–44 years old	74	25	2
Latinos 45–64 years old	63	35	3
Latinos 65 and older	71	25	2
Others	65	33	6
LGBT
Yes	82	17	6
No	51	47	94
Education
High school graduate/dropout	48	51	23
Some college education	52	47	25
Associate degree	47	50	11
Bachelor's degree	55	43	24
Postgraduate education	65	34	17
Education by race/ethnicity
White college graduates	53	45	31
White no college degree	37	61	41
Non-white college graduates	77	22	10
Non-white no college degree	76	22	18
Whites by education and gender
White women with college degrees	59	39	16
White men with college degrees	47	51	15
White women without college degrees	42	56	21
White men without college degrees	32	66	20
Non-whites	76	22	28
Family income
Under $30,000	63	34	17
$30,000–49,999	57	41	21
$50,000–99,999	52	47	29
$100,000–199,999	47	51	25
Over $200,000	47	52	9
Military service
Veterans	41	58	14
Non-veterans	56	43	86
Community size
Urban	66	33	32
Suburban	49	49	51
Rural	42	56	17
Trump approval rating
Strongly disapprove	95	4	46
Somewhat disapprove	63	34	8
Somewhat approve	24	74	14
Strongly approve	5	94	31
Decided on U.S. House vote
Last few days	53	41	8
Last week	49	48	8
Last month	51	46	19
Earlier than that	52	47	63
Direction of the country
Wrong track	85	13	54
Right direction	13	86	42
Do you think Americans are politically
Becoming more divided	60	39	76
Staying about the same	32	66	9
Becoming more united	28	70	9
Issue regarded as most important
Health care	75	23	41
Immigration	23	75	23
Economy	34	63	22
Gun policy	70	29	10
Health care in the U.S. needs
Major changes	55	43	69
Minor changes	41	57	24
No changes	40	60	4
Who would better protect pre-existing conditions
Democrats	89	9	57
Republicans	4	94	35
Are Donald Trump's immigration policies
Too tough	90	8	46
About right	13	85	33
Not tough enough	14	86	17
Condition of the nation's economy
Excellent	12	87	17
Good	47	51	51
Not so good	83	15	23
Poor	85	8	7
Family's financial situation today
Better than two years ago	21	77	36
About the same	69	29	49
Worse than two years ago	80	18	14
Effect of Trump's trade policies on local economy
Helped	9	91	25
Hurt	89	8	29
Had no impact	53	45	37
Effect of new tax laws on your personal finances
Helped	15	84	29
Hurt	83	15	22
Had no impact	62	36	45
Does anyone in household own a gun
Yes	36	61	46
No	72	26	53
Views on stricter gun control measures
Support	76	22	59
Oppose	22	76	37
View of the Russia investigation
Politically motivated	25	73	54
Mostly justified	85	14	41
View of Mueller's handling of Russia investigation
Approve	79	19	41
Disapprove	28	71	46
Has the government done enough to protect the election
Yes	27	71	38
No	75	24	50
Does Trump's foreign policy make the U.S.
Safer	8	91	38
Less safe	90	9	46
No difference	60	38	13
View of Kavanaugh's Supreme Court appointment
Support	12	87	43
Oppose	90	9	47
How should the Supreme Court handle Roe v. Wade
Keep as is	69	30	66
Overturn it	21	79	25
Sexual harassment in this country today is
A very serious problem	72	26	46
Somewhat serious problem	48	50	38
Not too serious a problem	20	79	11
Not a serious problem	N/A	N/A	3
In the U.S. today
Whites are favored	87	9	41
Minorities are favored	12	85	19
No group is favored	29	69	33
In your vote today, was recent extremist violence
The most important factor	62	37	23
An important factor	51	48	51
A minor factor	38	60	9
Not a factor at all	36	61	9
Importance of electing racial/ethnic minorities
Very important	79	20	43
Somewhat important	44	55	29
Not too important	20	79	10
Not at all important	12	84	18
Importance of electing more women to public office
Very important	82	17	45
Somewhat important	45	52	33
Not too important	17	80	12
Not at all important	8	90	8
The greater concern is that some people will
Be prevented from voting	80	18	53
Cast illegitimate votes	21	78	36

Source: Edison Research exit poll for the National Election Pool

== Election dates ==
For the regularly scheduled November elections.

State/territory	Filing deadline	Primary election	Primary runoff (if necessary)	General election	Poll closing (Eastern Time)
Alabama	February 9, 2018	June 5, 2018	July 17, 2018	November 6, 2018	8pm
Alaska	June 1, 2018	August 21, 2018	N/A	November 6, 2018	Midnight & 1am
American Samoa	September 1, 2018	N/A	N/A	November 6, 2018	12am
Arizona	May 30, 2018	August 28, 2018	N/A	November 6, 2018	9pm
Arkansas	March 1, 2018	May 22, 2018	June 19, 2018 (Note: All races were decided on the initial primary date, eliminating the need for a runoff.)	November 6, 2018	8:30pm
California	March 9, 2018	June 5, 2018	N/A	November 6, 2018	11pm
Colorado	March 20, 2018	June 26, 2018	N/A	November 6, 2018	9pm
Connecticut	June 12, 2018	August 14, 2018	N/A	November 6, 2018	8pm
Delaware	July 10, 2018	September 6, 2018	N/A	November 6, 2018	8pm
District of Columbia	March 21, 2018	June 19, 2018	N/A	November 6, 2018	8pm
Florida	May 4, 2018	August 28, 2018	N/A	November 6, 2018	7pm & 8pm
Georgia	March 9, 2018	May 22, 2018	July 24, 2018	November 6, 2018	7pm
Guam	June 26, 2018	August 25, 2018	N/A	November 6, 2018	5am
Hawaii	June 5, 2018	August 11, 2018	N/A	November 6, 2018	11pm
Idaho	March 9, 2018	May 15, 2018	N/A	November 6, 2018	10pm & 11pm
Illinois	December 4, 2017	March 20, 2018	N/A	November 6, 2018	8pm
Indiana	February 9, 2018	May 8, 2018	N/A	November 6, 2018	6pm & 7pm
Iowa	March 16, 2018	June 5, 2018	N/A	November 6, 2018	10pm
Kansas	June 1, 2018	August 7, 2018	N/A	November 6, 2018	8pm & 9pm
Kentucky	January 30, 2018	May 22, 2018	N/A	November 6, 2018	6pm & 7pm
Louisiana	July 20, 2018	November 6, 2018	N/A	December 8, 2018 (Note: Louisiana will hold runoff election(s) on December 8, 2018, for any race in which no one candidate wins a majority of the vote in the November jungle primary.)	9pm
Maine	March 15, 2018	June 12, 2018	N/A	November 6, 2018	8pm
Maryland	February 27, 2018	June 26, 2018	N/A	November 6, 2018	8pm
Massachusetts	June 5, 2018	September 4, 2018	N/A	November 6, 2018	8pm
Michigan	April 24, 2018	August 7, 2018	N/A	November 6, 2018	8pm & 9pm
Minnesota	June 5, 2018	August 14, 2018	N/A	November 6, 2018	9pm
Mississippi	March 1, 2018	June 5, 2018	June 26, 2018	November 6, 2018	8pm
Missouri	March 27, 2018	August 7, 2018	N/A	November 6, 2018	8pm
Montana	March 12, 2018	June 5, 2018	N/A	November 6, 2018	10pm
Nebraska	March 1, 2018	May 15, 2018	N/A	November 6, 2018	9pm
Nevada	March 16, 2018	June 12, 2018	N/A	November 6, 2018	10pm
New Hampshire	June 15, 2018	September 11, 2018	N/A	November 6, 2018	8pm
New Jersey	April 2, 2018	June 5, 2018	N/A	November 6, 2018	8pm
New Mexico	March 13, 2018	June 5, 2018	N/A	November 6, 2018	9pm
New York	April 12, 2018	June 26, 2018	N/A	November 6, 2018	9pm
North Carolina	February 28, 2018	May 8, 2018	July 17, 2018	November 6, 2018	7:30pm
North Dakota	April 9, 2018	June 12, 2018	N/A	November 6, 2018	10pm & 11pm
Northern Mariana Islands	August 8, 2018	N/A	N/A	November 13, 2018	4am
Ohio	February 7, 2018	May 8, 2018	N/A	November 6, 2018	7:30pm
Oklahoma	April 13, 2018	June 26, 2018	August 28, 2018	November 6, 2018	8pm
Oregon	March 6, 2018	May 15, 2018	N/A	November 6, 2018	10pm & 11pm
Pennsylvania	March 20, 2018	May 15, 2018	N/A	November 6, 2018	8pm
Rhode Island	June 27, 2018	September 12, 2018	N/A	November 6, 2018	8pm
South Carolina	March 30, 2018	June 12, 2018	June 26, 2018	November 6, 2018	7pm
South Dakota	March 27, 2018	June 5, 2018	August 14, 2018	November 6, 2018	8pm & 9pm
Tennessee	April 5, 2018	August 2, 2018	N/A	November 6, 2018	8pm
Texas	December 11, 2017	March 6, 2018	May 22, 2018	November 6, 2018	8pm & 9pm
United States Virgin Islands	May 8, 2018	August 4, 2018	N/A	November 6, 2018	6pm
Utah	March 15, 2018	June 26, 2018	N/A	November 6, 2018	10pm
Vermont	May 31, 2018	August 14, 2018	N/A	November 6, 2018	7pm
Virginia	March 29, 2018	June 12, 2018	N/A	November 6, 2018	7pm
Washington	May 18, 2018	August 7, 2018	N/A	November 6, 2018	11pm
West Virginia	January 27, 2018	May 8, 2018	N/A	November 6, 2018	7:30pm
Wisconsin	June 1, 2018	August 14, 2018	N/A	November 6, 2018	9pm
Wyoming	June 1, 2018	August 21, 2018	N/A	November 6, 2018	9pm

== Alabama ==
The state congressional delegation remained the same, at 6–1 for Republicans.

District		Incumbent			Results	Candidates
Location	2017 PVI	Representative	Party	First elected	Results	Candidates
Alabama 1	R+15	Bradley Byrne	Republican	2013 (special)	Incumbent re-elected.	▌ ✓ Bradley Byrne (Republican) 63.2%; ▌Robert Kennedy Jr. (Democratic) 36.8%
Alabama 2	R+16	Martha Roby	Republican	2010	Incumbent re-elected.	▌ ✓ Martha Roby (Republican) 61.5%; ▌Tabitha Isner (Democratic) 38.5%
Alabama 3	R+16	Mike D. Rogers	Republican	2002	Incumbent re-elected.	▌ ✓ Mike D. Rogers (Republican) 63.8%; ▌Mallory Hagan (Democratic) 36.2%
Alabama 4	R+30	Robert Aderholt	Republican	1996	Incumbent re-elected.	▌ ✓ Robert Aderholt (Republican) 79.9%; ▌Lee Auman (Democratic) 20.1%
Alabama 5	R+18	Mo Brooks	Republican	2010	Incumbent re-elected.	▌ ✓ Mo Brooks (Republican) 61.1%; ▌Peter Joffrion (Democratic) 38.9%
Alabama 6	R+26	Gary Palmer	Republican	2014	Incumbent re-elected.	▌ ✓ Gary Palmer (Republican) 69.2%; ▌Danner Kline (Democratic) 30.8%
Alabama 7	D+20	Terri Sewell	Democratic	2010	Incumbent re-elected.	▌ ✓ Terri Sewell (Democratic); Unopposed

== Alaska ==
Republicans maintained control of the sole seat in the state.

District		Incumbent			Results	Candidates
Location	2017 PVI	Representative	Party	First elected	Results	Candidates
Alaska at-large	R+9	Don Young	Republican	1973 (special)	Incumbent re-elected.	▌ ✓ Don Young (Republican) 53.3%; ▌Alyse Galvin (Undeclared/Democratic) 46.7% (Note: Galvin won the Democratic nomination as an "Undeclared" candidate. She would be listed on the ballot as "Undeclared" and the nominee of the Democratic Party.)

== Arizona ==
The state congressional delegation flipped from a 5–4 Republican majority to a 5–4 Democratic majority.

District		Incumbent			Results	Candidates
Location	2017 PVI	Representative	Party	First elected	Results	Candidates
Arizona 1	R+2	Tom O'Halleran	Democratic	2016	Incumbent re-elected.	▌ ✓ Tom O'Halleran (Democratic) 53.8%; ▌Wendy Rogers (Republican) 46.2%
Arizona 2	R+1	Martha McSally	Republican	2014	Incumbent retired to run for U.S. Senator. Democratic gain.	▌ ✓ Ann Kirkpatrick (Democratic) 54.7%; ▌Lea Marquez Peterson (Republican) 45.3%
Arizona 3	D+13	Raúl Grijalva	Democratic	2002	Incumbent re-elected.	▌ ✓ Raúl Grijalva (Democratic) 63.9%; ▌Nick Pierson (Republican) 36.1%
Arizona 4	R+21	Paul Gosar	Republican	2010	Incumbent re-elected.	▌ ✓ Paul Gosar (Republican) 68.2%; ▌David Brill (Democratic) 30.5%; ▌Haryaksha Gregor Knauer (Green) 1.3%
Arizona 5	R+15	Andy Biggs	Republican	2016	Incumbent re-elected.	▌ ✓ Andy Biggs (Republican) 59.4%; ▌Joan Greene (Democratic) 40.6%
Arizona 6	R+9	David Schweikert	Republican	2010	Incumbent re-elected.	▌ ✓ David Schweikert (Republican) 55.2%; ▌Anita Malik (Democratic) 44.8%
Arizona 7	D+23	Ruben Gallego	Democratic	2014	Incumbent re-elected.	▌ ✓ Ruben Gallego (Democratic) 85.8%; ▌Gary Swing (Green) 14.2%
Arizona 8	R+13	Debbie Lesko	Republican	2018 (special)	Incumbent re-elected.	▌ ✓ Debbie Lesko (Republican) 55.5%; ▌Hiral Tipirneni (Democratic) 44.5%
Arizona 9	D+4	Kyrsten Sinema	Democratic	2012	Incumbent retired to run for U.S. Senator. Democratic hold.	▌ ✓ Greg Stanton (Democratic) 61.1%; ▌Steve Ferrara (Republican) 38.9%

== Arkansas ==
The state congressional delegation remained the same with a 4–0 Republican majority.

District		Incumbent			Results	Candidates
Location	2017 PVI	Representative	Party	First elected	Results	Candidates
Arkansas 1	R+17	Rick Crawford	Republican	2010	Incumbent re-elected.	▌ ✓ Rick Crawford (Republican) 68.9%; ▌Chintan Desai (Democratic) 28.8%; ▌Elvis Presley (Libertarian) 2.3%
Arkansas 2	R+7	French Hill	Republican	2014	Incumbent re-elected.	▌ ✓ French Hill (Republican) 52.1%; ▌Clarke Tucker (Democratic) 45.8%; ▌Joe Ryne Swafford (Libertarian) 2.0%
Arkansas 3	R+19	Steve Womack	Republican	2010	Incumbent re-elected.	▌ ✓ Steve Womack (Republican) 64.8%; ▌Josh Mahony (Democratic) 32.6%; ▌Michael Kalagias (Libertarian) 2.6%
Arkansas 4	R+17	Bruce Westerman	Republican	2014	Incumbent re-elected.	▌ ✓ Bruce Westerman (Republican) 66.8%; ▌Hayden Shamel (Democratic) 31.3%; ▌Tom Canada (Libertarian) 1.9%

== California ==
The Democratic majority increased from 39–14 to 46–7.

District		Incumbent			Results	Candidates
Location	2017 PVI	Representative	Party	First elected	Results	Candidates
California 1	R+11	Doug LaMalfa	Republican	2012	Incumbent re-elected.	▌ ✓ Doug LaMalfa (Republican) 54.9%; ▌Audrey Denney (Democratic) 45.1%
California 2	D+22	Jared Huffman	Democratic	2012	Incumbent re-elected.	▌ ✓ Jared Huffman (Democratic) 77.0%; ▌Dale Mensing (Republican) 23.0%
California 3	D+5	John Garamendi	Democratic	2009 (special)	Incumbent re-elected.	▌ ✓ John Garamendi (Democratic) 58.1%; ▌Charlie Schaupp (Republican) 41.9%
California 4	R+10	Tom McClintock	Republican	2008	Incumbent re-elected.	▌ ✓ Tom McClintock (Republican) 54.1%; ▌Jessica Morse (Democratic) 45.9%
California 5	D+21	Mike Thompson	Democratic	1998	Incumbent re-elected.	▌ ✓ Mike Thompson (Democratic) 78.9%; ▌Anthony Mills (Independent) 21.1%
California 6	D+21	Doris Matsui	Democratic	2005 (special)	Incumbent re-elected.	▌ ✓ Doris Matsui (Democratic) 80.4%; ▌Jrmar Jefferson (Democratic) 19.6%
California 7	D+3	Ami Bera	Democratic	2012	Incumbent re-elected.	▌ ✓ Ami Bera (Democratic) 55.0%; ▌Andrew Grant (Republican) 45.0%
California 8	R+9	Paul Cook	Republican	2012	Incumbent re-elected.	▌ ✓ Paul Cook (Republican) 60.0%; ▌Tim Donnelly (Republican) 40.0%
California 9	D+8	Jerry McNerney	Democratic	2006	Incumbent re-elected.	▌ ✓ Jerry McNerney (Democratic) 56.5%; ▌Marla Livengood (Republican) 43.5%
California 10	Even	Jeff Denham	Republican	2010	Incumbent lost re-election. New member elected. Democratic gain.	▌ ✓ Josh Harder (Democratic) 52.3%; ▌Jeff Denham (Republican) 47.7%
California 11	D+21	Mark DeSaulnier	Democratic	2014	Incumbent re-elected.	▌ ✓ Mark DeSaulnier (Democratic) 74.1%; ▌John Fitzgerald (Republican) 25.9%
California 12	D+37	Nancy Pelosi	Democratic	1987	Incumbent re-elected.	▌ ✓ Nancy Pelosi (Democratic) 86.8%; ▌Lisa Remmer (Republican) 13.2%
California 13	D+40	Barbara Lee	Democratic	1998 (special)	Incumbent re-elected.	▌ ✓ Barbara Lee (Democratic) 88.4%; ▌Laura Wells (Green) 11.6%
California 14	D+27	Jackie Speier	Democratic	2008 (special)	Incumbent re-elected.	▌ ✓ Jackie Speier (Democratic) 79.2%; ▌Cristina Osmeña (Republican) 20.8%
California 15	D+20	Eric Swalwell	Democratic	2012	Incumbent re-elected.	▌ ✓ Eric Swalwell (Democratic) 73.0%; ▌Rudy Peters (Republican) 27.0%
California 16	D+9	Jim Costa	Democratic	2004	Incumbent re-elected.	▌ ✓ Jim Costa (Democratic) 57.5%; ▌Elizabeth Heng (Republican) 42.5%
California 17	D+25	Ro Khanna	Democratic	2016	Incumbent re-elected.	▌ ✓ Ro Khanna (Democratic) 75.3%; ▌Ron Cohen (Republican) 24.7%
California 18	D+23	Anna Eshoo	Democratic	1992	Incumbent re-elected.	▌ ✓ Anna Eshoo (Democratic) 74.5%; ▌Christine Russell (Republican) 25.5%
California 19	D+24	Zoe Lofgren	Democratic	1994	Incumbent re-elected.	▌ ✓ Zoe Lofgren (Democratic) 73.8%; ▌Justin Aguilera (Republican) 26.2%
California 20	D+23	Jimmy Panetta	Democratic	2016	Incumbent re-elected.	▌ ✓ Jimmy Panetta (Democratic) 81.4%; ▌Ronald Kabat (Independent) 18.6%
California 21	D+5	David Valadao	Republican	2012	Incumbent lost re-election. New member elected. Democratic gain.	▌ ✓ TJ Cox (Democratic) 50.4%; ▌David Valadao (Republican) 49.6%
California 22	R+8	Devin Nunes	Republican	2002	Incumbent re-elected.	▌ ✓ Devin Nunes (Republican) 52.7%; ▌Andrew Janz (Democratic) 47.3%
California 23	R+14	Kevin McCarthy	Republican	2006	Incumbent re-elected.	▌ ✓ Kevin McCarthy (Republican) 63.7%; ▌Tatiana Matta (Democratic) 36.3%
California 24	D+7	Salud Carbajal	Democratic	2016	Incumbent re-elected.	▌ ✓ Salud Carbajal (Democratic) 58.6%; ▌Justin Fareed (Republican) 41.4%
California 25	Even	Steve Knight	Republican	2014	Incumbent lost re-election. Democratic gain.	▌ ✓ Katie Hill (Democratic) 54.4%; ▌Steve Knight (Republican) 45.6%
California 26	D+7	Julia Brownley	Democratic	2012	Incumbent re-elected.	▌ ✓ Julia Brownley (Democratic) 61.9%; ▌Antonio Sabàto Jr. (Republican) 38.1%
California 27	D+16	Judy Chu	Democratic	2009 (special)	Incumbent re-elected.	▌ ✓ Judy Chu (Democratic) 79.2%; ▌Bryan Witt (Democratic) 20.8%
California 28	D+23	Adam Schiff	Democratic	2000	Incumbent re-elected.	▌ ✓ Adam Schiff (Democratic) 78.4%; ▌Johnny Nalbandian (Republican) 21.6%
California 29	D+29	Tony Cárdenas	Democratic	2012	Incumbent re-elected.	▌ ✓ Tony Cárdenas (Democratic) 80.6%; ▌Benito Bernal (Republican) 19.4%
California 30	D+18	Brad Sherman	Democratic	1996	Incumbent re-elected.	▌ ✓ Brad Sherman (Democratic) 73.4%; ▌Mark Reed (Republican) 26.6%
California 31	D+8	Pete Aguilar	Democratic	2014	Incumbent re-elected.	▌ ✓ Pete Aguilar (Democratic) 58.7%; ▌Sean Flynn (Republican) 41.3%
California 32	D+17	Grace Napolitano	Democratic	1998	Incumbent re-elected.	▌ ✓ Grace Napolitano (Democratic) 68.8%; ▌Joshua Scott (Republican) 31.2%
California 33	D+16	Ted Lieu	Democratic	2014	Incumbent re-elected.	▌ ✓ Ted Lieu (Democratic) 70.0%; ▌Kenneth Wright (Republican) 30.0%
California 34	D+35	Jimmy Gomez	Democratic	2017 (special)	Incumbent re-elected.	▌ ✓ Jimmy Gomez (Democratic) 72.5%; ▌Kenneth Mejia (Green) 27.5%
California 35	D+19	Norma Torres	Democratic	2014	Incumbent re-elected.	▌ ✓ Norma Torres (Democratic) 69.4%; ▌Christian Valiente (Republican) 30.6%
California 36	D+2	Raul Ruiz	Democratic	2012	Incumbent re-elected.	▌ ✓ Raul Ruiz (Democratic) 59.0%; ▌Kimberlin Brown Pelzer (Republican) 41.0%
California 37	D+37	Karen Bass	Democratic	2010	Incumbent re-elected.	▌ ✓ Karen Bass (Democratic) 89.1%; ▌Ron Bassilian (Republican) 10.9%
California 38	D+17	Linda Sánchez	Democratic	2002	Incumbent re-elected.	▌ ✓ Linda Sánchez (Democratic) 68.9%; ▌Ryan Downing (Republican) 31.1%
California 39	Even	Ed Royce	Republican	1992	Incumbent retired. New member elected. Democratic gain.	▌ ✓ Gil Cisneros (Democratic) 51.6%; ▌Young Kim (Republican) 48.4%
California 40	D+33	Lucille Roybal-Allard	Democratic	1992	Incumbent re-elected.	▌ ✓ Lucille Roybal-Allard (Democratic) 77.3%; ▌Rodolfo Barragan (Green) 22.7%
California 41	D+12	Mark Takano	Democratic	2012	Incumbent re-elected.	▌ ✓ Mark Takano (Democratic) 65.1%; ▌Aja Smith (Republican) 34.9%
California 42	R+9	Ken Calvert	Republican	1992	Incumbent re-elected.	▌ ✓ Ken Calvert (Republican) 56.5%; ▌Julia Peacock (Democratic) 43.5%
California 43	D+29	Maxine Waters	Democratic	1990	Incumbent re-elected.	▌ ✓ Maxine Waters (Democratic) 77.7%; ▌Omar Navarro (Republican) 22.3%
California 44	D+35	Nanette Barragán	Democratic	2016	Incumbent re-elected.	▌ ✓ Nanette Barragán (Democratic) 68.3%; ▌Aja Brown (Democratic) 31.7%
California 45	R+3	Mimi Walters	Republican	2014	Incumbent lost re-election. Democratic gain.	▌ ✓ Katie Porter (Democratic) 52.1%; ▌Mimi Walters (Republican) 47.9%
California 46	D+15	Lou Correa	Democratic	2016	Incumbent re-elected.	▌ ✓ Lou Correa (Democratic) 69.1%; ▌Russell Lambert (Republican) 30.9%
California 47	D+13	Alan Lowenthal	Democratic	2012	Incumbent re-elected.	▌ ✓ Alan Lowenthal (Democratic) 64.9%; ▌John Briscoe (Republican) 35.1%
California 48	R+4	Dana Rohrabacher	Republican	1988	Incumbent lost re-election. Democratic gain.	▌ ✓ Harley Rouda (Democratic) 53.6%; ▌Dana Rohrabacher (Republican) 46.4%
California 49	R+1	Darrell Issa	Republican	2000	Incumbent retired. Democratic gain.	▌ ✓ Mike Levin (Democratic) 56.4%; ▌Diane Harkey (Republican) 43.6%
California 50	R+11	Duncan D. Hunter	Republican	2008	Incumbent re-elected.	▌ ✓ Duncan D. Hunter (Republican) 51.7%; ▌Ammar Campa-Najjar (Democratic) 48.3%
California 51	D+22	Juan Vargas	Democratic	2012	Incumbent re-elected.	▌ ✓ Juan Vargas (Democratic) 71.2%; ▌Juan Hidalgo (Republican) 28.8%
California 52	D+6	Scott Peters	Democratic	2012	Incumbent re-elected.	▌ ✓ Scott Peters (Democratic) 63.8%; ▌Omar Qudrat (Republican) 36.2%
California 53	D+14	Susan Davis	Democratic	2000	Incumbent re-elected.	▌ ✓ Susan Davis (Democratic) 69.1%; ▌Morgan Murtaugh (Republican) 30.9%

== Colorado ==
The state congressional delegation flipped from a 4–3 Republican majority to a 4–3 Democratic majority.

District		Incumbent			Results	Candidates
Location	2017 PVI	Representative	Party	First elected	Results	Candidates
Colorado 1	D+21	Diana DeGette	Democratic	1996	Incumbent re-elected.	▌ ✓ Diana DeGette (Democratic) 73.8%; ▌Casper Stockham (Republican) 23.0%
Colorado 2	D+9	Jared Polis	Democratic	2008	Incumbent retired to run for Governor of Colorado. Democratic hold.	▌ ✓ Joe Neguse (Democratic) 60.3%; ▌Peter Yu (Republican) 33.6%
Colorado 3	R+6	Scott Tipton	Republican	2010	Incumbent re-elected.	▌ ✓ Scott Tipton (Republican) 51.5%; ▌Diane Mitsch Bush (Democratic) 43.6%
Colorado 4	R+13	Ken Buck	Republican	2014	Incumbent re-elected.	▌ ✓ Ken Buck (Republican) 60.6%; ▌Karen McCormick (Democratic) 39.4%
Colorado 5	R+14	Doug Lamborn	Republican	2006	Incumbent re-elected.	▌ ✓ Doug Lamborn (Republican) 57.0%; ▌Stephany Rose Spaulding (Democratic) 39.3%
Colorado 6	D+2	Mike Coffman	Republican	2008	Incumbent lost re-election. Democratic gain.	▌ ✓ Jason Crow (Democratic) 54.1%; ▌Mike Coffman (Republican) 42.9%
Colorado 7	D+6	Ed Perlmutter	Democratic	2006	Incumbent re-elected.	▌ ✓ Ed Perlmutter (Democratic) 60.4%; ▌Mark Barrington (Republican) 35.4%

== Connecticut ==
The state congressional delegation remained unchanged at 5–0 Democrats.

District		Incumbent			Results	Candidates
Location	2017 PVI	Representative	Party	First elected	Results	Candidates
Connecticut 1	D+12	John B. Larson	Democratic	1998	Incumbent re-elected.	▌ ✓ John B. Larson (Democratic) 63.9%; ▌Jennifer Nye (Republican) 35.0%; ▌Thomas McCormick (Green) 1.1%
Connecticut 2	D+3	Joe Courtney	Democratic	2006	Incumbent re-elected.	▌ ✓ Joe Courtney (Democratic) 62.2%; ▌Danny Postemski (Republican) 35.4%; ▌Michelle Bicking (Green) 1.2%
Connecticut 3	D+9	Rosa DeLauro	Democratic	1990	Incumbent re-elected.	▌ ✓ Rosa DeLauro (Democratic) 64.6%; ▌Angel Cadena (Republican) 35.4%
Connecticut 4	D+7	Jim Himes	Democratic	2008	Incumbent re-elected.	▌ ✓ Jim Himes (Democratic) 61.2%; ▌Harry Arora (Republican) 38.8%
Connecticut 5	D+2	Elizabeth Esty	Democratic	2012	Incumbent retired. Democratic hold.	▌ ✓ Jahana Hayes (Democratic) 55.9%; ▌Manny Santos (Republican) 44.1%

== Delaware ==
Democrats retained control of the sole seat in the state.

District		Incumbent			Results	Candidates
Location	2017 PVI	Representative	Party	First elected	Results	Candidates
Delaware at-large	D+6	Lisa Blunt Rochester	Democratic	2016	Incumbent re-elected.	▌ ✓ Lisa Blunt Rochester (Democratic) 64.5%; ▌Scott Walker (Republican) 35.5%

== Florida ==
The Republican majority was reduced from 16–11 to 14–13.

District		Incumbent			Results	Candidates
Location	2017 PVI	Representative	Party	First elected	Results	Candidates
Florida 1	R+22	Matt Gaetz	Republican	2016	Incumbent re-elected.	▌ ✓ Matt Gaetz (Republican) 67.1%; ▌Jennifer Zimmerman (Democratic) 32.9%
Florida 2	R+18	Neal Dunn	Republican	2016	Incumbent re-elected.	▌ ✓ Neal Dunn (Republican) 67.4%; ▌Bob Rackleff (Democratic) 32.6%
Florida 3	R+9	Ted Yoho	Republican	2012	Incumbent re-elected.	▌ ✓ Ted Yoho (Republican) 57.6%; ▌Yvonne Hayes Hinson (Democratic) 42.4%
Florida 4	R+17	John Rutherford	Republican	2016	Incumbent re-elected.	▌ ✓ John Rutherford (Republican) 65.2%; ▌Ges Selmont (Democratic) 32.3%; ▌Joceline Berrios (Independent) 1.9%; ▌Jason Bulger (Independent) 0.6%
Florida 5	D+12	Al Lawson	Democratic	2016	Incumbent re-elected.	▌ ✓ Al Lawson (Democratic) 66.8%; ▌Virginia Fuller (Republican) 33.2%
Florida 6	R+7	Vacant			Rep. Ron DeSantis (R) resigned September 10, 2018, to run for Governor of Florida. Republican hold.	▌ ✓ Mike Waltz (Republican) 56.3%; ▌Nancy Soderberg (Democratic) 43.7%
Florida 7	Even	Stephanie Murphy	Democratic	2016	Incumbent re-elected.	▌ ✓ Stephanie Murphy (Democratic) 57.7%; ▌Mike Miller (Republican) 42.3%
Florida 8	R+11	Bill Posey	Republican	2008	Incumbent re-elected.	▌ ✓ Bill Posey (Republican) 60.5%; ▌Sanjay Patel (Democratic) 39.5%
Florida 9	D+5	Darren Soto	Democratic	2016	Incumbent re-elected.	▌ ✓ Darren Soto (Democratic) 58.0%; ▌Wayne Liebnitzky (Republican) 42.0%
Florida 10	D+11	Val Demings	Democratic	2016	Incumbent re-elected.	▌ ✓ Val Demings (Democratic); Unopposed
Florida 11	R+15	Daniel Webster	Republican	2010	Incumbent re-elected.	▌ ✓ Daniel Webster (Republican) 65.2%; ▌Dana Cottrell (Democratic) 34.8%
Florida 12	R+8	Gus Bilirakis	Republican	2006	Incumbent re-elected.	▌ ✓ Gus Bilirakis (Republican) 58.1%; ▌Chris Hunter (Democratic) 39.7%; ▌Angelika Purkis (Independent) 2.2%
Florida 13	D+2	Charlie Crist	Democratic	2016	Incumbent re-elected.	▌ ✓ Charlie Crist (Democratic) 57.6%; ▌George Buck (Republican) 42.4%
Florida 14	D+7	Kathy Castor	Democratic	2006	Incumbent re-elected.	▌ ✓ Kathy Castor (Democratic); Unopposed
Florida 15	R+6	Dennis Ross	Republican	2010	Incumbent retired. Republican hold.	▌ ✓ Ross Spano (Republican) 53.0%; ▌Kristen Carlson (Democratic) 47.0%
Florida 16	R+7	Vern Buchanan	Republican	2006	Incumbent re-elected.	▌ ✓ Vern Buchanan (Republican) 54.6%; ▌David Shapiro (Democratic) 45.4%
Florida 17	R+13	Tom Rooney	Republican	2008	Incumbent retired. Republican hold.	▌ ✓ Greg Steube (Republican) 62.3%; ▌Allen Ellison (Democratic) 37.7% (Note: On September 24, 2018, the Democratic nominee in Florida's 17th congressional district, April Freeman, died. On October 1, 2018, Ellison was announced as her replacement on the ballot.)
Florida 18	R+5	Brian Mast	Republican	2016	Incumbent re-elected.	▌ ✓ Brian Mast (Republican) 54.3%; ▌Lauren Baer (Democratic) 45.7%
Florida 19	R+13	Francis Rooney	Republican	2016	Incumbent re-elected.	▌ ✓ Francis Rooney (Republican) 62.3%; ▌David Holden (Democratic) 37.7%
Florida 20	D+31	Alcee Hastings	Democratic	1992	Incumbent re-elected.	▌ ✓ Alcee Hastings (Democratic); Unopposed
Florida 21	D+9	Lois Frankel	Democratic	2012	Incumbent re-elected.	▌ ✓ Lois Frankel (Democratic); Unopposed
Florida 22	D+6	Ted Deutch	Democratic	2010 (special)	Incumbent re-elected.	▌ ✓ Ted Deutch (Democratic) 62.0%; ▌Nicolas Kimaz (Republican) 38.0%
Florida 23	D+11	Debbie Wasserman Schultz	Democratic	2004	Incumbent re-elected.	▌ ✓ Debbie Wasserman Schultz (Democratic) 58.5%; ▌Joseph Kaufman (Republican) 36.0%; ▌Tim Canova (Independent) 5.0%; ▌Don Endriss (Independent) 0.6%
Florida 24	D+34	Frederica Wilson	Democratic	2010	Incumbent re-elected.	▌ ✓ Frederica Wilson (Democratic); Unopposed
Florida 25	R+4	Mario Díaz-Balart	Republican	2002	Incumbent re-elected.	▌ ✓ Mario Díaz-Balart (Republican) 60.5%; ▌Mary Barzee Flores (Democratic) 39.5%
Florida 26	D+6	Carlos Curbelo	Republican	2014	Incumbent lost re-election. Democratic gain.	▌ ✓ Debbie Mucarsel-Powell (Democratic) 50.9%; ▌Carlos Curbelo (Republican) 49.1%
Florida 27	D+5	Ileana Ros-Lehtinen	Republican	1989	Incumbent retired. Democratic gain.	▌ ✓ Donna Shalala (Democratic) 51.8%; ▌María Elvira Salazar (Republican) 45.8%; ▌Mayra Joli (Independent) 2.5%

== Georgia ==
The Republican majority was reduced from 10–4 to 9–5.

District		Incumbent			Results	Candidates
Location	2017 PVI	Representative	Party	First elected	Results	Candidates
Georgia 1	R+9	Buddy Carter	Republican	2014	Incumbent re-elected.	▌ ✓ Buddy Carter (Republican) 57.7%; ▌Lisa Ring (Democratic) 42.3%
Georgia 2	D+6	Sanford Bishop	Democratic	1992	Incumbent re-elected.	▌ ✓ Sanford Bishop (Democratic) 59.6%; ▌Herman West (Republican) 40.4%
Georgia 3	R+18	Drew Ferguson	Republican	2016	Incumbent re-elected.	▌ ✓ Drew Ferguson (Republican) 65.5%; ▌Chuck Enderlin (Democratic) 34.5%
Georgia 4	D+24	Hank Johnson	Democratic	2006	Incumbent re-elected.	▌ ✓ Hank Johnson (Democratic) 78.8%; ▌Joe Profit (Republican) 21.2%
Georgia 5	D+34	John Lewis	Democratic	1986	Incumbent re-elected.	▌ ✓ John Lewis (Democratic) 100%
Georgia 6	R+8	Karen Handel	Republican	2017 (special)	Incumbent lost re-election. Democratic gain.	▌ ✓ Lucy McBath (Democratic) 50.5%; ▌Karen Handel (Republican) 49.5%
Georgia 7	R+9	Rob Woodall	Republican	2010	Incumbent re-elected.	▌ ✓ Rob Woodall (Republican) 50.07%; ▌Carolyn Bourdeaux (Democratic) 49.93%
Georgia 8	R+15	Austin Scott	Republican	2010	Incumbent re-elected.	▌ ✓ Austin Scott (Republican) 99.7%
Georgia 9	R+31	Doug Collins	Republican	2012	Incumbent re-elected.	▌ ✓ Doug Collins (Republican) 79.5%; ▌Josh McCall (Democratic) 20.5%
Georgia 10	R+15	Jody Hice	Republican	2014	Incumbent re-elected.	▌ ✓ Jody Hice (Republican) 62.9%; ▌Tabitha Johnson-Green (Democratic) 37.1%
Georgia 11	R+17	Barry Loudermilk	Republican	2014	Incumbent re-elected.	▌ ✓ Barry Loudermilk (Republican) 61.8%; ▌Flynn Broady (Democratic) 38.2%
Georgia 12	R+9	Rick Allen	Republican	2014	Incumbent re-elected.	▌ ✓ Rick Allen (Republican) 59.5%; ▌Francys Johnson (Democratic) 40.5%
Georgia 13	D+20	David Scott	Democratic	2002	Incumbent re-elected.	▌ ✓ David Scott (Democratic) 76.2%; ▌David Callahan (Republican) 23.8%
Georgia 14	R+27	Tom Graves	Republican	2010 (special)	Incumbent re-elected.	▌ ✓ Tom Graves (Republican) 76.5%; ▌Steve Foster (Democratic) 23.5%

== Hawaii ==
Hawaii maintained its 2-0 Democratic hold.

District		Incumbent			Results	Candidates
Location	2017 PVI	Representative	Party	First elected	Results	Candidates
Hawaii 1	D+17	Colleen Hanabusa	Democratic	2010; 2014 (retired); 2016	Incumbent retired to run for Governor of Hawaii. Democratic hold.	▌ ✓ Ed Case (Democratic) 73.1%; ▌Cam Cavasso (Republican) 23.1%; ▌Michelle Tippens (Libertarian) 1.9%; ▌Zachary Burd (Green) 1.2%; ▌Calvin Griffin (Nonpartisan) 0.7%
Hawaii 2	D+19	Tulsi Gabbard	Democratic	2012	Incumbent re-elected.	▌ ✓ Tulsi Gabbard (Democratic) 77.4%; ▌Brian Evans (Republican) 22.6%

== Idaho ==
Idaho maintained its 2-0 Republican hold.

District		Incumbent			Results	Candidates
Location	2017 PVI	Representative	Party	First elected	Results	Candidates
Idaho 1	R+21	Raúl Labrador	Republican	2010	Incumbent retired to run for Governor of Idaho. Republican hold.	▌ ✓ Russ Fulcher (Republican) 62.8%; ▌Cristina McNeil (Democratic) 30.8%; ▌Natalie Fleming (Independent) 2.0%; ▌W. Scott Howard (Libertarian) 1.7%; ▌Paul Farmer (Independent) 1.4%; ▌Pro-Life (Constitution) 1.0%; ▌Gordon Counsil (Independent) 0.3%
Idaho 2	R+17	Mike Simpson	Republican	1998	Incumbent re-elected.	▌ ✓ Mike Simpson (Republican) 60.7%; ▌Aaron Swisher (Democratic) 39.3%

== Illinois ==
The Democratic majority increased from 11–7 to 13–5.

District		Incumbent			Results	Candidates
Location	2017 PVI	Representative	Party	First elected	Results	Candidates
Illinois 1	D+27	Bobby Rush	Democratic	1992	Incumbent re-elected.	▌ ✓ Bobby Rush (Democratic) 73.5%; ▌Jimmy Tillman (Republican) 19.8%
Illinois 2	D+29	Robin Kelly	Democratic	2013 (special)	Incumbent re-elected.	▌ ✓ Robin Kelly (Democratic) 81.1%; ▌David Merkle (Republican) 18.9%
Illinois 3	D+6	Dan Lipinski	Democratic	2004	Incumbent re-elected.	▌ ✓ Dan Lipinski (Democratic) 73.8%; ▌Arthur Jones (Republican) 26.2%
Illinois 4	D+33	Luis Gutiérrez	Democratic	1992	Incumbent retired. Democratic hold.	▌ ✓ Chuy García (Democratic) 86.6%; ▌Mark Lorch (Republican) 13.4%
Illinois 5	D+20	Mike Quigley	Democratic	2009 (special)	Incumbent re-elected.	▌ ✓ Mike Quigley (Democratic) 76.7%; ▌Tom Hanson (Republican) 23.3%
Illinois 6	R+2	Peter Roskam	Republican	2006	Incumbent lost re-election. Democratic gain.	▌ ✓ Sean Casten (Democratic) 53.6%; ▌Peter Roskam (Republican) 46.4%
Illinois 7	D+38	Danny Davis	Democratic	1996	Incumbent re-elected.	▌ ✓ Danny Davis (Democratic) 87.6%; ▌Craig Cameron (Republican) 12.4%
Illinois 8	D+8	Raja Krishnamoorthi	Democratic	2016	Incumbent re-elected.	▌ ✓ Raja Krishnamoorthi (Democratic) 66.0%; ▌J. D. Diganvker (Republican) 34.0%
Illinois 9	D+18	Jan Schakowsky	Democratic	1998	Incumbent re-elected.	▌ ✓ Jan Schakowsky (Democratic) 73.5%; ▌John Elleson (Republican) 26.5%
Illinois 10	D+10	Brad Schneider	Democratic	2012; 2014 (defeated); 2016	Incumbent re-elected.	▌ ✓ Brad Schneider (Democratic) 65.6%; ▌Douglas Bennett (Republican) 34.4%
Illinois 11	D+9	Bill Foster	Democratic	2008 (special); 2010 (defeated); 2012	Incumbent re-elected.	▌ ✓ Bill Foster (Democratic) 63.8%; ▌Nick Stella (Republican) 36.2%
Illinois 12	R+5	Mike Bost	Republican	2014	Incumbent re-elected.	▌ ✓ Mike Bost (Republican) 51.6%; ▌Brendan Kelly (Democratic) 45.4%; ▌Randall Auxier (Green) 3.0%
Illinois 13	R+3	Rodney Davis	Republican	2012	Incumbent re-elected.	▌ ✓ Rodney Davis (Republican) 50.4%; ▌Betsy Dirksen Londrigan (Democratic) 49.6%
Illinois 14	R+5	Randy Hultgren	Republican	2010	Incumbent lost re-election. Democratic gain.	▌ ✓ Lauren Underwood (Democratic) 52.5%; ▌Randy Hultgren (Republican) 47.5%
Illinois 15	R+21	John Shimkus	Republican	1996	Incumbent re-elected.	▌ ✓ John Shimkus (Republican) 70.9%; ▌Kevin Gaither (Democratic) 29.1%
Illinois 16	R+8	Adam Kinzinger	Republican	2010	Incumbent re-elected.	▌ ✓ Adam Kinzinger (Republican) 59.1%; ▌Sara Dady (Democratic) 40.9%
Illinois 17	D+3	Cheri Bustos	Democratic	2012	Incumbent re-elected.	▌ ✓ Cheri Bustos (Democratic) 62.1%; ▌Bill Fawell (Republican) 37.9%
Illinois 18	R+15	Darin LaHood	Republican	2015 (special)	Incumbent re-elected.	▌ ✓ Darin LaHood (Republican) 67.2%; ▌Junius Rodriguez (Democratic) 32.8%

== Indiana ==
The Republican majority remained at 7–2.

District		Incumbent			Results	Candidates
Location	2017 PVI	Representative	Party	First elected	Results	Candidates
Indiana 1	D+8	Pete Visclosky	Democratic	1984	Incumbent re-elected.	▌ ✓ Pete Visclosky (Democratic) 65.1%; ▌Mark Leyva (Republican) 34.9%
Indiana 2	R+11	Jackie Walorski	Republican	2012	Incumbent re-elected.	▌ ✓ Jackie Walorski (Republican) 54.8%; ▌Mel Hall (Democratic) 45.2%
Indiana 3	R+18	Jim Banks	Republican	2016	Incumbent re-elected.	▌ ✓ Jim Banks (Republican) 64.7%; ▌Courtney Tritch (Democratic) 35.3%
Indiana 4	R+17	Todd Rokita	Republican	2010	Incumbent retired to run for U.S. Senator. Republican hold.	▌ ✓ Jim Baird (Republican) 64.1%; ▌Tobi Beck (Democratic) 35.9%
Indiana 5	R+9	Susan Brooks	Republican	2012	Incumbent re-elected.	▌ ✓ Susan Brooks (Republican) 56.8%; ▌Dee Thornton (Democratic) 43.2%
Indiana 6	R+18	Luke Messer	Republican	2012	Incumbent retired to run for U.S. Senator. Republican hold.	▌ ✓ Greg Pence (Republican) 63.8%; ▌Jeannine Lake (Democratic) 32.9%
Indiana 7	D+11	André Carson	Democratic	2008 (special)	Incumbent re-elected.	▌ ✓ André Carson (Democratic) 64.9%; ▌Wayne Harmon (Republican) 35.1%
Indiana 8	R+15	Larry Bucshon	Republican	2010	Incumbent re-elected.	▌ ✓ Larry Bucshon (Republican) 64.4%; ▌William Tanoos (Democratic) 35.6%
Indiana 9	R+13	Trey Hollingsworth	Republican	2016	Incumbent re-elected.	▌ ✓ Trey Hollingsworth (Republican) 56.5%; ▌Liz Watson (Democratic) 43.5%

== Iowa ==
Iowa's delegation flipped from a 3–1 Republican majority to a 3–1 Democratic majority.

District		Incumbent			Results	Candidates
Location	2017 PVI	Representative	Party	First elected	Results	Candidates
Iowa 1	D+1	Rod Blum	Republican	2014	Incumbent lost re-election. Democratic gain.	▌ ✓ Abby Finkenauer (Democratic) 51.0%; ▌Rod Blum (Republican) 45.9%; ▌Troy Hageman (Libertarian) 3.1%
Iowa 2	D+1	Dave Loebsack	Democratic	2006	Incumbent re-elected.	▌ ✓ Dave Loebsack (Democratic) 54.8%; ▌Christopher Peters (Republican) 42.6%; ▌Mike Strauss (Libertarian) 2.0%; ▌Daniel Clark (Independent) 0.6%
Iowa 3	R+1	David Young	Republican	2014	Incumbent lost re-election. Democratic gain.	▌ ✓ Cindy Axne (Democratic) 49.3%; ▌David Young (Republican) 47.2%; ▌Bryan Holder (Libertarian) 2.0%; Others: ▌Mark Elworth (Legal Marijuana Now) 0.5%; ▌Paul Knupp (Green) 0.5%; ▌Joe Grandanette (Independent) 0.4%
Iowa 4	R+11	Steve King	Republican	2002	Incumbent re-elected.	▌ ✓ Steve King (Republican) 50.4%; ▌J. D. Scholten (Democratic) 47.0%; ▌Charles Aldrich (Libertarian) 2.0%; ▌Edward Peterson (Independent) 0.6%

== Kansas ==
The Republican majority slipped from 4–0 to 3–1.

District		Incumbent			Results	Candidates
Location	2017 PVI	Representative	Party	First elected	Results	Candidates
Kansas 1	R+24	Roger Marshall	Republican	2016	Incumbent re-elected.	▌ ✓ Roger Marshall (Republican) 68.1%; ▌Alan LaPolice (Democratic) 31.9%
Kansas 2	R+10	Lynn Jenkins	Republican	2008	Incumbent retired. Republican hold.	▌ ✓ Steve Watkins (Republican) 47.6%; ▌Paul Davis (Democratic) 46.8%; ▌Kelly Standley (Libertarian) 5.6%
Kansas 3	R+4	Kevin Yoder	Republican	2010	Incumbent lost re-election. Democratic gain.	▌ ✓ Sharice Davids (Democratic) 53.6%; ▌Kevin Yoder (Republican) 43.9%; ▌Chris Clemmons (Libertarian) 2.5%
Kansas 4	R+15	Ron Estes	Republican	2017 (special)	Incumbent re-elected.	▌ ✓ Ron Estes (Republican) 59.4%; ▌James Thompson (Democratic) 40.6%

== Kentucky ==
Republicans maintained their 5–1 majority.

District		Incumbent			Results	Candidates
Location	2017 PVI	Representative	Party	First elected	Results	Candidates
Kentucky 1	R+23	James Comer	Republican	2016	Incumbent re-elected.	▌ ✓ James Comer (Republican) 68.6%; ▌Paul Walker (Democratic) 31.4%
Kentucky 2	R+19	Brett Guthrie	Republican	2008	Incumbent re-elected.	▌ ✓ Brett Guthrie (Republican) 66.7%; ▌Hank Linderman (Democratic) 31.1%; ▌Thomas Loecken (Independent) 2.2%
Kentucky 3	D+6	John Yarmuth	Democratic	2006	Incumbent re-elected.	▌ ✓ John Yarmuth (Democratic) 62.1%; ▌Vickie Glisson (Republican) 36.6%; ▌Gregory Boles (Libertarian) 1.4%
Kentucky 4	R+18	Thomas Massie	Republican	2012	Incumbent re-elected.	▌ ✓ Thomas Massie (Republican) 62.2%; ▌Seth Hall (Democratic) 34.6%; ▌Mike Moffett (Independent) 3.2%
Kentucky 5	R+31	Hal Rogers	Republican	1980	Incumbent re-elected.	▌ ✓ Hal Rogers (Republican) 78.9%; ▌Kenneth Stepp (Democratic) 21.1%
Kentucky 6	R+9	Andy Barr	Republican	2012	Incumbent re-elected.	▌ ✓ Andy Barr (Republican) 51.0%; ▌Amy McGrath (Democratic) 47.8%; Others: ▌Frank Harris (Libertarian) 0.7%; ▌Rikka Wallin (Independent) 0.3%; ▌James Germalic (Independent) 0.2%

== Louisiana ==
All incumbents were re-elected, and Republicans maintained their 5–1 majority.

District		Incumbent			Results	Candidates
Location	2017 PVI	Representative	Party	First elected	Results	Candidates
Louisiana 1	R+24	Steve Scalise	Republican	2008 (special)	Incumbent re-elected.	▌ ✓ Steve Scalise (Republican) 71.5%; ▌Tammy Savoie (Democratic) 16.4%; ▌Lee Ann Dugas (Democratic) 6.9%; ▌Jim Francis (Democratic) 3.2%; ▌Howard Kearney (Libertarian) 1.0%; ▌Ferd Jones (Independent) 0.9%
Louisiana 2	D+25	Cedric Richmond	Democratic	2010	Incumbent re-elected.	▌ ✓ Cedric Richmond (Democratic) 80.6%; ▌Jesse Schmidt (Independent) 8.7%; ▌Belden Batiste (Independent) 7.3%; ▌Shawndra Rodriguez (Independent) 3.4%
Louisiana 3	R+20	Clay Higgins	Republican	2016	Incumbent re-elected.	▌ ✓ Clay Higgins (Republican) 55.7%; ▌Mimi Methvin (Democratic) 17.8%; ▌Josh Guillory (Republican) 12.8%; ▌Rob Anderson (Democratic) 5.5%; ▌Larry Rader (Democratic) 3.9%; ▌Verone Thomas (Democratic) 3.2%; ▌Aaron Andrus (Libertarian) 1.2%
Louisiana 4	R+13	Mike Johnson	Republican	2016	Incumbent re-elected.	▌ ✓ Mike Johnson (Republican) 64.2%; ▌Ryan Trundle (Democratic) 33.6%; ▌Mark Halverson (Independent) 2.1%
Louisiana 5	R+15	Ralph Abraham	Republican	2014	Incumbent re-elected.	▌ ✓ Ralph Abraham (Republican) 66.5%; ▌Jessee Fleenor (Democratic) 30.0%; ▌Billy Burkette (Independent) 2.0%; ▌Kyle Randol (Libertarian) 1.3%
Louisiana 6	R+19	Garret Graves	Republican	2014	Incumbent re-elected.	▌ ✓ Garret Graves (Republican) 69.5%; ▌Justin DeWitt (Democratic) 20.5%; ▌Andie Saizan (Democratic) 8.1%; ▌Devin Graham (Independent) 2.0%

== Maine ==
The 1–1 tie became a 2–0 Democratic hold. This was the first use of ranked choice voting to decide a House race.

District		Incumbent			Results	Candidates
Location	2017 PVI	Representative	Party	First elected	Results	Candidates
Maine 1	D+8	Chellie Pingree	Democratic	2008	Incumbent re-elected.	▌ ✓ Chellie Pingree (Democratic) 58.7%; ▌Mark Holbrook (Republican) 32.4%; ▌Martin Grohman (Independent) 8.9%
Maine 2	R+2	Bruce Poliquin	Republican	2014	Incumbent lost re-election. Democratic gain.	First round: ▌ Bruce Poliquin (Republican) 46.3%; ▌ Jared Golden (Democratic) 45.6%; ▌Tiffany Bond (Independent) 5.7%; ▌Will Hoar (Independent) 2.4%; Instant runoff: ▌ ✓ Jared Golden (Democratic) 50.6%; ▌Bruce Poliquin (Republican) 49.4%

== Maryland ==
Democrats maintained their 7–1 majority.

District		Incumbent			Results	Candidates
Location	2017 PVI	Representative	Party	First elected	Results	Candidates
Maryland 1	R+14	Andy Harris	Republican	2010	Incumbent re-elected.	▌ ✓ Andy Harris (Republican) 60.0%; ▌Jesse Colvin (Democratic) 38.1%; ▌Jenica Martin (Libertarian) 1.9%
Maryland 2	D+11	Dutch Ruppersberger	Democratic	2002	Incumbent re-elected.	▌ ✓ Dutch Ruppersberger (Democratic) 66.1%; ▌Liz Matory (Republican) 30.7%; ▌Guy Mimoun (Green) 3.2%
Maryland 3	D+13	John Sarbanes	Democratic	2006	Incumbent re-elected.	▌ ✓ John Sarbanes (Democratic) 69.2%; ▌Charles Anthony (Republican) 28.3%; ▌David Lashar (Libertarian) 2.5%
Maryland 4	D+28	Anthony Brown	Democratic	2016	Incumbent re-elected.	▌ ✓ Anthony Brown (Democratic) 78.1%; ▌George McDermott (Republican) 19.9%; ▌David Bishop (Libertarian) 2.0%
Maryland 5	D+16	Steny Hoyer	Democratic	1981 (special)	Incumbent re-elected.	▌ ✓ Steny Hoyer (Democratic) 70.4%; ▌William Devine III (Republican) 27.1%; ▌Pat Elder (Green) 1.3%; ▌Jacob Pulcher (Libertarian) 1.2%
Maryland 6	D+6	John Delaney	Democratic	2012	Incumbent retired to run for U.S. President. Democratic hold.	▌ ✓ David Trone (Democratic) 59.0%; ▌Amie Hoeber (Republican) 38.0%; ▌Kevin Caldwell (Libertarian) 1.8%; ▌George Gluck (Green) 1.2%
Maryland 7	D+26	Elijah Cummings	Democratic	1996	Incumbent re-elected.	▌ ✓ Elijah Cummings (Democratic) 76.5%; ▌Richmond Davis (Republican) 21.3%; ▌Swami Swaminathan (Independent) 2.2%
Maryland 8	D+14	Jamie Raskin	Democratic	2016	Incumbent re-elected.	▌ ✓ Jamie Raskin (Democratic) 68.2%; ▌John Walsh (Republican) 30.3%; ▌Jasen Wunder (Libertarian) 1.5%

== Massachusetts ==
Democrats maintained their 9–0 hold.

District		Incumbent			Results	Candidates
Location	2017 PVI	Representative	Party	First elected	Results	Candidates
Massachusetts 1	D+12	Richard Neal	Democratic	1988	Incumbent re-elected.	▌ ✓ Richard Neal (Democratic); Uncontested
Massachusetts 2	D+9	Jim McGovern	Democratic	1996	Incumbent re-elected.	▌ ✓ Jim McGovern (Democratic) 67.2%; ▌Tracy Lovvorn (Republican) 32.8%
Massachusetts 3	D+9	Niki Tsongas	Democratic	2007 (special)	Incumbent retired. Democratic hold.	▌ ✓ Lori Trahan (Democratic) 62.0%; ▌Rick Green (Republican) 33.5%; ▌Michael Mullen (Independent) 4.5%
Massachusetts 4	D+9	Joe Kennedy III	Democratic	2012	Incumbent re-elected.	▌ ✓ Joe Kennedy III (Democratic); Uncontested
Massachusetts 5	D+18	Katherine Clark	Democratic	2013 (special)	Incumbent re-elected.	▌ ✓ Katherine Clark (Democratic) 75.9%; ▌John Hugo (Republican) 24.1%
Massachusetts 6	D+6	Seth Moulton	Democratic	2014	Incumbent re-elected.	▌ ✓ Seth Moulton (Democratic) 65.2%; ▌Joseph Schneider (Republican) 31.4%; ▌Mary Jean Charbonneau (Independent) 3.4%
Massachusetts 7	D+34	Mike Capuano	Democratic	1998	Incumbent lost renomination. Democratic hold.	▌ ✓ Ayanna Pressley (Democratic); Uncontested
Massachusetts 8	D+10	Stephen Lynch	Democratic	2001 (special)	Incumbent re-elected.	▌ ✓ Stephen Lynch (Democratic); Uncontested
Massachusetts 9	D+4	Bill Keating	Democratic	2010	Incumbent re-elected.	▌ ✓ Bill Keating (Democratic) 59.4%; ▌Peter Tedeschi (Republican) 40.6%

== Michigan ==
The delegation flipped from a 9–5 Republican majority to a 7–7 split.

District		Incumbent			Results	Candidates
Location	2017 PVI	Representative	Party	First elected	Results	Candidates
Michigan 1	R+9	Jack Bergman	Republican	2016	Incumbent re-elected.	▌ ✓ Jack Bergman (Republican) 56.3%; ▌Matt Morgan (Democratic) 43.7%
Michigan 2	R+9	Bill Huizenga	Republican	2010	Incumbent re-elected.	▌ ✓ Bill Huizenga (Republican) 55.3%; ▌Rob Davidson (Democratic) 43.0%; ▌Ronald Graeser (U.S. Taxpayers) 1.7%
Michigan 3	R+6	Justin Amash	Republican	2010	Incumbent re-elected.	▌ ✓ Justin Amash (Republican) 54.4%; ▌Cathy Albro (Democratic) 43.2%; ▌Ted Gerrard (U.S. Taxpayers) 2.4%
Michigan 4	R+10	John Moolenaar	Republican	2014	Incumbent re-elected.	▌ ✓ John Moolenaar (Republican) 62.6%; ▌Jerry Hilliard (Democratic) 37.4%
Michigan 5	D+5	Dan Kildee	Democratic	2012	Incumbent re-elected.	▌ ✓ Dan Kildee (Democratic) 59.5%; ▌Travis Wines (Republican) 35.9%; ▌Kathy Goodwin (Working Class) 4.6%
Michigan 6	R+4	Fred Upton	Republican	1986	Incumbent re-elected.	▌ ✓ Fred Upton (Republican) 50.2%; ▌Matt Longjohn (Democratic) 45.7%; ▌Stephen Young (U.S. Taxpayers) 4.1%
Michigan 7	R+7	Tim Walberg	Republican	2006; 2008 (defeated); 2010	Incumbent re-elected.	▌ ✓ Tim Walberg (Republican) 53.8%; ▌Gretchen Driskell (Democratic) 46.2%
Michigan 8	R+4	Mike Bishop	Republican	2014	Incumbent lost re-election. Democratic gain.	▌ ✓ Elissa Slotkin (Democratic) 50.6%; ▌Mike Bishop (Republican) 46.8%; ▌Brian Ellison (Libertarian) 1.8%; ▌David Lillis (U.S. Taxpayers) 0.8%
Michigan 9	D+4	Sander Levin	Democratic	1982	Incumbent retired. Democratic hold.	▌ ✓ Andy Levin (Democratic) 59.6%; ▌Candius Stearns (Republican) 36.8%; ▌Andrea Kirby (Working Class) 2.2%; ▌John McDermott (Green) 1.3%
Michigan 10	R+13	Paul Mitchell	Republican	2016	Incumbent re-elected.	▌ ✓ Paul Mitchell (Republican) 60.3%; ▌Kimberly Bizon (Democratic) 35.0%; ▌Jeremy Peruski (Independent) 3.8%; ▌Harley Mikkelson (Green) 1.0%
Michigan 11	R+4	David Trott	Republican	2014	Incumbent retired. Democratic gain.	▌ ✓ Haley Stevens (Democratic) 51.8%; ▌Lena Epstein (Republican) 45.2%; ▌Leonard Schwartz (Libertarian) 1.7%; ▌Cooper Nye (Independent) 1.3%
Michigan 12	D+14	Debbie Dingell	Democratic	2014	Incumbent re-elected.	▌ ✓ Debbie Dingell (Democratic) 68.1%; ▌Jeff Jones (Republican) 28.9%; ▌Gary Walkowicz (Working Class) 2.3%; ▌Niles Niemuth (Independent) 0.8%
Michigan 13	D+32	Vacant			Rep. John Conyers Jr. (D) resigned December 5, 2017. Democratic hold. A different Democratic candidate was elected the same day to finish the current term.	▌ ✓ Rashida Tlaib (Democratic) 84.6%; ▌Sam Johnson (Working Class) 11.3%; ▌Etta Wilcoxon (Green) 4.1%
Michigan 14	D+30	Brenda Lawrence	Democratic	2014	Incumbent re-elected.	▌ ✓ Brenda Lawrence (Democratic) 80.9%; ▌Marc Herschfus (Republican) 17.3%; ▌Philip Kolody (Working Class) 1.4%

== Minnesota ==
Although half of the seats switched parties, Democrats maintained the same 5–3 majority.

District		Incumbent			Results	Candidates
Location	2017 PVI	Representative	Party	First elected	Results	Candidates
Minnesota 1	R+5	Tim Walz	DFL	2006	Incumbent retired to run for Governor of Minnesota. Republican gain.	▌ ✓ Jim Hagedorn (Republican) 50.2%; ▌Dan Feehan (DFL) 49.8%
Minnesota 2	R+2	Jason Lewis	Republican	2016	Incumbent lost re-election. DFL gain.	▌ ✓ Angie Craig (DFL) 52.8%; ▌Jason Lewis (Republican) 47.2%
Minnesota 3	D+1	Erik Paulsen	Republican	2008	Incumbent lost re-election. DFL gain.	▌ ✓ Dean Phillips (DFL) 55.7%; ▌Erik Paulsen (Republican) 44.3%
Minnesota 4	D+14	Betty McCollum	DFL	2000	Incumbent re-elected.	▌ ✓ Betty McCollum (DFL) 66.0%; ▌Greg Ryan (Republican) 29.8%; ▌Susan Pendergast Sindt (Legal Marijuana Now) 4.2%
Minnesota 5	D+26	Keith Ellison	DFL	2006	Incumbent retired to run for Minnesota Attorney General. DFL hold.	▌ ✓ Ilhan Omar (DFL) 78.2%; ▌Jennifer Zielinski (Republican) 21.8%
Minnesota 6	R+12	Tom Emmer	Republican	2014	Incumbent re-elected.	▌ ✓ Tom Emmer (Republican) 61.2%; ▌Ian Todd (DFL) 38.8%
Minnesota 7	R+12	Collin Peterson	DFL	1990	Incumbent re-elected.	▌ ✓ Collin Peterson (DFL) 52.1%; ▌Dave Hughes (Republican) 47.9%
Minnesota 8	R+4	Rick Nolan	DFL	1974; 1980 (retired); 2012	Incumbent retired. Republican gain.	▌ ✓ Pete Stauber (Republican) 50.7%; ▌Joe Radinovich (DFL) 45.2%; ▌Skip Sandman (Independence) 4.1%

== Mississippi ==
The Republicans maintained their 3–1 majority in the state.

District		Incumbent			Results	Candidates
Location	2017 PVI	Representative	Party	First elected	Results	Candidates
Mississippi 1	R+16	Trent Kelly	Republican	2015 (special)	Incumbent re-elected.	▌ ✓ Trent Kelly (Republican) 66.9%; ▌Randy Wadkins (Democratic) 32.4%; ▌Tracella O'Hara Hill (Reform) 0.7%
Mississippi 2	D+14	Bennie Thompson	Democratic	1992	Incumbent re-elected.	▌ ✓ Bennie Thompson (Democratic) 71.8%; ▌Troy Ray (Independent) 21.7%; ▌Irving Harris (Reform) 6.5%
Mississippi 3	R+13	Gregg Harper	Republican	2008	Incumbent retired. Republican hold.	▌ ✓ Michael Guest (Republican) 62.3%; ▌Michael Evans (Democratic) 36.7%; ▌Matthew Holland (Reform) 1.0%
Mississippi 4	R+21	Steven Palazzo	Republican	2010	Incumbent re-elected.	▌ ✓ Steven Palazzo (Republican) 68.2%; ▌Jeramey Anderson (Democratic) 30.7%; ▌Lajena Sheets (Reform) 1.0%

== Missouri ==
The Republicans maintained their 6-2 seat majority.

District		Incumbent			Results	Candidates
Location	2017 PVI	Representative	Party	First elected	Results	Candidates
Missouri 1	D+29	Lacy Clay	Democratic	2000	Incumbent re-elected.	▌ ✓ Lacy Clay (Democratic) 80.1%; ▌Robert Vroman (Republican) 16.7%; ▌Robb Cunningham (Libertarian) 3.2%
Missouri 2	R+8	Ann Wagner	Republican	2012	Incumbent re-elected.	▌ ✓ Ann Wagner (Republican) 51.2%; ▌Cort VanOstran (Democratic) 47.2%; ▌Larry Kirk (Libertarian) 1.1%; ▌David Arnold (Green) 0.5%
Missouri 3	R+18	Blaine Luetkemeyer	Republican	2008	Incumbent re-elected.	▌ ✓ Blaine Luetkemeyer (Republican) 65.1%; ▌Katy Geppert (Democratic) 32.8%; ▌Donald Stolle (Libertarian) 2.1%
Missouri 4	R+17	Vicky Hartzler	Republican	2010	Incumbent re-elected.	▌ ✓ Vicky Hartzler (Republican) 64.8%; ▌Renee Hoagenson (Democratic) 32.7%; ▌Mark Bliss (Libertarian) 2.4%
Missouri 5	D+7	Emanuel Cleaver	Democratic	2004	Incumbent re-elected.	▌ ✓ Emanuel Cleaver (Democratic) 61.7%; ▌Jacob Turk (Republican) 35.5%; ▌Alexander Howell (Libertarian) 1.7%; ▌Maurice Copeland (Green) 0.7%; ▌E. C. Fredland (Constitution) 0.3%
Missouri 6	R+16	Sam Graves	Republican	2000	Incumbent re-elected.	▌ ✓ Sam Graves (Republican) 65.4%; ▌Henry Martin (Democratic) 32.0%; ▌Dan Hogan (Libertarian) 2.6%
Missouri 7	R+23	Billy Long	Republican	2010	Incumbent re-elected.	▌ ✓ Billy Long (Republican) 66.2%; ▌Jamie Schoolcraft (Democratic) 30.1%; ▌Benjamin Brixey (Libertarian) 3.7%
Missouri 8	R+24	Jason Smith	Republican	2013 (special)	Incumbent re-elected.	▌ ✓ Jason Smith (Republican) 73.4%; ▌Kathy Ellis (Democratic) 25.0%; ▌Jonathan Shell (Libertarian) 1.6%

== Montana ==
Republicans maintained control of the lone house seat.

District		Incumbent			Results	Candidates
Location	2017 PVI	Representative	Party	First elected	Results	Candidates
Montana at-large	R+11	Greg Gianforte	Republican	2017 (special)	Incumbent re-elected.	▌ ✓ Greg Gianforte (Republican) 50.9%; ▌Kathleen Williams (Democratic) 46.2%; ▌Elinor Swanson (Libertarian) 2.9%

== Nebraska ==
Republicans maintained their 3–0 majority.

District		Incumbent			Results	Candidates
Location	2017 PVI	Representative	Party	First elected	Results	Candidates
Nebraska 1	R+11	Jeff Fortenberry	Republican	2004	Incumbent re-elected.	▌ ✓ Jeff Fortenberry (Republican) 60.4%; ▌Jessica McClure (Democratic) 39.6%
Nebraska 2	R+4	Don Bacon	Republican	2016	Incumbent re-elected.	▌ ✓ Don Bacon (Republican) 51.0%; ▌Kara Eastman (Democratic) 49.0%
Nebraska 3	R+27	Adrian Smith	Republican	2006	Incumbent re-elected.	▌ ✓ Adrian Smith (Republican) 76.7%; ▌Paul Theobald (Democratic) 23.3%

== Nevada ==
Democrats maintained their 3–1 majority.

District		Incumbent			Results	Candidates
Location	2017 PVI	Representative	Party	First elected	Results	Candidates
Nevada 1	D+15	Dina Titus	Democratic	2008; 2010 (defeated); 2012	Incumbent re-elected.	▌ ✓ Dina Titus (Democratic) 66.2%; ▌Joyce Bentley (Republican) 30.9%; ▌Dan Garfield (Independent American) 1.6%; ▌Robert Strawder (Libertarian) 1.4%
Nevada 2	R+7	Mark Amodei	Republican	2011 (special)	Incumbent re-elected.	▌ ✓ Mark Amodei (Republican) 58.2%; ▌Clint Koble (Democratic) 41.8%
Nevada 3	R+2	Jacky Rosen	Democratic	2016	Incumbent retired to run for U.S. Senator. Democratic hold.	▌ ✓ Susie Lee (Democratic) 51.9%; ▌Danny Tarkanian (Republican) 42.8%; ▌Steve Brown (Libertarian) 1.6%; ▌David Goossen (Independent) 1.3%; ▌Harry Vickers (Independent American) 1.2%; Others: ▌Gil Eisner (Independent) 0.7%; ▌Tony Gumina (Independent) 0.5%
Nevada 4	D+3	Ruben Kihuen	Democratic	2016	Incumbent retired. Democratic hold.	▌ ✓ Steven Horsford (Democratic) 51.9%; ▌Cresent Hardy (Republican) 43.7%; ▌Warren Markowitz (Independent American) 1.4%; ▌Rodney Smith (Independent) 1.2%; Others: ▌Gregg Luckner (Libertarian) 0.9%; ▌Dean McGonigle (Independent) 0.9%

== New Hampshire ==
The Democrats maintained control of both house seats.

District		Incumbent			Results	Candidates
Location	2017 PVI	Representative	Party	First elected	Results	Candidates
New Hampshire 1	R+2	Carol Shea-Porter	Democratic	2006; 2010 (defeated); 2012; 2014 (defeated); 2016	Incumbent retired. Democratic hold.	▌ ✓ Chris Pappas (Democratic) 53.6%; ▌Eddie Edwards (Republican) 45.0%; ▌Dan Belforti (Libertarian) 1.4%
New Hampshire 2	D+2	Annie Kuster	Democratic	2012	Incumbent re-elected.	▌ ✓ Annie Kuster (Democratic) 55.6%; ▌Steve Negron (Republican) 42.2%; ▌Justin O'Donnell (Libertarian) 2.2%

== New Jersey ==
The state congressional delegation changed from 7–5 for Democrats to 11–1 for Democrats.

District		Incumbent			Results	Candidates
Location	2017 PVI	Representative	Party	First elected	Results	Candidates
New Jersey 1	D+13	Donald Norcross	Democratic	2014	Incumbent re-elected.	▌ ✓ Donald Norcross (Democratic) 64.4%; ▌Paul Dilks (Republican) 33.3%; ▌Robert Shapiro (Independent) 1.1%; Others: ▌Paul Hamlin (Independent) 0.9%; ▌Mohammad Kabir (Independent) 0.4%
New Jersey 2	R+1	Frank LoBiondo	Republican	1994	Incumbent retired. Democratic gain.	▌ ✓ Jeff Van Drew (Democratic) 52.9%; ▌Seth Grossman (Republican) 45.2%; Others: ▌John Ordille (Independent) 0.7%; ▌Steven Fenichel (Independent) 0.4%; ▌Anthony Sanchez (Independent) 0.4%; ▌William Benfer (Independent) 0.3%
New Jersey 3	R+2	Tom MacArthur	Republican	2014	Incumbent lost re-election. Democratic gain.	▌ ✓ Andy Kim (Democratic) 50.0%; ▌Tom MacArthur (Republican) 48.7%; ▌Lawrence Berlinski (Independent) 1.3%
New Jersey 4	R+8	Chris Smith	Republican	1980	Incumbent re-elected.	▌ ✓ Chris Smith (Republican) 55.4%; ▌Josh Welle (Democratic) 43.1%; Others: ▌Michael Rufo (Independent) 0.5%; ▌Edward Stackhouse (Independent) 0.4%; ▌Brian Reynolds (Independent) 0.3%; ▌Felicia Stoler (Independent) 0.3%; ▌Allen Yusufov (Independent) 0.1%
New Jersey 5	R+3	Josh Gottheimer	Democratic	2016	Incumbent re-elected.	▌ ✓ Josh Gottheimer (Democratic) 56.2%; ▌John McCann (Republican) 42.5%; Others: ▌James Tosone (Independent) 0.7%; ▌Wendy Goetz (Independent) 0.6%
New Jersey 6	D+9	Frank Pallone	Democratic	1988	Incumbent re-elected.	▌ ✓ Frank Pallone (Democratic) 63.6%; ▌Rich Pezzullo (Republican) 36.4%
New Jersey 7	R+3	Leonard Lance	Republican	2008	Incumbent lost re-election. Democratic gain.	▌ ✓ Tom Malinowski (Democratic) 51.7%; ▌Leonard Lance (Republican) 46.7%; ▌Diane Moxley (Green) 0.8%; ▌Gregg Mele (Independent) 0.7%
New Jersey 8	D+27	Albio Sires	Democratic	2006	Incumbent re-elected.	▌ ✓ Albio Sires (Democratic) 78.1%; ▌John Muniz (Republican) 18.7%
New Jersey 9	D+16	Bill Pascrell	Democratic	1996	Incumbent re-elected.	▌ ✓ Bill Pascrell (Democratic) 70.3%; ▌Eric Fisher (Republican) 28.9%; ▌Claudio Belusic (Independent) 0.8%
New Jersey 10	D+36	Donald Payne Jr.	Democratic	2012 (Special)	Incumbent re-elected.	▌ ✓ Donald Payne Jr. (Democratic) 87.6%; ▌Agha Khan (Republican) 10.1%; ▌Cynthia Johnson (Independent) 1.0%; ▌Joanne Miller (Independent) 1.0%; ▌Scott Dirona (Independent) 0.3%
New Jersey 11	R+3	Rodney Frelinghuysen	Republican	1994	Incumbent retired. Democratic gain.	▌ ✓ Mikie Sherrill (Democratic) 56.8%; ▌Jay Webber (Republican) 42.1%; ▌Robert Crook (Independent) 0.7%; ▌Ryan Martinez (Independent) 0.4%
New Jersey 12	D+16	Bonnie Watson Coleman	Democratic	2014	Incumbent re-elected.	▌ ✓ Bonnie Watson Coleman (Democratic) 68.7%; ▌Daryl Kipnis (Republican) 31.3%

== New Mexico ==
The state congressional delegation changed from 2–1 for Democrats to all 3 seats controlled by Democrats.

District		Incumbent			Results	Candidates
Location	2017 PVI	Representative	Party	First elected	Results	Candidates
New Mexico 1	D+7	Michelle Luján Grisham	Democratic	2012	Incumbent retired to run for Governor of New Mexico. Democratic hold.	▌ ✓ Deb Haaland (Democratic) 59.1%; ▌Janice Arnold-Jones (Republican) 36.3%; ▌Lloyd Princeton (Libertarian) 4.6%
New Mexico 2	R+6	Steve Pearce	Republican	2002; 2008 (retired); 2010	Incumbent retired to run for Governor of New Mexico. Democratic gain.	▌ ✓ Xochitl Torres Small (Democratic) 50.9%; ▌Yvette Herrell (Republican) 49.1%
New Mexico 3	D+8	Ben Ray Luján	Democratic	2008	Incumbent re-elected.	▌ ✓ Ben Ray Luján (Democratic) 63.4%; ▌Jerald Steve McFall (Republican) 31.2%; ▌Christopher Manning (Libertarian) 5.4%

== New York ==
Democrats increased their seat majority in New York's congressional delegation from 18–9 to 21–6.

District		Incumbent			Results	Candidates
Location	2017 PVI	Representative	Party	First elected	Results	Candidates
New York 1	R+5	Lee Zeldin	Republican	2014	Incumbent re-elected.	▌ ✓ Lee Zeldin (Republican) 51.5%; ▌Perry Gershon (Democratic) 47.4%; ▌Kate Browning (Women's Equality) 1.1%
New York 2	R+3	Peter King	Republican	1992	Incumbent re-elected.	▌ ✓ Peter King (Republican) 53.1%; ▌Liuba Grechen Shirley (Democratic) 46.9%
New York 3	D+1	Thomas Suozzi	Democratic	2016	Incumbent re-elected.	▌ ✓ Thomas Suozzi (Democratic) 59.0%; ▌Dan DeBono (Republican) 41.0%
New York 4	D+4	Kathleen Rice	Democratic	2014	Incumbent re-elected.	▌ ✓ Kathleen Rice (Democratic) 61.3%; ▌Ameer Benno (Republican) 38.7%
New York 5	D+37	Gregory Meeks	Democratic	1998	Incumbent re-elected.	▌ ✓ Gregory Meeks (Democratic); Uncontested
New York 6	D+16	Grace Meng	Democratic	2012	Incumbent re-elected.	▌ ✓ Grace Meng (Democratic) 90.9%; ▌Tom Hillgardner (Green) 9.1%
New York 7	D+38	Nydia Velázquez	Democratic	1992	Incumbent re-elected.	▌ ✓ Nydia Velázquez (Democratic) 93.4%; ▌Joseph Lieberman (Conservative) 5.5%; ▌Jeff Kurzon (Reform) 1.1%
New York 8	D+36	Hakeem Jeffries	Democratic	2012	Incumbent re-elected.	▌ ✓ Hakeem Jeffries (Democratic) 94.2%; ▌Ernest Johnson (Conservative) 5.2%; ▌Jessica White (Reform) 0.5%
New York 9	D+34	Yvette Clarke	Democratic	2006	Incumbent re-elected.	▌ ✓ Yvette Clarke (Democratic) 89.3%; ▌Lutchi Gayot (Republican) 10.3%; ▌Joel Anabilah-Azumah (Reform) 0.4%
New York 10	D+26	Jerry Nadler	Democratic	1992	Incumbent re-elected.	▌ ✓ Jerry Nadler (Democratic) 82.1%; ▌Naomi Levin (Republican) 17.9%
New York 11	R+3	Dan Donovan	Republican	2015 (special)	Incumbent lost re-election. Democratic gain.	▌ ✓ Max Rose (Democratic) 53.0%; ▌Dan Donovan (Republican) 46.6%; ▌Henry Bardel (Green) 0.4%
New York 12	D+31	Carolyn Maloney	Democratic	1992	Incumbent re-elected.	▌ ✓ Carolyn Maloney (Democratic) 86.4%; ▌Eliot Rabin (Republican) 12.1%; ▌Scott Hutchins (Green) 1.5%
New York 13	D+43	Adriano Espaillat	Democratic	2016	Incumbent re-elected.	▌ ✓ Adriano Espaillat (Democratic) 94.6%; ▌Jineea Butler (Republican) 5.4%
New York 14	D+29	Joe Crowley	Democratic	1998	Incumbent lost renomination, ran as Working Families nominee, and lost re-election. New member elected. Democratic hold.	▌ ✓ Alexandria Ocasio-Cortez (Democratic) 78.2%; ▌Anthony Pappas (Republican) 13.6%; ▌Joe Crowley (Working Families) 6.6%; ▌Elizabeth Perri (Conservative) 1.6%
New York 15	D+44	José E. Serrano	Democratic	1990	Incumbent re-elected.	▌ ✓ José E. Serrano (Democratic) 96.0%; ▌Jason Gonzalez (Republican) 4.0%
New York 16	D+24	Eliot Engel	Democratic	1988	Incumbent re-elected.	▌ ✓ Eliot Engel (Democratic); Uncontested
New York 17	D+7	Nita Lowey	Democratic	1988	Incumbent re-elected.	▌ ✓ Nita Lowey (Democratic) 88.0%; ▌Joe Ciardullo (Reform) 12.0%
New York 18	R+1	Sean Patrick Maloney	Democratic	2012	Incumbent re-elected.	▌ ✓ Sean Patrick Maloney (Democratic) 55.5%; ▌James O'Donnell (Republican) 44.5%
New York 19	R+2	John Faso	Republican	2016	Incumbent lost re-election. Democratic gain.	▌ ✓ Antonio Delgado (Democratic) 51.4%; ▌John Faso (Republican) 46.2%; ▌Steven Greenfield (Green) 1.5%; ▌Diane Neal (Independent) 1.0%
New York 20	D+7	Paul Tonko	Democratic	2008	Incumbent re-elected.	▌ ✓ Paul Tonko (Democratic) 66.5%; ▌Joe Vitollo (Republican) 33.5%
New York 21	R+4	Elise Stefanik	Republican	2014	Incumbent re-elected.	▌ ✓ Elise Stefanik (Republican) 56.1%; ▌Tedra Cobb (Democratic) 42.4%; ▌Lynn Kahn (Green) 1.5%
New York 22	R+6	Claudia Tenney	Republican	2016	Incumbent lost re-election. Democratic gain.	▌ ✓ Anthony Brindisi (Democratic) 50.9%; ▌Claudia Tenney (Republican) 49.1%
New York 23	R+6	Tom Reed	Republican	2010 (special)	Incumbent re-elected.	▌ ✓ Tom Reed (Republican) 54.2%; ▌Tracy Mitrano (Democratic) 45.8%
New York 24	D+3	John Katko	Republican	2014	Incumbent re-elected.	▌ ✓ John Katko (Republican) 52.6%; ▌Dana Balter (Democratic) 47.4%
New York 25	D+8	Vacant			Incumbent Louise Slaughter died March 16, 2018. Democratic hold. Winner was also elected to fill unexpired term, see above.	▌ ✓ Joseph Morelle (Democratic) 59.0%; ▌Jim Maxwell (Republican) 41.0%
New York 26	D+11	Brian Higgins	Democratic	2004	Incumbent re-elected.	▌ ✓ Brian Higgins (Democratic) 73.3%; ▌Renee Zeno (Republican) 26.7%
New York 27	R+11	Chris Collins	Republican	2012	Incumbent re-elected.	▌ ✓ Chris Collins (Republican) 49.1%; ▌Nate McMurray (Democratic) 48.8%; ▌Larry Piegza (Reform) 2.1%

== North Carolina ==
Due to allegations of electoral fraud, the 116th Congress was sworn in with one seat vacant. On February 21, 2019, a new election was ordered by the state election board.

District		Incumbent			Results	Candidates
Location	2017 PVI	Representative	Party	First elected	Results	Candidates
North Carolina 1	D+17	G. K. Butterfield	Democratic	2004 (special)	Incumbent re-elected.	▌ ✓ G. K. Butterfield (Democratic) 69.8%; ▌Roger Allison (Republican) 30.2%
North Carolina 2	R+7	George Holding	Republican	2012	Incumbent re-elected.	▌ ✓ George Holding (Republican) 51.3%; ▌Linda Coleman (Democratic) 45.8%; ▌Jeff Matemu (Libertarian) 2.9%
North Carolina 3	R+12	Walter B. Jones Jr.	Republican	1994	Incumbent re-elected.	▌ ✓ Walter B. Jones Jr. (Republican); Uncontested
North Carolina 4	D+17	David Price	Democratic	1986; 1994 (defeated); 1996	Incumbent re-elected.	▌ ✓ David Price (Democratic) 72.4%; ▌Steve Von Loor (Republican) 24.0%; ▌Barbara Howe (Libertarian) 3.6%
North Carolina 5	R+10	Virginia Foxx	Republican	2004	Incumbent re-elected.	▌ ✓ Virginia Foxx (Republican) 57.0%; ▌D. D. Adams (Democratic) 43.0%
North Carolina 6	R+9	Mark Walker	Republican	2014	Incumbent re-elected.	▌ ✓ Mark Walker (Republican) 56.5%; ▌Ryan Watts (Democratic) 43.5%
North Carolina 7	R+9	David Rouzer	Republican	2014	Incumbent re-elected.	▌ ✓ David Rouzer (Republican) 55.5%; ▌Kyle Horton (Democratic) 42.8%; ▌David Fallin (Constitution) 1.6%
North Carolina 8	R+8	Richard Hudson	Republican	2012	Incumbent re-elected.	▌ ✓ Richard Hudson (Republican) 55.3%; ▌Frank McNeill (Democratic) 44.7%
North Carolina 9	R+8	Robert Pittenger	Republican	2012	Incumbent lost renomination. Results void and new election ordered. Republican loss.	▌Mark Harris (Republican) 49.3%; ▌Dan McCready (Democratic) 48.9%; ▌Jeff Scott (Libertarian) 1.8%
North Carolina 10	R+12	Patrick McHenry	Republican	2004	Incumbent re-elected.	▌ ✓ Patrick McHenry (Republican) 59.3%; ▌David Brown (Democratic) 40.7%
North Carolina 11	R+14	Mark Meadows	Republican	2012	Incumbent re-elected.	▌ ✓ Mark Meadows (Republican) 59.2%; ▌Phillip Price (Democratic) 38.7%; ▌Clifton Ingram (Libertarian) 2.0%
North Carolina 12	D+18	Alma Adams	Democratic	2014	Incumbent re-elected.	▌ ✓ Alma Adams (Democratic) 73.1%; ▌Paul Wright (Republican) 26.9%
North Carolina 13	R+6	Ted Budd	Republican	2016	Incumbent re-elected.	▌ ✓ Ted Budd (Republican) 51.5%; ▌Kathy Manning (Democratic) 45.5%; ▌Tom Bailey (Libertarian) 2.0%

== North Dakota ==
Republicans maintained control of the sole house seat.

District		Incumbent			Results	Candidates
Location	2017 PVI	Representative	Party	First elected	Results	Candidates
North Dakota at-large	R+16	Kevin Cramer	Republican	2012	Incumbent retired to run for U.S. Senator. Republican hold.	▌ ✓ Kelly Armstrong (Republican) 60.3%; ▌Mac Schneider (Democratic-NPL) 35.6%; ▌Charles Tuttle (Independent) 4.1%

== Ohio ==
The state congressional delegation remained the same at 12–4 for Republicans.

District		Incumbent			Results	Candidates
Location	2017 PVI	Representative	Party	First elected	Results	Candidates
Ohio 1	R+5	Steve Chabot	Republican	1994; 2008 (defeated); 2010	Incumbent re-elected.	▌ ✓ Steve Chabot (Republican) 51.3%; ▌Aftab Pureval (Democratic) 46.9%; ▌Dirk Kubala (Libertarian) 1.8%
Ohio 2	R+9	Brad Wenstrup	Republican	2012	Incumbent re-elected.	▌ ✓ Brad Wenstrup (Republican) 57.6%; ▌Jill Schiller (Democratic) 41.2%; ▌James Condit (Green) 1.2%
Ohio 3	D+19	Joyce Beatty	Democratic	2012	Incumbent re-elected.	▌ ✓ Joyce Beatty (Democratic) 73.6%; ▌James Burgess (Republican) 26.4%
Ohio 4	R+14	Jim Jordan	Republican	2006	Incumbent re-elected.	▌ ✓ Jim Jordan (Republican) 65.3%; ▌Janet Garrett (Democratic) 34.7%
Ohio 5	R+11	Bob Latta	Republican	2006	Incumbent re-elected.	▌ ✓ Bob Latta (Republican) 62.3%; ▌Michael Galbraith (Democratic) 35.1%; ▌Don Kissick (Libertarian) 2.6%
Ohio 6	R+16	Bill Johnson	Republican	2010	Incumbent re-elected.	▌ ✓ Bill Johnson (Republican) 69.3%; ▌Shawna Roberts (Democratic) 30.7%
Ohio 7	R+12	Bob Gibbs	Republican	2010	Incumbent re-elected.	▌ ✓ Bob Gibbs (Republican) 58.7%; ▌Ken Harbaugh (Democratic) 41.3%
Ohio 8	R+17	Warren Davidson	Republican	2016 (special)	Incumbent re-elected.	▌ ✓ Warren Davidson (Republican) 66.6%; ▌Vanessa Enoch (Democratic) 33.4%
Ohio 9	D+14	Marcy Kaptur	Democratic	1982	Incumbent re-elected.	▌ ✓ Marcy Kaptur (Democratic) 67.8%; ▌Steve Kraus (Republican) 32.2%
Ohio 10	R+4	Mike Turner	Republican	2002	Incumbent re-elected.	▌ ✓ Mike Turner (Republican) 55.9%; ▌Theresa Gasper (Democratic) 42.2%; ▌David Harlow (Libertarian) 1.9%
Ohio 11	D+32	Marcia Fudge	Democratic	2006	Incumbent re-elected.	▌ ✓ Marcia Fudge (Democratic) 82.2%; ▌Beverly Goldstein (Republican) 17.8%
Ohio 12	R+7	Troy Balderson	Republican	2018 (special)	Incumbent re-elected.	▌ ✓ Troy Balderson (Republican) 51.4%; ▌Danny O'Connor (Democratic) 47.2%; ▌Joseph Manchik (Green) 1.4%
Ohio 13	D+7	Tim Ryan	Democratic	2002	Incumbent re-elected.	▌ ✓ Tim Ryan (Democratic) 61.0%; ▌Chris DePizzo (Republican) 39.0%
Ohio 14	R+5	David Joyce	Republican	2012	Incumbent re-elected.	▌ ✓ David Joyce (Republican) 55.2%; ▌Betsy Rader (Democratic) 44.8%
Ohio 15	R+7	Steve Stivers	Republican	2010	Incumbent re-elected.	▌ ✓ Steve Stivers (Republican) 58.3%; ▌Rick Neal (Democratic) 39.7%; ▌Johnathan Miller (Libertarian) 2.0% (Note: The Libertarian Party does not have ballot access in Ohio or Tennessee. Therefore, Libertarian candidates Johnathan Miller (Ohio's 15th district), Greg Samples (Tennessee's 2nd district), and David Ross (Tennessee's 6th district) appear on their ballots as "Independents.")
Ohio 16	R+8	Jim Renacci	Republican	2010	Incumbent retired to run for U.S. Senator. Republican hold.	▌ ✓ Anthony Gonzalez (Republican) 56.7%; ▌Susan Moran Palmer (Democratic) 43.3%

== Oklahoma ==
The state congressional delegation changed from 5–0 for Republicans to a 4–1 Republican majority.

District		Incumbent			Results	Candidates
Location	2017 PVI	Representative	Party	First elected	Results	Candidates
Oklahoma 1	R+17	Vacant			Jim Bridenstine (R) resigned April 23, 2018 to become NASA Administrator. Republican hold. Winner appointed November 13, 2018.	▌ ✓ Kevin Hern (Republican) 59.3%; ▌Tim Gilpin (Democratic) 40.7%
Oklahoma 2	R+24	Markwayne Mullin	Republican	2012	Incumbent re-elected.	▌ ✓ Markwayne Mullin (Republican) 65.0%; ▌Jason Nichols (Democratic) 30.1%; ▌John Foreman (Independent) 3.0%; ▌Richard Castaldo (Libertarian) 1.9%
Oklahoma 3	R+27	Frank Lucas	Republican	1994	Incumbent re-elected.	▌ ✓ Frank Lucas (Republican) 73.9%; ▌Frankie Robbins (Democratic) 26.1%
Oklahoma 4	R+20	Tom Cole	Republican	2002	Incumbent re-elected.	▌ ✓ Tom Cole (Republican) 63.1%; ▌Mary Brannon (Democratic) 33.0%; ▌Ruby Peters (Independent) 3.9%
Oklahoma 5	R+10	Steve Russell	Republican	2014	Incumbent lost re-election. Democratic gain.	▌ ✓ Kendra Horn (Democratic) 50.7%; ▌Steve Russell (Republican) 49.3%

== Oregon ==
The state congressional delegation remained the same, with a 4–1 Democratic majority.

District		Incumbent			Results	Candidates
Location	2017 PVI	Representative	Party	First elected	Results	Candidates
Oregon 1	D+9	Suzanne Bonamici	Democratic	2012 (special)	Incumbent re-elected.	▌ ✓ Suzanne Bonamici (Democratic) 63.7%; ▌John Verbeek (Republican) 32.1%; ▌Drew Layda (Pacific Green) 4.2%
Oregon 2	R+11	Greg Walden	Republican	1998	Incumbent re-elected.	▌ ✓ Greg Walden (Republican) 56.3%; ▌Jamie McLeod-Skinner (Democratic) 39.4%; ▌Mark Roberts (Independent) 4.2%
Oregon 3	D+24	Earl Blumenauer	Democratic	1996	Incumbent re-elected.	▌ ✓ Earl Blumenauer (Democratic) 72.7%; ▌Tom Harrison (Republican) 19.9%; ▌Marc Koller (Independent) 5.5%; ▌Gary Dye (Libertarian) 1.5%; ▌Michael Marsh (Constitution) 0.4%
Oregon 4	EVEN	Peter DeFazio	Democratic	1986	Incumbent re-elected.	▌ ✓ Peter DeFazio (Democratic) 56.0%; ▌Art Robinson (Republican) 40.9%; ▌Mike Beilstein (Pacific Green) 1.6%; ▌Richard Johnson (Libertarian) 1.4%
Oregon 5	EVEN	Kurt Schrader	Democratic	2008	Incumbent re-elected.	▌ ✓ Kurt Schrader (Democratic) 55.1%; ▌Mark Callahan (Republican) 41.9%; ▌Dan Souza (Libertarian) 1.7%; ▌Marvin Sandnes (Pacific Green) 1.3%

== Pennsylvania ==
As a result of changes in the congressional map, the state congressional delegation changed from a 13–5 Republican majority to a 9–9 split.

District		Incumbent			Results	Candidates
Location	2017 PVI	Representative	Party	First elected	Results	Candidates
Pennsylvania 1	R+1	Brian Fitzpatrick; Redistricted from the 8th district	Republican	2016	Incumbent re-elected.	▌ ✓ Brian Fitzpatrick (Republican) 51.3%; ▌Scott Wallace (Democratic) 48.7%
Pennsylvania 2	D+25	Brendan Boyle; Redistricted from the 13th district	Democratic	2014	Incumbent re-elected.	▌ ✓ Brendan Boyle (Democratic) 79.0%; ▌David Torres (Republican) 21.0%
Pennsylvania 2	D+25	Bob Brady; Redistricted from the 1st district	Democratic	1998 (special)	Incumbent retired. Democratic loss.	▌ ✓ Brendan Boyle (Democratic) 79.0%; ▌David Torres (Republican) 21.0%
Pennsylvania 3	D+41	Dwight Evans; Redistricted from the 2nd district	Democratic	2016	Incumbent re-elected.	▌ ✓ Dwight Evans (Democratic) 93.4%; ▌Bryan Leib (Republican) 6.6%
Pennsylvania 4	D+7	None (New seat)			New seat. Democratic gain.	▌ ✓ Madeleine Dean (Democratic) 63.5%; ▌Dan David (Republican) 36.5%
Pennsylvania 5	D+13	Vacant			Pat Meehan (R) resigned April 27, 2018, after being redistricted from the 7th district. Democratic gain. Winner was also elected to fill unexpired term, see above.	▌ ✓ Mary Gay Scanlon (Democratic) 65.2%; ▌Pearl Kim (Republican) 34.8%
Pennsylvania 6	D+2	Ryan Costello	Republican	2014	Incumbent retired. Democratic gain.	▌ ✓ Chrissy Houlahan (Democratic) 58.9%; ▌Greg McCauley (Republican) 41.1%
Pennsylvania 7	D+1	Vacant			Charlie Dent (R) resigned May 12, 2018, after being redistricted from the 15th district. Democratic gain. Winner was also elected to fill unexpired term, see above.	▌ ✓ Susan Wild (Democratic) 53.5%; ▌Marty Nothstein (Republican) 43.5%; ▌Tom Silfies (Libertarian) 3.0%
Pennsylvania 8	R+1	Matt Cartwright; Redistricted from the 17th district	Democratic	2012	Incumbent re-elected.	▌ ✓ Matt Cartwright (Democratic) 54.6%; ▌John Chrin (Republican) 45.4%
Pennsylvania 9	R+14	Lou Barletta; Redistricted from the 11th district	Republican	2010	Incumbent retired to run for U.S. Senator. Republican hold.	▌ ✓ Dan Meuser (Republican) 59.7%; ▌Denny Wolff (Democratic) 40.3%
Pennsylvania 10	R+6	Scott Perry; Redistricted from the 4th district	Republican	2012	Incumbent re-elected.	▌ ✓ Scott Perry (Republican) 51.3%; ▌George Scott (Democratic) 48.7%
Pennsylvania 11	R+14	Lloyd Smucker; Redistricted from the 16th district	Republican	2016	Incumbent re-elected.	▌ ✓ Lloyd Smucker (Republican) 59.0%; ▌Jess King (Democratic) 41.0%
Pennsylvania 12	R+17	Tom Marino; Redistricted from the 10th district	Republican	2010	Incumbent re-elected.	▌ ✓ Tom Marino (Republican) 66.0%; ▌Marc Friedenberg (Democratic) 34.0%
Pennsylvania 13	R+22	Bill Shuster; Redistricted from the 9th district	Republican	2001 (special)	Incumbent retired. Republican hold.	▌ ✓ John Joyce (Republican) 70.5%; ▌Brent Ottaway (Democratic) 29.5%
Pennsylvania 14	R+14	None (New seat)			New seat. Republican gain.	▌ ✓ Guy Reschenthaler (Republican) 57.9%; ▌Bibiana Boerio (Democratic) 42.1%
Pennsylvania 15	R+20	Glenn Thompson; Redistricted from the 5th district	Republican	2008	Incumbent re-elected.	▌ ✓ Glenn Thompson (Republican) 67.8%; ▌Susan Boser (Democratic) 32.2%
Pennsylvania 16	R+8	Mike Kelly; Redistricted from the 3rd district	Republican	2010	Incumbent re-elected.	▌ ✓ Mike Kelly (Republican) 51.6%; ▌Ron DiNicola (Democratic) 47.3%; ▌Bill Beeman (Libertarian) 1.1%
Pennsylvania 17	R+3	Conor Lamb; Redistricted from the 18th district	Democratic	2018 (special)	Incumbent re-elected.	▌ ✓ Conor Lamb (Democratic) 56.3%; ▌Keith Rothfus (Republican) 43.7%
Pennsylvania 17	R+3	Keith Rothfus; Redistricted from the 12th district	Republican	2012	Incumbent lost re-election. Republican loss.	▌ ✓ Conor Lamb (Democratic) 56.3%; ▌Keith Rothfus (Republican) 43.7%
Pennsylvania 18	D+13	Mike Doyle; Redistricted from the 14th district	Democratic	1994	Incumbent re-elected.	▌ ✓ Mike Doyle (Democratic) 100%

== Rhode Island ==
The state congressional delegation remained unchanged at 2–0 for Democrats.

District		Incumbent			Results	Candidates
Location	2017 PVI	Representative	Party	First elected	Results	Candidates
Rhode Island 1	D+16	David Cicilline	Democratic	2010	Incumbent re-elected.	▌ ✓ David Cicilline (Democratic) 66.9%; ▌Patrick Donovan (Republican) 33.1%
Rhode Island 2	D+6	James Langevin	Democratic	2000	Incumbent re-elected.	▌ ✓ James Langevin (Democratic) 63.6%; ▌Sal Caiozzo (Republican) 36.4%

== South Carolina ==
The state congressional delegation changed from 6–1 for Republicans to 5–2 for Republicans.

District		Incumbent			Results	Candidates
Location	2017 PVI	Representative	Party	First elected	Results	Candidates
South Carolina 1	R+10	Mark Sanford	Republican	1994; 2000 (retired); 2013 (special)	Incumbent lost renomination. Democratic gain.	▌ ✓ Joe Cunningham (Democratic) 50.7%; ▌Katie Arrington (Republican) 49.3%
South Carolina 2	R+12	Joe Wilson	Republican	2001 (special)	Incumbent re-elected.	▌ ✓ Joe Wilson (Republican) 56.3%; ▌Sean Carrigan (Democratic) 42.5%; ▌Sonny Narang (American) 1.2%
South Carolina 3	R+19	Jeff Duncan	Republican	2010	Incumbent re-elected.	▌ ✓ Jeff Duncan (Republican) 67.8%; ▌Mary Geren (Democratic) 31.0%; ▌Dave Moore (American) 1.2%
South Carolina 4	R+15	Trey Gowdy	Republican	2010	Incumbent retired. Republican hold.	▌ ✓ William Timmons (Republican) 59.6%; ▌Brandon Brown (Democratic) 36.6%; ▌Guy Furay (American) 3.8%
South Carolina 5	R+9	Ralph Norman	Republican	2017 (special)	Incumbent re-elected.	▌ ✓ Ralph Norman (Republican) 57.1%; ▌Archie Parnell (Democratic) 41.5%; ▌Michael Chandler (Constitution) 1.4%
South Carolina 6	D+19	Jim Clyburn	Democratic	1992	Incumbent re-elected.	▌ ✓ Jim Clyburn (Democratic) 70.2%; ▌Gerhard Gressmann (Republican) 28.3%; ▌Bryan Pugh (Green) 1.5%
South Carolina 7	R+9	Tom Rice	Republican	2012	Incumbent re-elected.	▌ ✓ Tom Rice (Republican) 59.6%; ▌Robert Williams (Democratic) 40.4%

== South Dakota ==
Republicans retained control of the sole seat in the state.

District		Incumbent			Results	Candidates
Location	2017 PVI	Representative	Party	First elected	Results	Candidates
South Dakota at-large	R+14	Kristi Noem	Republican	2010	Incumbent retired to run for Governor of South Dakota. Republican hold.	▌ ✓ Dusty Johnson (Republican) 60.3%; ▌Tim Bjorkman (Democratic) 36.0%; ▌Ron Wieczorek (Independent) 2.2%; ▌George Hendrickson (Libertarian) 1.5%

== Tennessee ==
Republicans maintained their 7-2 seat majority.

District		Incumbent			Results	Candidates
Location	2017 PVI	Representative	Party	First elected	Results	Candidates
Tennessee 1	R+28	Phil Roe	Republican	2008	Incumbent re-elected.	▌ ✓ Phil Roe (Republican) 77.1%; ▌Marty Olsen (Democratic) 21.0%; ▌Michael Salyer (Independent) 1.9%
Tennessee 2	R+20	Jimmy Duncan	Republican	1988 (special)	Incumbent retired. Republican hold.	▌ ✓ Tim Burchett (Republican) 65.9%; ▌Renee Hoyos (Democratic) 33.1%; Others: ▌Greg Samples (Libertarian) 0.4%; ▌Jeffrey Grunau (Independent) 0.3%; ▌Marc Whitmire (Independent) 0.2%; ▌Keith LaTorre (Independent) 0.1%
Tennessee 3	R+18	Chuck Fleischmann	Republican	2010	Incumbent re-elected.	▌ ✓ Chuck Fleischmann (Republican) 63.7%; ▌Danielle Mitchell (Democratic) 34.5%; ▌Rick Tyler (Independent) 1.8%
Tennessee 4	R+20	Scott DesJarlais	Republican	2010	Incumbent re-elected.	▌ ✓ Scott DesJarlais (Republican) 63.4%; ▌Mariah Phillips (Democratic) 33.6%; ▌Michael Shupe (Independent) 3.0%
Tennessee 5	D+7	Jim Cooper	Democratic	1982; 1994 (retired); 2002	Incumbent re-elected.	▌ ✓ Jim Cooper (Democratic) 67.8%; ▌Jody Ball (Republican) 32.2%
Tennessee 6	R+24	Diane Black	Republican	2010	Incumbent retired to run for Governor of Tennessee. Republican hold.	▌ ✓ John Rose (Republican) 69.5%; ▌Dawn Barlow (Democratic) 28.3%; ▌David Ross (Libertarian) 1.4%; ▌Lloyd Dunn (Independent) 0.9%
Tennessee 7	R+20	Marsha Blackburn	Republican	2002	Incumbent retired to run for U.S. Senator. Republican hold.	▌ ✓ Mark Green (Republican) 66.9%; ▌Justin Kanew (Democratic) 32.1%; Others: ▌Lenny Ladner (Independent) 0.6%; ▌Brent Legendre (Independent) 0.4%
Tennessee 8	R+19	David Kustoff	Republican	2016	Incumbent re-elected.	▌ ✓ David Kustoff (Republican) 67.7%; ▌Erika Stotts Pearson (Democratic) 30.1%; ▌James Hart (Independent) 2.2%
Tennessee 9	D+28	Steve Cohen	Democratic	2006	Incumbent re-elected.	▌ ✓ Steve Cohen (Democratic) 80.0%; ▌Charlotte Bergmann (Republican) 19.2%; ▌Leo AwGoWhat (Independent) 0.8%

== Texas ==
The state congressional delegation changed from a 25–11 Republican majority to a 23–13 Republican majority.

District		Incumbent			Results	Candidates
Location	2017 PVI	Representative	Party	First elected	Results	Candidates
Texas 1	R+25	Louie Gohmert	Republican	2004	Incumbent re-elected.	▌ ✓ Louie Gohmert (Republican) 72.3%; ▌Shirley McKellar (Democratic) 26.3%; ▌Jeff Callaway (Libertarian) 1.4%
Texas 2	R+11	Ted Poe	Republican	2004	Incumbent retired. Republican hold.	▌ ✓ Dan Crenshaw (Republican) 52.8%; ▌Todd Litton (Democratic) 45.6%; ▌Patrick Gunnels (Libertarian) 0.9%; ▌Scott Cubbler (Independent) 0.7%
Texas 3	R+13	Sam Johnson	Republican	1991 (special)	Incumbent retired. Republican hold.	▌ ✓ Van Taylor (Republican) 54.3%; ▌Lorie Burch (Democratic) 44.3%; ▌Christopher Claytor (Libertarian) 1.4%
Texas 4	R+28	John Ratcliffe	Republican	2014	Incumbent re-elected.	▌ ✓ John Ratcliffe (Republican) 75.7%; ▌Catherine Krantz (Democratic) 23.0%; ▌Ken Ashby (Libertarian) 1.3%
Texas 5	R+16	Jeb Hensarling	Republican	2002	Incumbent retired. Republican hold.	▌ ✓ Lance Gooden (Republican) 62.4%; ▌Dan Wood (Democratic) 37.6%
Texas 6	R+9	Joe Barton	Republican	1984	Incumbent retired. Republican hold.	▌ ✓ Ron Wright (Republican) 53.1%; ▌Jana Lynne Sanchez (Democratic) 45.4%; ▌Jason Allen Harber (Libertarian) 1.5%
Texas 7	R+7	John Culberson	Republican	2000	Incumbent lost re-election. Democratic gain.	▌ ✓ Lizzie Fletcher (Democratic) 52.5%; ▌John Culberson (Republican) 47.5%
Texas 8	R+28	Kevin Brady	Republican	1996	Incumbent re-elected.	▌ ✓ Kevin Brady (Republican) 73.4%; ▌Steven David (Democratic) 24.9%; ▌Chris Duncan (Libertarian) 1.7%
Texas 9	D+29	Al Green	Democratic	2004	Incumbent re-elected.	▌ ✓ Al Green (Democratic) 89.1%; ▌Phil Kurtz (Libertarian) 3.9%; ▌Benjamin Hernandez (Independent) 3.8%; ▌Kesha Rogers (Independent) 3.3%
Texas 10	R+9	Michael McCaul	Republican	2004	Incumbent re-elected.	▌ ✓ Michael McCaul (Republican) 51.1%; ▌Mike Siegel (Democratic) 46.8%; ▌Mike Ryan (Libertarian) 2.1%
Texas 11	R+32	Mike Conaway	Republican	2004	Incumbent re-elected.	▌ ✓ Mike Conaway (Republican) 80.1%; ▌Jennie Lou Leeder (Democratic) 18.4%; ▌Rhett Rosenquest Smith (Libertarian) 1.5%
Texas 12	R+18	Kay Granger	Republican	1996	Incumbent re-elected.	▌ ✓ Kay Granger (Republican) 64.3%; ▌Vanessa Adia (Democratic) 33.9%; ▌Jacob Leddy (Libertarian) 1.8%
Texas 13	R+33	Mac Thornberry	Republican	1994	Incumbent re-elected.	▌ ✓ Mac Thornberry (Republican) 81.5%; ▌Greg Sagan (Democratic) 16.9%; ▌Calvin DeWeese (Libertarian) 1.6%
Texas 14	R+12	Randy Weber	Republican	2012	Incumbent re-elected.	▌ ✓ Randy Weber (Republican) 59.2%; ▌Adrienne Bell (Democratic) 39.3%; ▌Don Conley (Libertarian) 1.4%
Texas 15	D+7	Vicente Gonzalez	Democratic	2016	Incumbent re-elected.	▌ ✓ Vicente Gonzalez (Democratic) 59.7%; ▌Tim Westley (Republican) 38.8%; ▌Anthony Cristo (Libertarian) 1.5%
Texas 16	D+17	Beto O'Rourke	Democratic	2012	Incumbent retired to run for U.S. Senator. Democratic hold.	▌ ✓ Veronica Escobar (Democratic) 68.5%; ▌Rick Seeberger (Republican) 27.0%; ▌Ben Mendoza (Independent) 1.6%
Texas 17	R+12	Bill Flores	Republican	2010	Incumbent re-elected.	▌ ✓ Bill Flores (Republican) 56.8%; ▌Rick Kennedy (Democratic) 41.3%; ▌Peter Churchman (Libertarian) 1.9%
Texas 18	D+27	Sheila Jackson Lee	Democratic	1994	Incumbent re-elected.	▌ ✓ Sheila Jackson Lee (Democratic) 75.2%; ▌Ava Pate (Republican) 20.8%; ▌Luke Spencer (Libertarian) 2.2%
Texas 19	R+27	Jodey Arrington	Republican	2016	Incumbent re-elected.	▌ ✓ Jodey Arrington (Republican) 75.2%; ▌Miguel Levario (Democratic) 24.8%
Texas 20	D+10	Joaquin Castro	Democratic	2012	Incumbent re-elected.	▌ ✓ Joaquin Castro (Democratic) 80.9%; ▌Jeffrey C. Blunt (Libertarian) 19.1%
Texas 21	R+10	Lamar Smith	Republican	1986	Incumbent retired. Republican hold.	▌ ✓ Chip Roy (Republican) 50.2%; ▌Joseph Kopser (Democratic) 47.6%; ▌Lee Santos (Libertarian) 2.1%
Texas 22	R+10	Pete Olson	Republican	2008	Incumbent re-elected.	▌ ✓ Pete Olson (Republican) 51.4%; ▌Sri Preston Kulkarni (Democratic) 46.5%; ▌John McElligott (Libertarian) 1.1%; ▌Kellen Sweny (Independent) 1.1%
Texas 23	R+1	Will Hurd	Republican	2014	Incumbent re-elected.	▌ ✓ Will Hurd (Republican) 49.2%; ▌Gina Ortiz Jones (Democratic) 48.7%; ▌Ruben Corvalan (Libertarian) 2.1%
Texas 24	R+9	Kenny Marchant	Republican	2004	Incumbent re-elected.	▌ ✓ Kenny Marchant (Republican) 50.6%; ▌Jan McDowell (Democratic) 47.5%; ▌Mike Kolls (Libertarian) 1.8%
Texas 25	R+11	Roger Williams	Republican	2012	Incumbent re-elected.	▌ ✓ Roger Williams (Republican) 53.5%; ▌Julie Oliver (Democratic) 44.8%; ▌Desarae Lindsey (Libertarian) 1.7%
Texas 26	R+18	Michael C. Burgess	Republican	2002	Incumbent re-elected.	▌ ✓ Michael C. Burgess (Republican) 59.4%; ▌Linsey Fagan (Democratic) 39.0%; ▌Mark Boler (Libertarian) 1.6%
Texas 27	R+13	Michael Cloud	Republican	2018 (special)	Incumbent re-elected.	▌ ✓ Michael Cloud (Republican) 60.3%; ▌Eric Holguin (Democratic) 36.6%; ▌James Duerr (Independent) 2.1%; ▌Daniel Tinus (Libertarian) 1.0%
Texas 28	D+9	Henry Cuellar	Democratic	2004	Incumbent re-elected.	▌ ✓ Henry Cuellar (Democratic) 84.4%; ▌Arthur Thomas (Libertarian) 15.6%
Texas 29	D+19	Gene Green	Democratic	1992	Incumbent retired. Democratic hold.	▌ ✓ Sylvia Garcia (Democratic) 75.1%; ▌Phillip Aronoff (Republican) 23.9%; ▌Cullen Burns (Libertarian) 1.0%
Texas 30	D+29	Eddie Bernice Johnson	Democratic	1992	Incumbent re-elected.	▌ ✓ Eddie Bernice Johnson (Democratic) 91.1%; ▌Shawn Jones (Libertarian) 8.9%
Texas 31	R+10	John Carter	Republican	2002	Incumbent re-elected.	▌ ✓ John Carter (Republican) 50.6%; ▌MJ Hegar (Democratic) 47.7%; ▌Jason Hope (Libertarian) 1.7%
Texas 32	R+5	Pete Sessions	Republican	1996	Incumbent lost re-election. Democratic gain.	▌ ✓ Colin Allred (Democratic) 52.3%; ▌Pete Sessions (Republican) 45.8%; ▌Melina Baker (Libertarian) 2.0%
Texas 33	D+23	Marc Veasey	Democratic	2012	Incumbent re-elected.	▌ ✓ Marc Veasey (Democratic) 76.2%; ▌Willie Billups (Republican) 21.9%; ▌Jason Reeves (Libertarian) 1.9%
Texas 34	D+10	Filemon Vela Jr.	Democratic	2012	Incumbent re-elected.	▌ ✓ Filemon Vela Jr. (Democratic) 60.0%; ▌Rey Gonzalez (Republican) 40.0%
Texas 35	D+15	Lloyd Doggett	Democratic	1994	Incumbent re-elected.	▌ ✓ Lloyd Doggett (Democratic) 71.3%; ▌David Smalling (Republican) 26.0%; ▌Clark Patterson (Libertarian) 2.7%
Texas 36	R+26	Brian Babin	Republican	2014	Incumbent re-elected.	▌ ✓ Brian Babin (Republican) 72.6%; ▌Dayna Steele (Democratic) 27.4%

== Utah ==
The state congressional delegation changed from 4–0 for Republicans to a 3–1 Republican majority.

District		Incumbent			Results	Candidates
Location	2017 PVI	Representative	Party	First elected	Results	Candidates
Utah 1	R+26	Rob Bishop	Republican	2002	Incumbent re-elected.	▌ ✓ Rob Bishop (Republican) 61.6%; ▌Lee Castillo (Democratic) 24.9%; ▌Eric Eliason (United Utah) 11.6%; ▌Adam Davis (Green) 1.9%
Utah 2	R+16	Chris Stewart	Republican	2012	Incumbent re-elected.	▌ ✓ Chris Stewart (Republican) 56.1%; ▌Shireen Ghorbani (Democratic) 38.9%; ▌Jeffrey Whipple (Libertarian) 4.0%
Utah 3	R+25	John Curtis	Republican	2017 (special)	Incumbent re-elected.	▌ ✓ John Curtis (Republican) 67.5%; ▌James Singer (Democratic) 27.3%; ▌Gregory Duerden (Independent American) 2.6%; ▌Timothy Zeidner (United Utah) 2.6%
Utah 4	R+13	Mia Love	Republican	2014	Incumbent lost re-election. Democratic gain.	▌ ✓ Ben McAdams (Democratic) 50.1%; ▌Mia Love (Republican) 49.9%

== Vermont ==
The Democrats maintained control of the sole seat in the state.

District		Incumbent			Results	Candidates
Location	2017 PVI	Representative	Party	First elected	Results	Candidates
Vermont at-large	D+15	Peter Welch	Democratic	2006	Incumbent re-elected.	▌ ✓ Peter Welch (Democratic) 69.2%; ▌Anya Tynio (Republican) 26.0%; ▌Cris Ericson (Independent) 3.3%; ▌Laura Potter (Liberty Union) 1.4%

== Virginia ==
The state congressional delegation flipped from a 7–4 Republican majority to a 7–4 Democratic majority.

District		Incumbent			Results	Candidates
Location	2017 PVI	Representative	Party	First elected	Results	Candidates
Virginia 1	R+8	Rob Wittman	Republican	2007 (special)	Incumbent re-elected.	▌ ✓ Rob Wittman (Republican) 55.2%; ▌Vangie Williams (Democratic) 44.8%
Virginia 2	R+3	Scott Taylor	Republican	2016	Incumbent lost re-election. Democratic gain.	▌ ✓ Elaine Luria (Democratic) 51.1%; ▌Scott Taylor (Republican) 48.9%
Virginia 3	D+16	Bobby Scott	Democratic	1992	Incumbent re-elected.	▌ ✓ Bobby Scott (Democratic) 91.2%
Virginia 4	D+10	Donald McEachin	Democratic	2016	Incumbent re-elected.	▌ ✓ Donald McEachin (Democratic) 62.6%; ▌Ryan McAdams (Republican) 36.0%; ▌Pete Wells (Libertarian) 1.4%
Virginia 5	R+6	Tom Garrett	Republican	2016	Incumbent retired. Republican hold.	▌ ✓ Denver Riggleman (Republican) 53.3%; ▌Leslie Cockburn (Democratic) 46.7%
Virginia 6	R+13	Bob Goodlatte	Republican	1992	Incumbent retired. Republican hold.	▌ ✓ Ben Cline (Republican) 59.8%; ▌Jennifer Lewis (Democratic) 40.2%
Virginia 7	R+6	Dave Brat	Republican	2014	Incumbent lost re-election. Democratic gain.	▌ ✓ Abigail Spanberger (Democratic) 50.4%; ▌Dave Brat (Republican) 48.4%; ▌Joe Walton (Libertarian) 1.2%
Virginia 8	D+21	Don Beyer	Democratic	2014	Incumbent re-elected.	▌ ✓ Don Beyer (Democratic) 76.3%; ▌Thomas Oh (Republican) 23.7%
Virginia 9	R+19	Morgan Griffith	Republican	2010	Incumbent re-elected.	▌ ✓ Morgan Griffith (Republican) 65.2%; ▌Anthony Flaccavento (Democratic) 34.8%
Virginia 10	D+1	Barbara Comstock	Republican	2014	Incumbent lost re-election. New member elected. Democratic gain.	▌ ✓ Jennifer Wexton (Democratic) 56.2%; ▌Barbara Comstock (Republican) 43.8%
Virginia 11	D+15	Gerry Connolly	Democratic	2008	Incumbent re-elected.	▌ ✓ Gerry Connolly (Democratic) 71.2%; ▌Jeff Dove (Republican) 27.0%; ▌Stevan Porter (Libertarian) 1.8%

== Washington ==
Democrats increased their seat majority from 6–4 to 7–3.

District		Incumbent			Results	Candidates
Location	2017 PVI	Representative	Party	First elected	Results	Candidates
Washington 1	D+6	Suzan DelBene	Democratic	2012	Incumbent re-elected.	▌ ✓ Suzan DelBene (Democratic) 59.3%; ▌Jeffrey Beeler (Republican) 40.7%
Washington 2	D+10	Rick Larsen	Democratic	2000	Incumbent re-elected.	▌ ✓ Rick Larsen (Democratic) 71.3%; ▌Brian Luke (Libertarian) 28.7%
Washington 3	R+4	Jaime Herrera Beutler	Republican	2010	Incumbent re-elected.	▌ ✓ Jaime Herrera Beutler (Republican) 52.7%; ▌Carolyn Long (Democratic) 47.3%
Washington 4	R+13	Dan Newhouse	Republican	2014	Incumbent re-elected.	▌ ✓ Dan Newhouse (Republican) 62.8%; ▌Christine Brown (Democratic) 37.2%
Washington 5	R+8	Cathy McMorris Rodgers	Republican	2004	Incumbent re-elected.	▌ ✓ Cathy McMorris Rodgers (Republican) 54.8%; ▌Lisa Brown (Democratic) 45.2%
Washington 6	D+6	Derek Kilmer	Democratic	2012	Incumbent re-elected.	▌ ✓ Derek Kilmer (Democratic) 63.9%; ▌Douglas Dightman (Republican) 36.1%
Washington 7	D+33	Pramila Jayapal	Democratic	2016	Incumbent re-elected.	▌ ✓ Pramila Jayapal (Democratic) 83.6%; ▌Craig Keller (Republican) 16.4%
Washington 8	EVEN	Dave Reichert	Republican	2004	Incumbent retired. Democratic gain.	▌ ✓ Kim Schrier (Democratic) 52.4%; ▌Dino Rossi (Republican) 47.6%
Washington 9	D+21	Adam Smith	Democratic	1996	Incumbent re-elected.	▌ ✓ Adam Smith (Democratic) 67.9%; ▌Sarah Smith (Democratic) 32.1%
Washington 10	D+5	Denny Heck	Democratic	2012	Incumbent re-elected.	▌ ✓ Denny Heck (Democratic) 61.5%; ▌Joseph Brumbles (Republican) 38.5%

== West Virginia ==
The state congressional delegation remained the same at 3–0 for Republicans.

District		Incumbent			Results	Candidates
Location	2017 PVI	Representative	Party	First elected	Results	Candidates
West Virginia 1	R+19	David McKinley	Republican	2010	Incumbent re-elected.	▌ ✓ David McKinley (Republican) 64.6%; ▌Kendra Fershee (Democratic) 35.4%
West Virginia 2	R+17	Alex Mooney	Republican	2014	Incumbent re-elected.	▌ ✓ Alex Mooney (Republican) 54.0%; ▌Talley Sergent (Democratic) 43.0%; ▌Daniel Lutz (Mountain) 3.1%
West Virginia 3	R+23	Vacant			Evan Jenkins (R) resigned September 30, 2018 to join the West Virginia Supreme Court of Appeals. Republican hold.	▌ ✓ Carol Miller (Republican) 56.4%; ▌Richard Ojeda (Democratic) 43.6%

== Wisconsin ==
Republicans maintained their 5-3 seat majority.

District		Incumbent			Results	Candidates
Location	2017 PVI	Representative	Party	First elected	Results	Candidates
Wisconsin 1	R+5	Paul Ryan	Republican	1998	Incumbent retired. Republican hold.	▌ ✓ Bryan Steil (Republican) 54.6%; ▌Randy Bryce (Democratic) 42.3%; ▌Ken Yorgan (Independent) 3.1%
Wisconsin 2	D+18	Mark Pocan	Democratic	2012	Incumbent re-elected.	▌ ✓ Mark Pocan (Democratic) 97.4%
Wisconsin 3	EVEN	Ron Kind	Democratic	1996	Incumbent re-elected.	▌ ✓ Ron Kind (Democratic) 59.7%; ▌Steve Toft (Republican) 40.3%
Wisconsin 4	D+25	Gwen Moore	Democratic	2004	Incumbent re-elected.	▌ ✓ Gwen Moore (Democratic) 75.7%; ▌Tim Rogers (Republican) 21.7%; ▌Robert Raymond (Independent) 2.6%
Wisconsin 5	R+13	Jim Sensenbrenner	Republican	1978	Incumbent re-elected.	▌ ✓ Jim Sensenbrenner (Republican) 62.0%; ▌Tom Palzewicz (Democratic) 38.0%
Wisconsin 6	R+8	Glenn Grothman	Republican	2014	Incumbent re-elected.	▌ ✓ Glenn Grothman (Republican) 55.5%; ▌Dan Kohl (Democratic) 44.5%
Wisconsin 7	R+8	Sean Duffy	Republican	2010	Incumbent re-elected.	▌ ✓ Sean Duffy (Republican) 59.9%; ▌Margaret Engebretson (Democratic) 38.4%; ▌Ken Driessen (Independent) 1.7%
Wisconsin 8	R+7	Mike Gallagher	Republican	2016	Incumbent re-elected.	▌ ✓ Mike Gallagher (Republican) 63.7%; ▌Beau Liegeois (Democratic) 36.3%

== Wyoming ==
Republicans maintained control of the sole seat in the state.

District		Incumbent			Results	Candidates
Location	2017 PVI	Representative	Party	First elected	Results	Candidates
Wyoming at-large	R+25	Liz Cheney	Republican	2016	Incumbent re-elected.	▌ ✓ Liz Cheney (Republican) 63.7%; ▌Greg Hunter (Democratic) 29.8%; ▌Richard Brubaker (Libertarian) 3.5%; ▌Daniel Cummings (Constitution) 3.0%

== Non-voting delegates ==
=== American Samoa ===
District	Incumbent			Results	Candidates
District	Delegate	Party	First elected	Results	Candidates
American Samoa at-large	Amata Coleman Radewagen	Republican	2014	Incumbent re-elected.	▌ ✓ Amata Coleman Radewagen (Republican) 83.28%; ▌Tuika Tuika (Independent) 9.09%; ▌Meleagi Suitonu Chapman (Democratic) 7.63%

=== District of Columbia ===
District	Incumbent			Results	Candidates
District	Delegate	Party	First elected	Results	Candidates
District of Columbia at-large	Eleanor Holmes Norton	Democratic	1990	Incumbent re-elected.	▌ ✓ Eleanor Holmes Norton (Democratic) 87.7%; ▌Nelson Rimensnyder (Republican) 4.3%; ▌Natale Stracuzzi (D.C. Statehood Green) 3.8%; ▌Erik Metzroh (Independent) 2.4%; ▌Bruce Majors (Libertarian) 1.8%

=== Guam ===
District	Incumbent			Results	Candidates
District	Delegate	Party	First elected	Results	Candidates
Guam at-large	Madeleine Bordallo	Democratic	2002	Incumbent lost renomination. Democratic hold.	▌ ✓ Michael San Nicolas (Democratic) 54.9%; ▌Doris Flores Brooks (Republican) 44.0%; Write-ins 1.14%

=== Northern Mariana Islands ===
The election for a non-voting delegate from the Northern Mariana Islands was postponed until Tuesday, November 13, 2018, due to the impact of Typhoon Yutu.

District	Incumbent			Results	Candidates
District	Delegate	Party	First elected	Results	Candidates
Northern Mariana Islands at-large	Gregorio Sablan	Independent	2008	Incumbent re-elected.	▌ ✓ Gregorio Sablan (Independent) 63.77%; ▌Angel Demapan (Republican) 36.23%

=== Puerto Rico ===
The Resident Commissioner of Puerto Rico is not up for re-election until 2020. Currently held by Republican Jenniffer González, who was first elected in 2016, the Resident Commissioner is the only member of the United States House of Representatives to serve a four-year term.

=== United States Virgin Islands ===
District	Incumbent			Results	Candidates
District	Delegate	Party	First elected	Results	Candidates
United States Virgin Islands at-large	Stacey Plaskett	Democratic	2014	Incumbent re-elected.	▌ ✓ Stacey Plaskett (Democratic) 98.41%; Write-ins 1.59%

== See also ==
- 115th United States Congress
- 116th United States Congress
  - List of new members of the 116th United States Congress
- 2018 United States elections
  - 2018 United States gubernatorial elections
  - 2018 United States Senate elections
