= 2018 United States House of Representatives elections in Ohio =

- November 6, 2018

All 16 Ohio seats to the United States House of Representatives
- Turnout: 54.30%
	Majority party	Minority party
Party	Republican	Democratic
Last election	12	4
Seats before	12	4
Seats won	12	4
Seat change	Steady	Steady
Popular vote	2,291,333	2,082,684
Percentage	52.00%	47.27%
Swing	▼6.17%	▲5.44%

Republican
50–60%
60–70%
70–80%
80–90%
Democratic
50–60%
60–70%
70–80%
80–90%

The 2018 United States House of Representatives elections in Ohio were held on November 6, 2018, to elect the 16 U.S. representatives from the U.S. state of Ohio, one from each of the state's 16 congressional districts. The elections coincided with other elections to the House of Representatives, elections to the United States Senate, and various state and local elections.

== Overview ==
=== Statewide ===
Party	Candidates	Votes		Seats		
Party	Candidates	No.	%	No.	+/–	%
Republican	16	2,245,403	52.27	12	Steady	75.00
Democratic	16	2,019,120	47.00	4	Steady	25.00
Libertarian	4	22,297	0.53	0	Steady	0.00
Green	2	7,983	0.19	0	Steady	0.00
Write-in	6	124	0.00	0	Steady	0.00
Total	44	4,295,557	100.00	16	Steady	100.00

Popular vote
Republican	52.27%
Democratic	47.00%
Other	0.73%

House seats
Republican	75.00%
Democratic	25.00%

=== District ===
Results of the 2018 United States House of Representatives elections in Ohio by district:

District	Republican		Democratic		Others		Total		Result
District	Votes	%	Votes	%	Votes	%	Votes	%	Result
District 1	154,409	51.32%	141,118	46.90%	5,344	1.78%	300,871	100.00%	Republican hold
District 2	166,714	57.55%	119,333	41.20%	3,614	1.25%	289,661	100.00%	Republican hold
District 3	65,040	26.37%	181,575	73.61%	62	0.03%	246,677	100.00%	Democratic hold
District 4	167,993	65.26%	89,412	34.74%	0	0.00%	257,405	100.00%	Republican hold
District 5	176,569	62.26%	99,655	35.14%	7,393	2.61%	283,617	100.00%	Republican hold
District 6	172,774	69.25%	76,716	30.75%	0	0.00%	249,490	100.00%	Republican hold
District 7	153,117	58.74%	107,536	41.26%	0	0.00%	260,653	100.00%	Republican hold
District 8	173,852	66.58%	87,281	33.42%	0	0.00%	261,133	100.00%	Republican hold
District 9	74,670	32.19%	157,219	67.79%	48	0.02%	231,937	100.00%	Democratic hold
District 10	157,554	55.93%	118,785	42.16%	5,387	1.91%	281,726	100.00%	Republican hold
District 11	44,486	17.75%	206,138	82.24%	36	0.01%	250,660	100.00%	Democratic hold
District 12	175,677	51.42%	161,251	47.20%	4,719	1.38%	341,647	100.00%	Republican hold
District 13	98,047	39.01%	153,323	60.99%	0	0.00%	251,370	100.00%	Democratic hold
District 14	169,809	55.25%	137,549	44.75%	0	0.00%	307,358	100.00%	Republican hold
District 15	170,593	58.33%	116,112	39.71%	5,738	1.96%	292,443	100.00%	Republican hold
District 16	170,029	56.73%	129,681	43.27%	0	0.00%	299,710	100.00%	Republican hold
Total	2,291,333	52.00%	2,082,684	47.27%	32,341	0.73%	4,406,358	100.00%	

== District 1 ==
2018 Ohio's 1st congressional district election
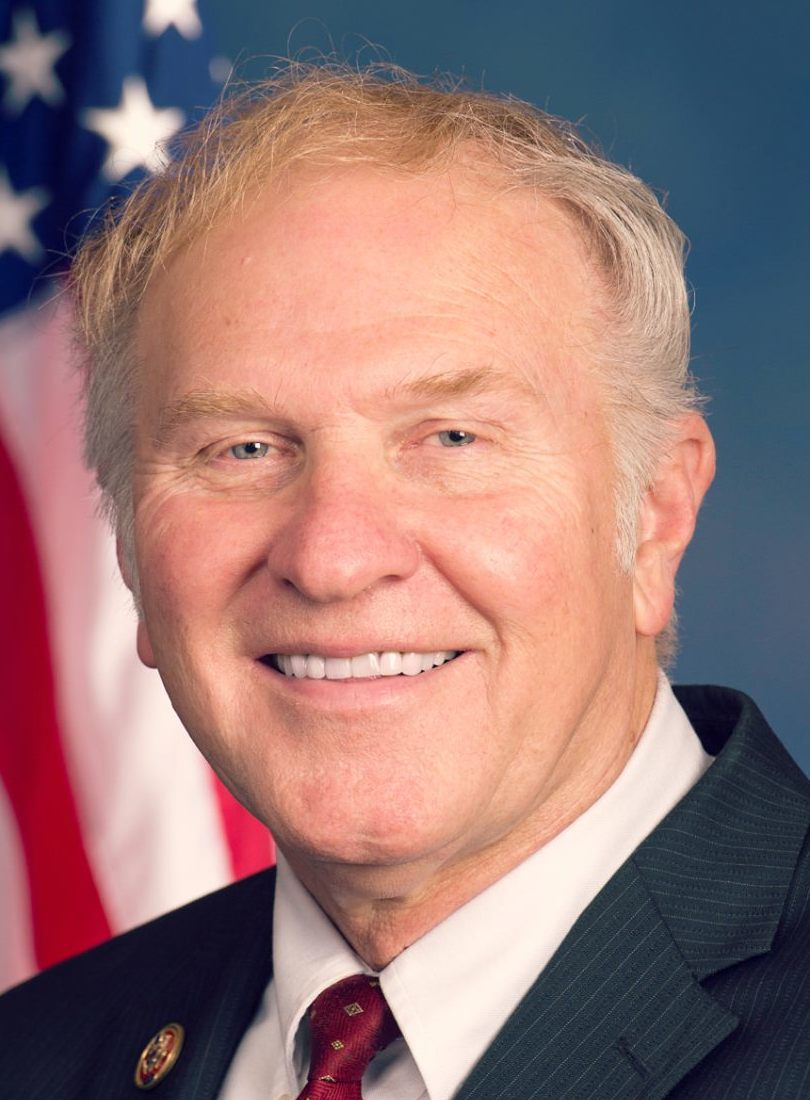

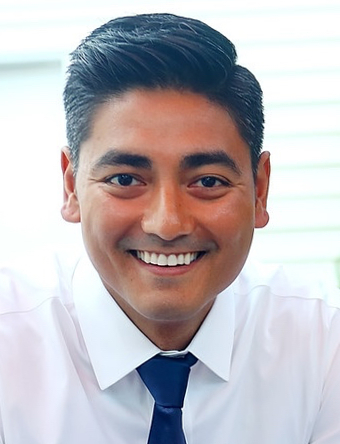
Nominee	Steve Chabot	Aftab Pureval
Party	Republican	Democratic
Popular vote	154,409	141,118
Percentage	51.3%	46.9%
- Chabot: 40–50% 50–60% 60–70% 70–80% 80–90% Pureval: 40–50% 50–60% 60–70% 70–80% 80–90% >90% No votes
U.S. Representative before election
Steve Chabot
Republican
Elected U.S. Representative
Steve Chabot
Republican

The 1st district is based in Cincinnati, stretching southwestward to Ohio's borders with Kentucky and Indiana. Incumbent Republican Steve Chabot was re-elected with 59% of the vote in 2016. He was challenged by attorney and Hamilton County Clerk of Courts Aftab Pureval.

=== Republican primary ===
==== Candidates ====
===== Nominee =====
- Steve Chabot, incumbent U.S. Representative

===== Eliminated in primary =====
- Samuel Ronan, United States Air Force veteran, 2016 State House candidate and candidate for chair of the Democratic National Committee in 2017

==== Primary results ====
Republican primary results
Party	Candidate	Votes	%
Republican	Steve Chabot (incumbent)	40,875	83.19
Republican	Samuel Ronan	8,259	16.81
Total votes		49,134	100

=== Democratic primary ===
==== Candidates ====
===== Nominee =====
- Aftab Pureval, attorney and Hamilton County Clerk of Courts

===== Withdrawn =====
- Robert Barr, rabbi
- Laura Ann Weaver, dentist

===== Declined =====
- Eric Elias, businessman
- Mark W. Lippert, former United States Ambassador to South Korea
- Todd Portune, Hamilton County Commissioner
- Alicia Reece, state representative
- P.G. Sittenfeld, Member of Cincinnati City Council and candidate for U.S. Senate in 2016
- Michele Young, attorney, author and nominee for this seat in 2016

==== Campaign ====
Pureval raised $660,000 in the first eight weeks after announcing his candidacy with nearly 80% of the money from people local to the district. This, his campaign team claimed, was more than any Democratic challenger had raised in a single quarter against Chabot.

==== Endorsements ====
Aftab Pureval

Federal officials

- Barack Obama, 44th U.S. President

Labor unions

- Ohio AFL-CIO

Political advocacy groups

- Asian American Action Fund
- ASPIRE PAC
- Human Rights Campaign
- Indian American Impact Fund

Individuals

- Robert Barr, withdrawn candidate

==== Primary results ====
Democratic primary results
Party	Candidate	Votes	%
Democratic	Aftab Pureval	27,641	100
Total votes		27,641	100

=== General election ===
==== Campaign ====
Despite being the strongest challenger to Chabot since his congressional comeback in 2010, the Pureval campaign was hit with two significant controversies that impacted their chances.

Firstly, he was accused of spending funds from his clerk campaign account on expenances in relation to his house campaign, in violation of Ohio election law. The Ohio Elections Commission dismissed 28 of 29 charges brought against the campaign, before issuing them a $100 fine for the single upheld charge (which had been caused by a clerical error).

Secondly, a 22-year-old Pureval volunteer managed to infiltrate the Chabot campaign and gain access to a sensitive voter database. After the election Pureval would "take responsibility" for the volunteer's actions and formally apologized to Chabot.

==== Endorsements ====
Steve Chabot (R)

Political advocacy groups

- Americans for Prosperity
- Ohio State Medical Association PAC
Aftab Pureval (D)

Former U.S. Executive Branch officials

- Barack Obama, 44th President of the United States

U.S. Senators

- Brian Schatz, U.S. Senator (D-HI)

Labor unions

- Communications Workers of America
- Ohio AFL-CIO
- Service Employees International Union

Organizations

- CBC PAC
- CHC Bold PAC
- Democratic Congressional Campaign Committee "Red to Blue" Program

Political advocacy groups

- Asian American Action Fund
- ASPIRE PAC
- End Citizens United
- Everytown for Gun Safety
- Giffords
- Human Rights Campaign
- Indian American Impact Fund
- League of Conservation Voters
- MoveOn
- NARAL Pro-Choice America
- Planned Parenthood Votes Ohio
- Sierra Club

==== Polling ====
View source data.

Poll source	Date(s) administered	Sample size	Margin of error	Steve Chabot (R)	Aftab Pureval (D)	Dirk Kubala (L)	Undecided
Change Research (D)	November 2–4, 2018	457	–	47%	44%	2%	7%
NYT Upshot/Siena College	October 20–24, 2018	492	± 4.5%	50%	41%	1%	9%
NYT Upshot/Siena College	September 27 – October 1, 2018	503	± 4.6%	50%	41%	–	9%
American Viewpoint (R-CLF)	September 18–20, 2018	400	± 4.9%	46%	39%	–	–
GBA Strategies (D-Pureval)	September 11–13, 2018	500	± 4.4%	44%	46%	4%	–
Public Policy Polling (D)	April 16–17, 2018	662	± 3.7%	43%	42%	–	15%
GBA Strategies (D-Pureval)	January 11–16, 2018	400	± 4.9%	51%	45%	–	5%

==== Predictions ====
Source	Ranking	As of
The Cook Political Report	Lean R	November 5, 2018
Inside Elections	Tilt R	November 5, 2018
Sabato's Crystal Ball	Lean R	November 5, 2018
RCP	Lean R	November 5, 2018
Daily Kos	Lean R	November 5, 2018
538	Likely R	November 7, 2018

==== Debate ====
2018 Ohio's 1st congressional district debate
No.	Date	Host	Moderator	Link	Republican	Democratic
Key: P Participant A Absent N Not invited I Invited W Withdrawn						
Key: P Participant A Absent N Not invited I Invited W Withdrawn					Steve Chabot	Aftab Pureval
1	Oct. 16, 2018	WKRC-TV	Jeff Hirsh	YouTube (Note: The 1st and 2nd district debates were held concurrently.)	P	P

==== Results ====
Ohio's 1st congressional district, 2018
Party	Candidate	Votes	%
Republican	Steve Chabot (incumbent)	154,409	51.3
Democratic	Aftab Pureval	141,118	46.9
Libertarian	Dirk Kubala	5,339	1.8
Independent	Kiumars Kiani (write-in)	5	0.0
Total votes		300,871	100.0
Republican hold			

== District 2 ==
2018 Ohio's 2nd congressional district election
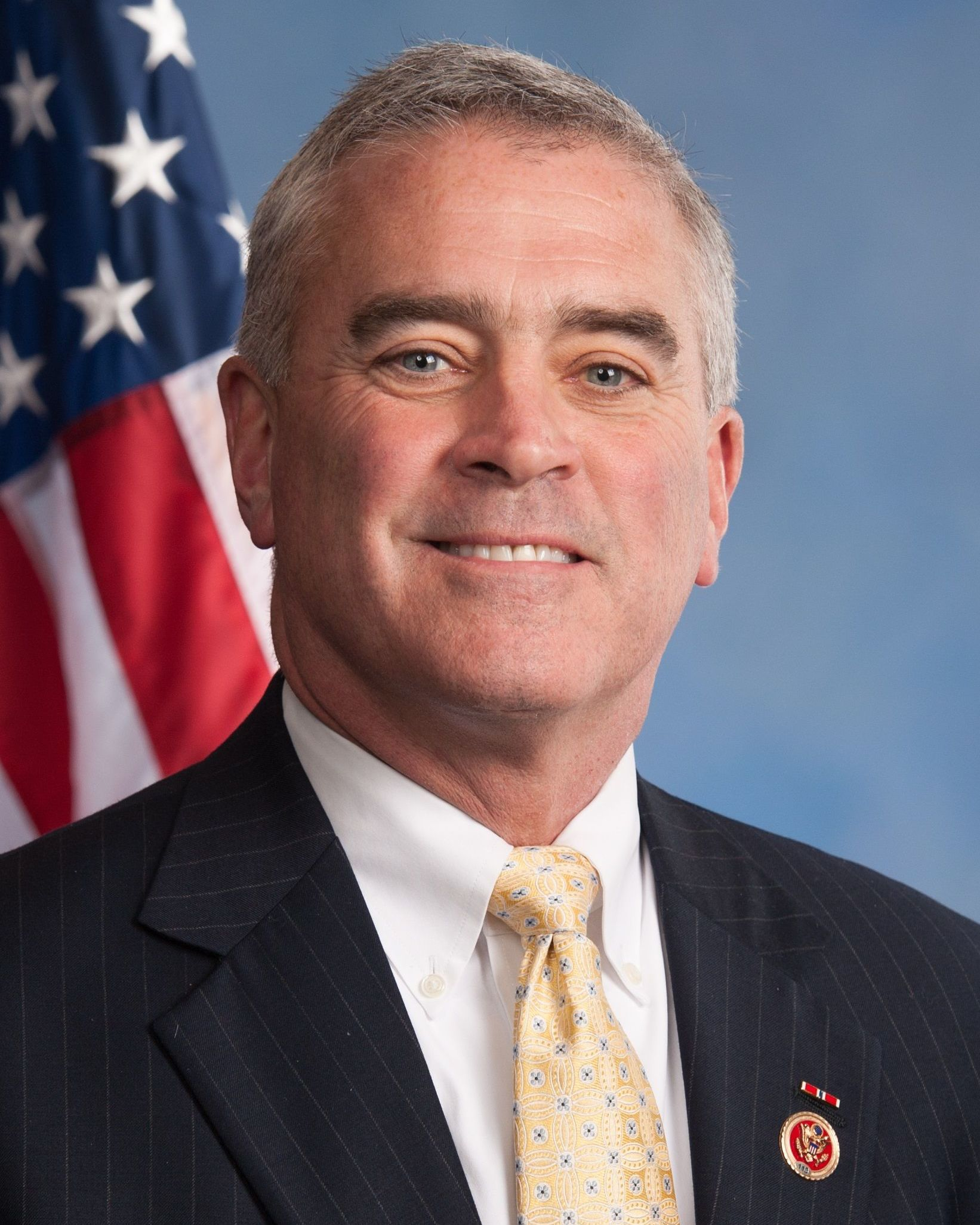

Nominee	Brad Wenstrup	Jill Schiller
Party	Republican	Democratic
Popular vote	166,714	119,333
Percentage	57.6%	41.2%
- Wenstrup: 40–50% 50–60% 60–70% 70–80% 80–90% >90% Schiller: 40–50% 50–60% 60–70% 70–80% 80–90% >90% Tie: 40–50% No votes
U.S. Representative before election
Brad Wenstrup
Republican
Elected U.S. Representative
Brad Wenstrup
Republican

The 2nd district takes eastern Cincinnati and its suburbs, including Norwood and Loveland, and stretches eastward along the Ohio River. The incumbent was Republican Brad Wenstrup, who had represented the district since 2013. He was re-elected with 65% of the vote in 2016.

=== Republican primary ===
==== Candidates ====
===== Nominee =====
- Brad Wenstrup, incumbent U.S. Representative

==== Primary results ====
Republican primary results
Party	Candidate	Votes	%
Republican	Brad Wenstrup (incumbent)	44,829	100.00
Total votes		44,829	100

=== Democratic primary ===
==== Candidates ====
===== Nominee =====
- Jill Schiller, former special assistant in the White House Office of Management and Budget

===== Eliminated in primary =====
- Janet Everhard, retired physician and write-in candidate for this seat in 2016
- Ken McNeely, Brown County Democratic Party central committee chairman

===== Withdrawn =====
- Richard L. Crosby, attorney

===== Declined =====
- William R. Smith, perennial candidate
- Jerry Springer, talk show host, former Mayor of Cincinnati, nominee for OH-02 in 1970 and candidate for governor in 1982

==== Endorsements ====
Jill Schiller

Local officials

- Greg Landsman, Member of Cincinnati City Council
- P.G. Sittenfeld, Member of Cincinnati City Council and candidate for U.S. Senate in 2016

==== Primary results ====
Democratic primary results
Party	Candidate	Votes	%
Democratic	Jill Schiller	17,808	54.19
Democratic	Janet Everhard	11,320	34.45
Democratic	William R. Smith	3,732	11.36
Total votes		32,860	100.00

=== General election ===
==== Predictions ====
Source	Ranking	As of
The Cook Political Report	Safe R	November 5, 2018
Inside Elections	Safe R	November 5, 2018
Sabato's Crystal Ball	Safe R	November 5, 2018
RCP	Safe R	November 5, 2018
Daily Kos	Safe R	November 5, 2018
538	Safe R	November 7, 2018
CNN	Safe R	October 31, 2018
Politico	Safe R	November 4, 2018

==== Endorsements ====
Jill Schiller (D)

Former U.S. Executive Branch officials

- Barack Obama, 44th President of the United States

U.S Senators

- Sherrod Brown, U.S. Senator (2007–present)
- Elizabeth Warren, U.S. Senator from Massachusetts (2013–present)

U.S. Representatives

- Tony Coelho, former House Majority Whip and U.S. representative from California's 15th congressional district (1979–1989)
- Steve Driehaus, U.S. representative from Ohio's 1st congressional district (2009–2011)

State officials

- Ted Strickland, Governor of Ohio (2007–2011)

State legislators

- Brigid Kelly, state representative (2017–present)

Labor unions

- AFL-CIO
- American Federation of State, County and Municipal Employees
- International Brotherhood of Electrical Workers
- Laborers' International Union of North America
- United Food and Commercial Workers

Political advocacy groups

- Democracy for America
- End Citizens United
- MoveOn
- National Women's Political Caucus
- Sierra Club

Local officials

- John Cranley, Mayor of Cincinnati (2013–present)
- Denise Driehaus, Hamilton County Commissioner and former state representative
- Greg Landsman, Member of Cincinnati City Council
- Chris Seelbach, Member of Cincinnati City Council
- Yvette Simpson, former Member of Cincinnati City Council
- P.G. Sittenfeld, Member of Cincinnati City Council and candidate for U.S. Senate in 2016

==== Polling ====
Poll source	Date(s) administered	Sample size	Margin of error	Brad Wenstrup (R)	Jill Schiller (D)	Undecided
Change Research (D)	October 27–29, 2018	431	–	52%	39%	–

==== Debate ====
2018 Ohio's 2nd congressional district debate
No.	Date	Host	Moderator	Link	Republican	Democratic
Key: P Participant A Absent N Not invited I Invited W Withdrawn						
Key: P Participant A Absent N Not invited I Invited W Withdrawn					Brad Wenstrup	Jill Schiller
1	Oct. 16, 2018	WKRC-TV	Jeff Hirsh	YouTube	P	P

==== Results ====
Ohio's 2nd congressional district, 2018
Party	Candidate	Votes	%
Republican	Brad Wenstrup (incumbent)	166,714	57.6
Democratic	Jill Schiller	119,333	41.2
Green	Jim Condit Jr.	3,606	1.2
Independent	David Baker (write-in)	8	0.0
Total votes		289,661	100.0
Republican hold			

== District 3 ==
2018 Ohio's 3rd congressional district election
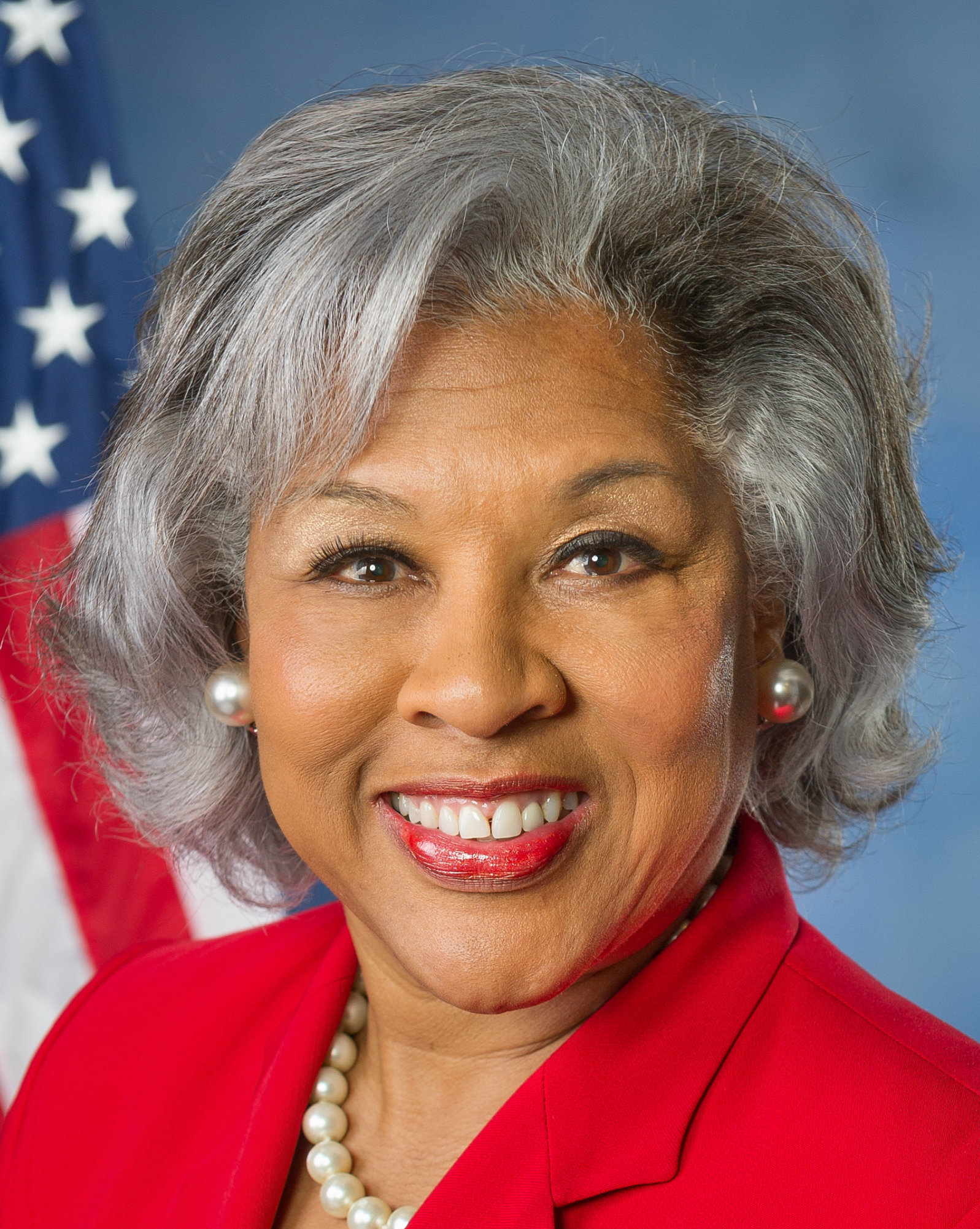

Nominee	Joyce Beatty	Jim Burgess
Party	Democratic	Republican
Popular vote	181,575	65,040
Percentage	73.6%	26.4%
- Precinct results Beatty: 50–60% 60–70% 70–80% 80–90% >90% Burgess: 50–60% 60–70% 70–80% >90% Tie: 50% No votes
U.S. Representative before election
Joyce Beatty
Democratic
Elected U.S. Representative
Joyce Beatty
Democratic

The 3rd district, located entirely within the borders of Franklin County, taking in inner Columbus, Bexley, Whitehall, as well as Franklin County's share of Reynoldsburg. The incumbent was Democrat Joyce Beatty, who had held the district since 2013. She was re-elected with 69% of the vote in 2016.

=== Democratic primary ===
==== Candidates ====
===== Nominee =====
- Joyce Beatty, incumbent U.S. Representative

==== Primary results ====
Democratic primary results
Party	Candidate	Votes	%
Democratic	Joyce Beatty (incumbent)	45,457	100
Total votes		45,457	100

=== Republican primary ===
==== Candidates ====
===== Nominee =====
- Jim Burgess

===== Eliminated in primary =====
- Abdulkadir M. Haji

==== Primary results ====
Republican primary results
Party	Candidate	Votes	%
Republican	Jim Burgess	9,350	93.15
Republican	Abdulkadir M. Haji	1,422	6.85
Total votes		20,772	100

=== General election ===
==== Predictions ====
Source	Ranking	As of
The Cook Political Report	Safe D	November 5, 2018
Inside Elections	Safe D	November 5, 2018
Sabato's Crystal Ball	Safe D	November 5, 2018
RCP	Safe D	November 5, 2018
Daily Kos	Safe D	November 5, 2018
538	Safe D	November 7, 2018
CNN	Safe D	October 31, 2018
Politico	Safe D	November 4, 2018

==== Results ====
Ohio's 3rd congressional district, 2018
Party	Candidate	Votes	%
Democratic	Joyce Beatty (incumbent)	181,575	73.6
Republican	Jim Burgess	65,040	26.4
Independent	Millie Milam (write-in)	62	0.0
Total votes		246,677	100.0
Democratic hold			

== District 4 ==
2018 Ohio's 4th congressional district election
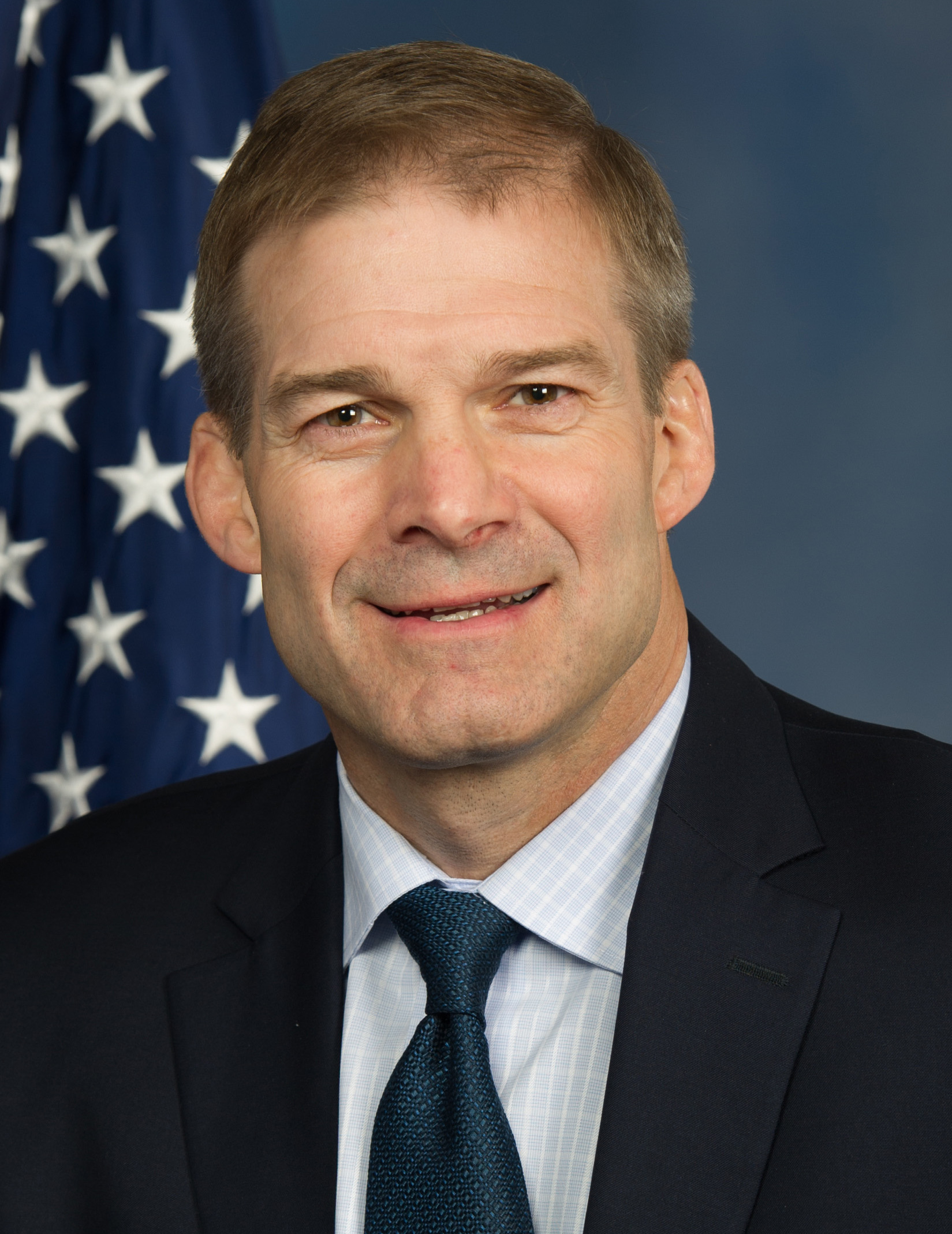

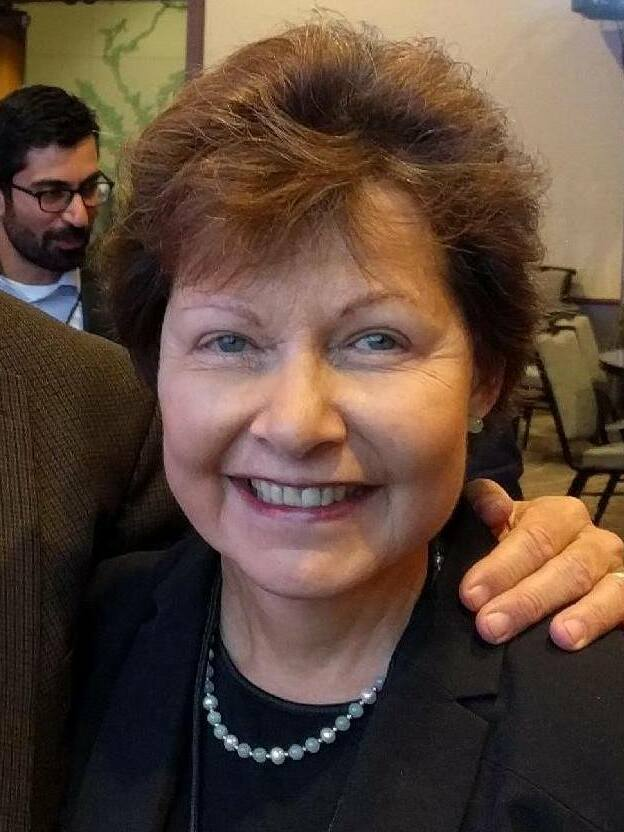
Nominee	Jim Jordan	Janet Garrett
Party	Republican	Democratic
Popular vote	167,993	99,655
Percentage	65.3%	34.7%
- Jordan: 50–60% 60–70% 70–80% 80–90% >90% Garrett: 50–60% 60–70% 70–80% 80–90% >90% Tie: 50% No votes
U.S. Representative before election
Jim Jordan
Republican
Elected U.S. Representative
Jim Jordan
Republican

The 4th district, nicknamed the "duck district", sprawls from the Columbus exurbs, including Marion and Lima into north-central Ohio, taking in Oberlin. The incumbent was Republican Jim Jordan, who had represented the district since 2007. He was re-elected with 68% of the vote in 2016.

=== Republican primary ===
==== Candidates ====
===== Nominee =====
- Jim Jordan, incumbent U.S. Representative

===== Eliminated in primary =====
- Joseph Miller

==== Primary results ====
Republican primary results
Party	Candidate	Votes	%
Republican	Jim Jordan (incumbent)	55,767	85.34
Republican	Joseph Miller	9,577	14.66
Total votes		65,344	100

=== Democratic primary ===
==== Candidates ====
===== Nominee =====
- Janet Garrett, retired teacher and nominee for this seat in 2014 & 2016

===== Eliminated in primary =====
- Cody James Slatzer-Rose, software developer

==== Primary results ====
Democratic primary results
Party	Candidate	Votes	%
Democratic	Janet Garrett	17,507	83.80
Democratic	Cody James Slatzer-Rose	3,385	16.20
Total votes		20,892	100

=== General election ===
==== Predictions ====
Source	Ranking	As of
The Cook Political Report	Safe R	November 5, 2018
Inside Elections	Safe R	November 5, 2018
Sabato's Crystal Ball	Safe R	November 5, 2018
RCP	Safe R	November 5, 2018
Daily Kos	Safe R	November 5, 2018
538	Safe R	November 7, 2018
CNN	Safe R	October 31, 2018
Politico	Safe R	November 4, 2018

==== Endorsements ====
Janet Garrett (D)

Organizations

- MoveOn

==== Polling ====
Poll source	Date(s) administered	Sample size	Margin of error	Jim Jordan (R)	Janet Garrett (D)	Undecided
Change Research (D)	November 2–4, 2018	350	–	60%	36%	–

==== Results ====
Ohio's 4th congressional district, 2018
Party	Candidate	Votes	%
Republican	Jim Jordan (incumbent)	167,993	65.3
Democratic	Janet Garrett	99,655	34.7
Total votes		257,405	100.0
Republican hold			

== District 5 ==
2018 Ohio's 5th congressional district election
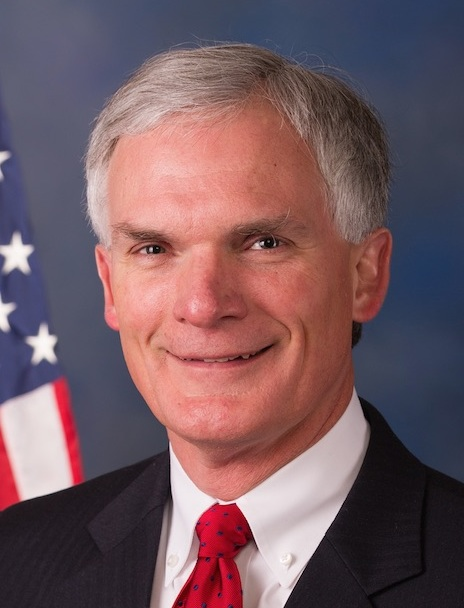

Nominee	Bob Latta	J. Michael Galbraith
Party	Republican	Democratic
Popular vote	173,894	97,352
Percentage	62.5%	34.5%
- Latta: 40–50% 50–60% 60–70% 70–80% 80–90% >90% Galbraith: 40–50% 50–60% 60–70% 70–80% 80–90% Tie: 40–50% No votes
U.S. Representative before election
Bob Latta
Republican
Elected U.S. Representative
Bob Latta
Republican

The 5th district encompasses Northwestern Ohio, taking in Findlay, Defiance, and Bowling Green. The incumbent was Republican Bob Latta, who had represented the district since 2007. He was re-elected with 71% of the vote in 2016.

=== Republican primary ===
==== Candidates ====
===== Nominee =====
- Bob Latta, incumbent U.S. Representative

===== Eliminated in primary =====
- Bob Kreienkamp
- Todd Wolfrum, Van Wert County Commissioner

==== Primary results ====
Republican primary results
Party	Candidate	Votes	%
Republican	Bob Latta (incumbent)	45,453	73.76
Republican	Todd Wolfrum	10,311	16.73
Republican	Robert Kreienkamp	5,861	9.51
Total votes		61,625	100

=== Democratic primary ===
==== Candidates ====
===== Nominee =====
- J. Michael Galbraith, Bowling Green State University teacher

===== Eliminated in primary =====
- James L. Neu Jr., employee of Chrysler's Toledo machining plant and nominee for this seat in 2016

==== Primary results ====
Democratic primary results
Party	Candidate	Votes	%
Democratic	J. Michael Galbraith	19,105	73.25
Democratic	James L. Neu, Jr.	6,976	26.75
Total votes		26,081	100

=== General election ===
==== Predictions ====
Source	Ranking	As of
The Cook Political Report	Safe R	November 5, 2018
Inside Elections	Safe R	November 5, 2018
Sabato's Crystal Ball	Safe R	November 5, 2018
RCP	Safe R	November 5, 2018
Daily Kos	Safe R	November 5, 2018
538	Safe R	November 7, 2018
CNN	Safe R	October 31, 2018
Politico	Safe R	November 4, 2018

==== Results ====
Ohio's 5th congressional district, 2018
Party	Candidate	Votes	%
Republican	Bob Latta (incumbent)	176,569	62.3
Democratic	J. Michael Galbraith	99,655	35.1
Libertarian	Don Kissick	7,393	2.6
Total votes		283,617	100.0
Republican hold			

== District 6 ==
2018 Ohio's 6th congressional district election
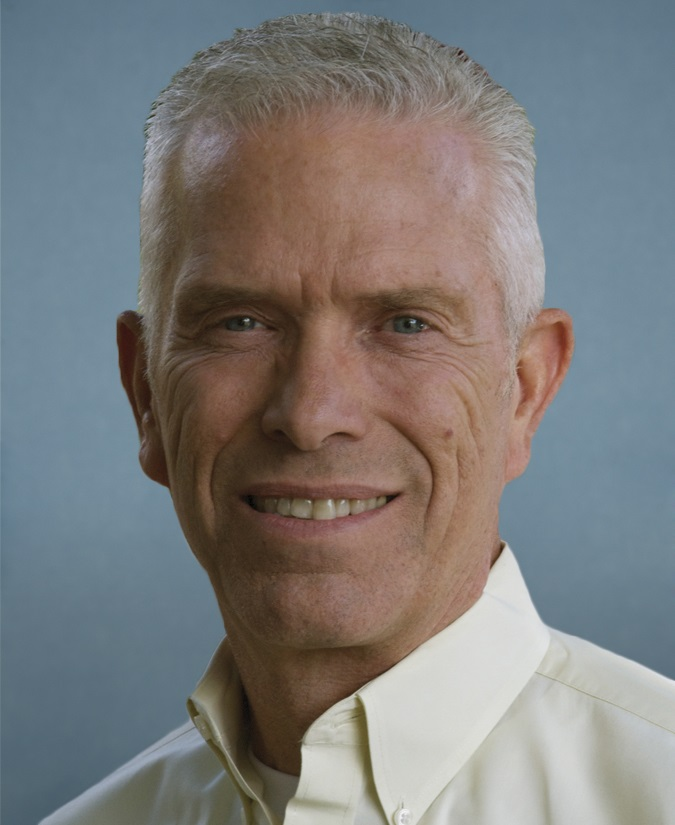

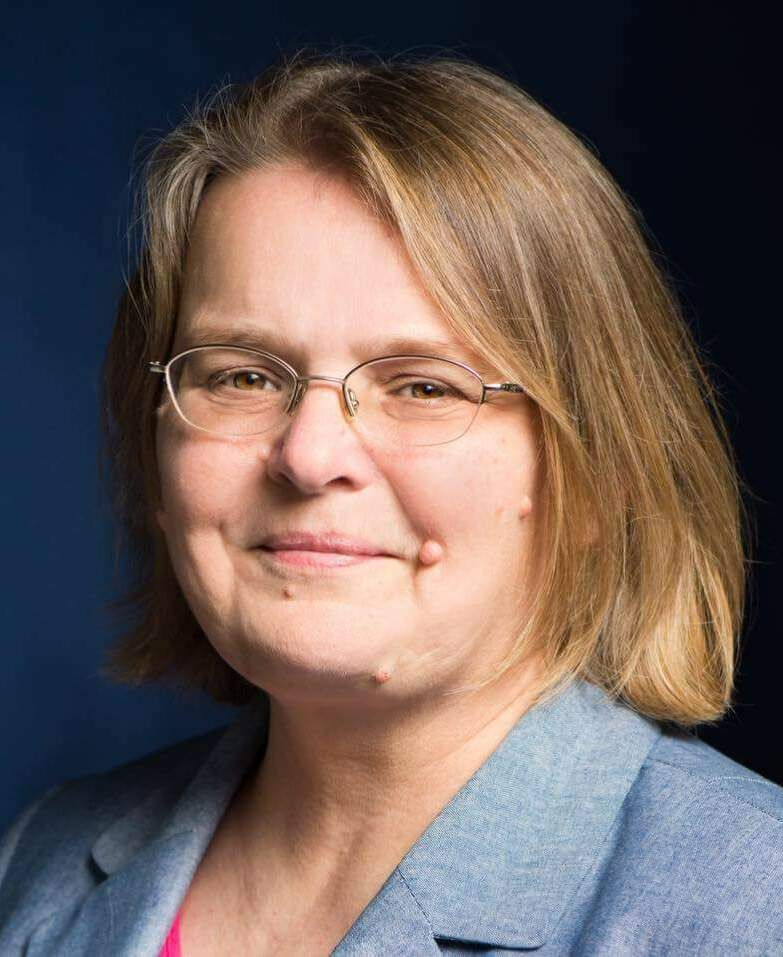
Nominee	Bill Johnson	Shawna Roberts
Party	Republican	Democratic
Popular vote	169,668	75,196
Percentage	69.3%	30.7%
- Johnson: 50–60% 60–70% 70–80% 80–90% Roberts: 50–60% 60–70% Tie: 50% No votes
U.S. Representative before election
Bill Johnson
Republican
Elected U.S. Representative
Bill Johnson
Republican

The 6th district encompasses Appalachian Ohio, including Steubenville, Marietta, and Ironton. The incumbent was Republican Bill Johnson, who had represented the district since 2011. He was re-elected with 71% of the vote in 2016.

=== Republican primary ===
==== Candidates ====
===== Nominee =====
- Bill Johnson, incumbent U.S. Representative

===== Eliminated in primary =====
- Robert Blazek, businessman

==== Primary results ====
Republican primary results
Party	Candidate	Votes	%
Republican	Bill Johnson (incumbent)	49,849	84.1
Republican	Robert Blazek	9,412	15.9
Total votes		59,261	100

=== Democratic primary ===
==== Candidates ====
===== Nominee =====
- Shawna Roberts, Belmont County resident and former small business owner

===== Eliminated in primary =====
- Werner Lange, former delegate for Bernie Sanders

==== Primary results ====
Democratic primary results
Party	Candidate	Votes	%
Democratic	Shawna Roberts	21,809	74.5
Democratic	Werner Lange	7,480	25.5
Total votes		29,289	100

=== General election ===
==== Predictions ====
Source	Ranking	As of
The Cook Political Report	Safe R	November 5, 2018
Inside Elections	Safe R	November 5, 2018
Sabato's Crystal Ball	Safe R	November 5, 2018
RCP	Safe R	November 5, 2018
Daily Kos	Safe R	November 5, 2018
538	Safe R	November 7, 2018
CNN	Safe R	October 31, 2018
Politico	Safe R	November 4, 2018

==== Results ====
Ohio's 6th congressional district, 2018
Party	Candidate	Votes	%
Republican	Bill Johnson (incumbent)	172,774	69.2
Democratic	Shawna Roberts	76,716	30.8
Total votes		249,490	100.0
Republican hold			

== District 7 ==
2018 Ohio's 7th congressional district election
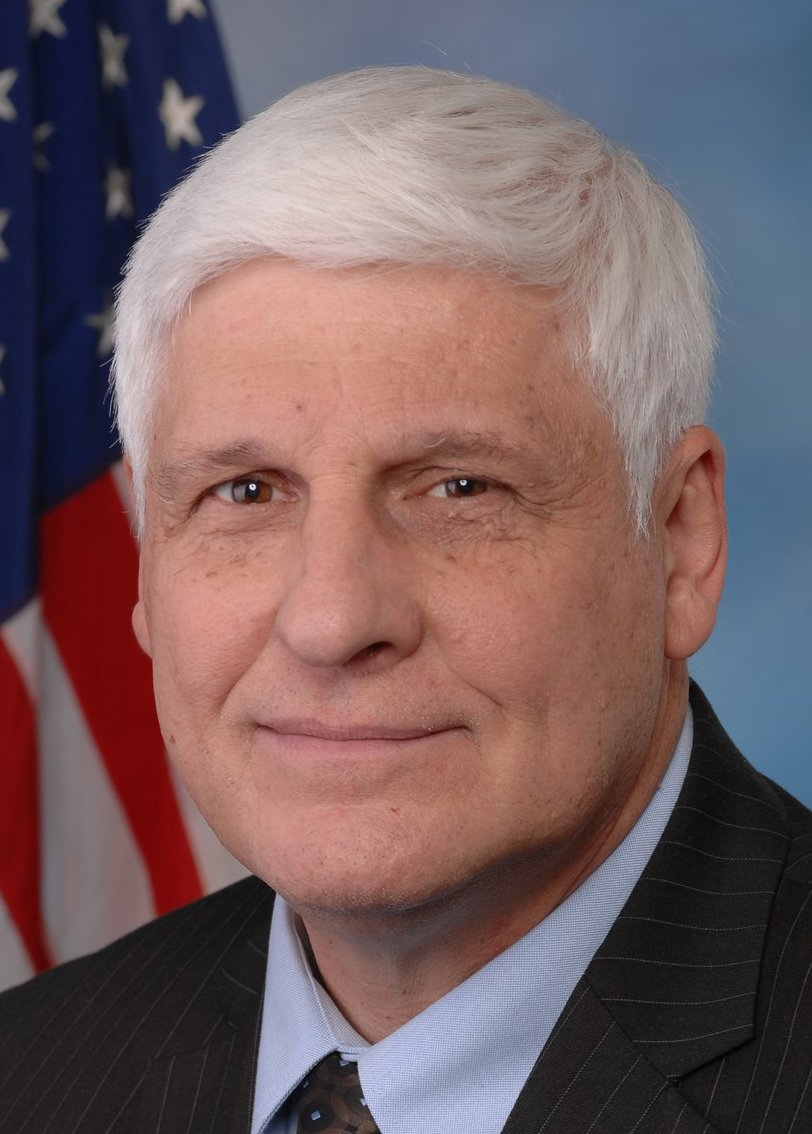

Nominee	Bob Gibbs	Ken Harbaugh
Party	Republican	Democratic
Popular vote	153,117	107,536
Percentage	58.74%	41.26%
- Gibbs: 50–60% 60–70% 70–80% 80–90% >90% Harbaugh: 50–60% 60–70% 70–80% 80–90% >90% Tie: 50% No votes
U.S. Representative before election
Bob Gibbs
Republican
Elected U.S. Representative
Bob Gibbs
Republican

The 7th district is based in northeastern Ohio, and includes the city of Canton. The incumbent was Republican Bob Gibbs, who had represented the district since 2013. He was re-elected with 64% of the vote in 2016.

=== Republican primary ===
==== Candidates ====
===== Nominee =====
- Bob Gibbs, incumbent U.S. Representative

===== Eliminated in primary =====
- Patrick Quinn, internet technician
- Terry Robertson, truck driver, real estate agent and candidate for this seat in 2016

==== Primary results ====
Republican primary results
Party	Candidate	Votes	%
Republican	Bob Gibbs (incumbent)	41,954	78.0
Republican	Patrick Quinn	6,158	11.4
Republican	Terry Robertson	5,699	10.6
Total votes		52,811	100

=== Democratic primary ===
==== Candidates ====
===== Nominee =====
- Ken Harbaugh, United States Navy veteran and president of Team Rubicon Global

===== Eliminated in primary =====
- Patrick Pikus, manager at the Timken Company

==== Primary results ====
Democratic primary results
Party	Candidate	Votes	%
Democratic	Ken Harbaugh	23,880	80.3
Democratic	Patrick Pikus	5,875	19.7
Total votes		29,755	100

=== General election ===
Ken Harbaugh (D)

Former U.S. Executive Branch officials

- Joe Biden, former Vice President of the United States

U.S. Senators

- Sherrod Brown, U.S. Senator (2007–present)
- Tammy Duckworth, U.S. Senator from Illinois (2017–present)
- Russ Feingold, U.S. Senator from Wisconsin (1993–2011)

U.S. Representatives

- Marcia Fudge, U.S. Representative from Ohio's 11th congressional district (2008–present)
- Marcy Kaptur, U.S. Representative from Ohio's 9th congressional district (1983–present)
- Dan Kildee, U.S. Representative from Michigan's 5th congressional district (2013–present)
- Seth Moulton, U.S. Representative from Massachusetts's 6th congressional district (2015–present)
- Scott Peters, U.S. Representative from California's 52nd congressional district (2013–present)
- Tim Ryan, U.S. Representative from Ohio's 12th congressional district (2003–present)
- Jan Schakowsky, U.S. Representative from Illinois's 9th congressional district (2013–present)
- Zack Space, U.S. Representative from Ohio's 18th congressional district (2007–2011)

State officials

- Howard Dean, former Governor of Vermont and candidate for President of the United States in 2004

Labor unions

- AFL-CIO
- Brotherhood of Locomotive Engineers and Trainmen
- Communications Workers of America
- International Association of Sheet Metal, Air, Rail and Transportation Workers
- International Brotherhood of Teamsters
- United Steelworkers

Political advocacy groups

- End Citizens United
- New Politics
- Vote Vets
- With Honor Fund

Newspapers

- The Canton Repository
- The Plain Dealer

Individuals

- Stanley A. McChrystal, retired Army general

==== Polling ====
Poll source	Date(s) administered	Sample size	Margin of error	Bob Gibbs (R)	Ken Harbaugh (D)	Other	Undecided
0ptimus/DDHQ	October 31 – November 1, 2018	800	± 3.45%	55%	36%	1%	8%
Change Research (D-Harbaugh)	October 25–26, 2018	682	–	49%	43%	–	–
The Mellman Group (D-Harbaugh)	October 3–6, 2018	400	± 4.9%	45%	38%	–	–

==== Predictions ====
Source	Ranking	As of
The Cook Political Report	Safe R	November 5, 2018
Inside Elections	Safe R	November 5, 2018
Sabato's Crystal Ball	Likely R	November 5, 2018
RCP	Safe R	November 5, 2018
Daily Kos	Likely R	November 5, 2018
538	Safe R	November 7, 2018

==== Results ====
Ohio's 7th congressional district, 2018
Party	Candidate	Votes	%
Republican	Bob Gibbs (incumbent)	153,117	58.7
Democratic	Ken Harbaugh	107,536	41.3
Total votes		260,653	100.0
Republican hold			

== District 8 ==
2018 Ohio's 8th congressional district election
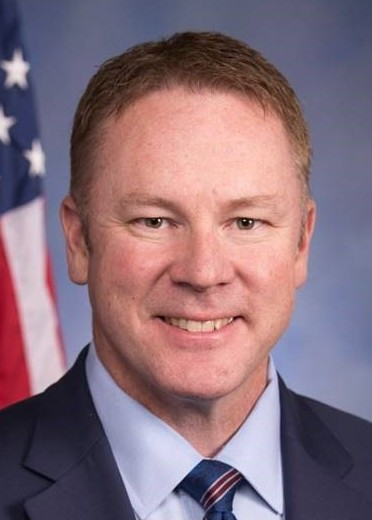

Nominee	Warren Davidson	Vanessa Enoch
Party	Republican	Democratic
Popular vote	173,852	87,281
Percentage	66.6%	33.4%
- Davidson: 50–60% 60–70% 70–80% 80–90% >90% Enoch: 50–60% 60–70% 70–80% 80–90% >90% Tie: 50% No votes
U.S. Representative before election
Warren Davidson
Republican
Elected U.S. Representative
Warren Davidson
Republican

The 8th district takes in the northern suburbs of Cincinnati, including Butler County, as well as taking in Springfield. The incumbent was Republican Warren Davidson, who had represented the district since 2016. He was re-elected with 69% of the vote in 2016.

=== Republican primary ===
==== Candidates ====
===== Nominee =====
- Warren Davidson, incumbent U.S. Representative

==== Primary results ====
Republican primary results
Party	Candidate	Votes	%
Republican	Warren Davidson (incumbent)	51,654	100
Total votes		51,654	100

=== Democratic primary ===
==== Candidates ====
===== Nominee =====
- Vanessa Enoch, management consultant

===== Eliminated in primary =====
- Bill Ebben
- Matthew J. Guyette, paralegal
- Ted Jones

==== Primary results ====
Democratic primary results
Party	Candidate	Votes	%
Democratic	Vanessa Enoch	11,343	57.8
Democratic	Ted Jones	3,201	16.3
Democratic	Matthew J. Guyette	2,688	13.7
Democratic	Bill Ebben	2,382	12.1
Total votes		19,614	100

=== General election ===
==== Predictions ====
Source	Ranking	As of
The Cook Political Report	Safe R	November 5, 2018
Inside Elections	Safe R	November 5, 2018
Sabato's Crystal Ball	Safe R	November 5, 2018
RCP	Safe R	November 5, 2018
Daily Kos	Safe R	November 5, 2018
538	Safe R	November 7, 2018
CNN	Safe R	October 31, 2018
Politico	Safe R	November 4, 2018

==== Results ====
Ohio's 8th congressional district, 2018
Party	Candidate	Votes	%
Republican	Warren Davidson (incumbent)	173,852	66.6
Democratic	Vanessa Enoch	87,281	33.4
Total votes		261,133	100.0
Republican hold			

== District 9 ==
2018 Ohio's 9th congressional district election
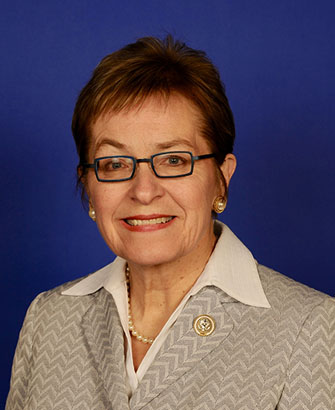

Nominee	Marcy Kaptur	Steven Kraus
Party	Democratic	Republican
Popular vote	157,219	74,670
Percentage	67.8%	32.2%
- Kaptur: 50–60% 60–70% 70–80% 80–90% >90% Kraus: 50–60% 60–70% No votes
U.S. Representative before election
Marcy Kaptur
Democratic
Elected U.S. Representative
Marcy Kaptur
Democratic

The 9th district spans the coast of Lake Erie from Toledo to the west side of Cleveland, taking in Port Clinton, Sandusky, Lorain, Lakewood, Brook Park, and Brooklyn. The incumbent was Democrat Marcy Kaptur, who had represented the district since 1983. She was re-elected with 69% of the vote in 2016.

=== Democratic primary ===
==== Candidates ====
===== Nominee =====
- Marcy Kaptur, incumbent U.S. Representative

===== Eliminated in primary =====
- Joshua Garcia, taxi driver

==== Primary results ====
Democratic primary results
Party	Candidate	Votes	%
Democratic	Marcy Kaptur (incumbent)	41,093	85.6
Democratic	Joshua Garcia	6,916	14.4
Total votes		48,009	100

=== Republican primary ===
==== Candidates ====
===== Nominee =====
- Steve Kraus, former state representative and convicted felon

===== Eliminated in primary =====
- Keith Colton
- W. Benjamin Franklin

==== Primary results ====
Republican primary results
Party	Candidate	Votes	%
Republican	Steve Kraus	10,284	49.5
Republican	Keith Colton	6,197	29.8
Republican	W. Benjamin Franklin	4,303	20.7
Total votes		20,784	100

=== General election ===
==== Predictions ====
Source	Ranking	As of
The Cook Political Report	Safe D	November 5, 2018
Inside Elections	Safe D	November 5, 2018
Sabato's Crystal Ball	Safe D	November 5, 2018
RCP	Safe D	November 5, 2018
Daily Kos	Safe D	November 5, 2018
538	Safe D	November 7, 2018
CNN	Safe D	October 31, 2018
Politico	Safe D	November 4, 2018

==== Results ====
Ohio's 9th congressional district, 2018
Party	Candidate	Votes	%
Democratic	Marcy Kaptur (incumbent)	157,219	67.8
Republican	Steve Kraus	74,670	32.2
Independent	McKenzie Levindofske (write-in)	48	0.0
Total votes		231,937	100.0
Democratic hold			

== District 10 ==
2018 Ohio's 10th congressional district election
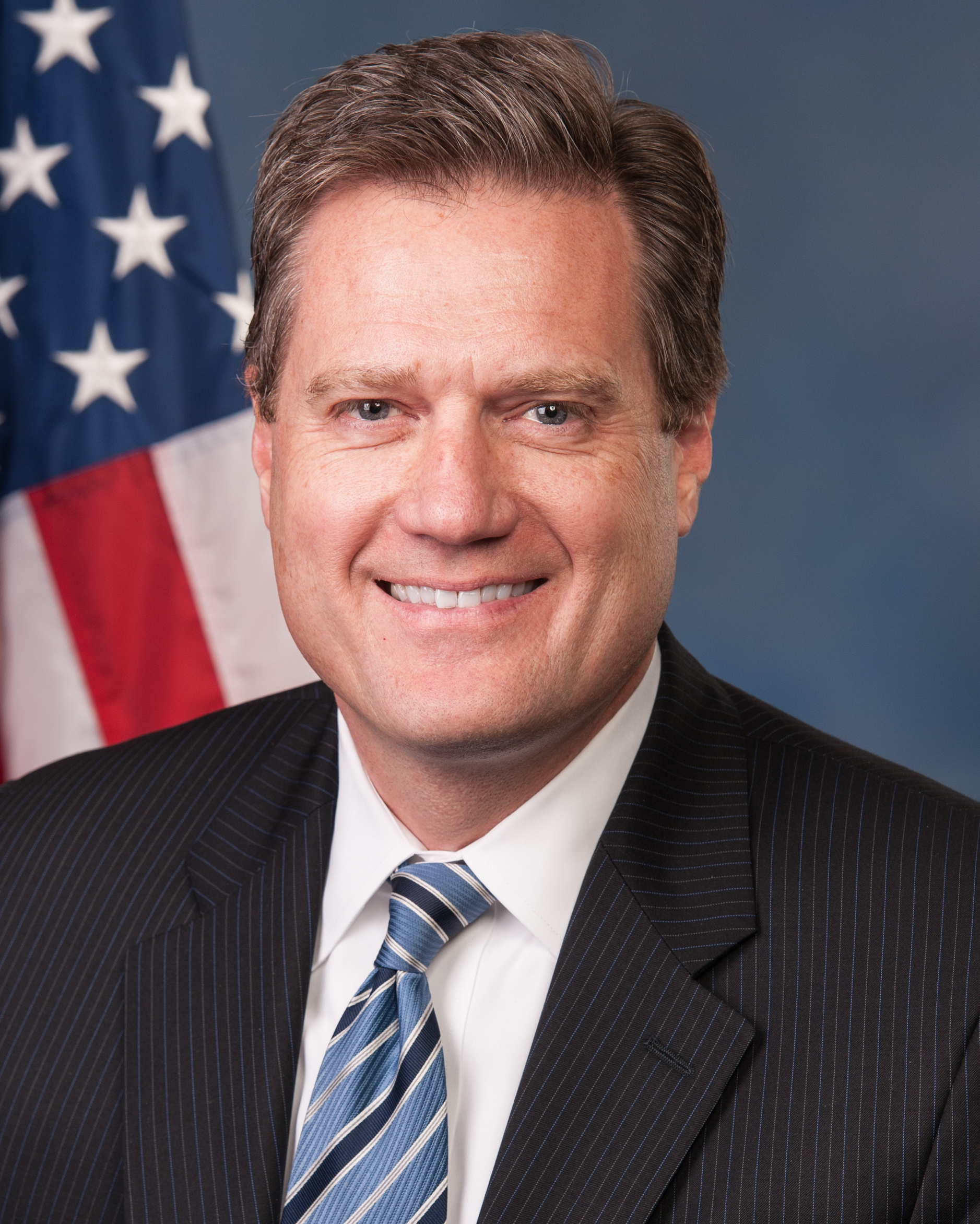

Nominee	Mike Turner	Theresa Gasper
Party	Republican	Democratic
Popular vote	157,554	118,785
Percentage	55.9%	42.2%
- Turner: 40–50% 50–60% 60–70% 70–80% 80–90% Gasper: 40–50% 50–60% 60–70% 70–80% 80–90% >90% Tie: 40–50% No votes
U.S. Representative before election
Mike Turner
Republican
Elected U.S. Representative
Mike Turner
Republican

The 10th district encompasses the Dayton metro area, including Dayton and the surrounding suburbs. The incumbent was Republican Mike Turner, who had represented the district since 2013. He was re-elected with 64% of the vote in 2016.

=== Republican primary ===
==== Candidates ====
===== Nominee =====
- Mike Turner, incumbent U.S. Representative

===== Eliminated in primary =====
- John Anderson, civilian air force acquisition logistics and sustainment manager and candidate for this seat in 2012 and 2014
- John Mitchell

==== Primary results ====
Republican primary results
Party	Candidate	Votes	%
Republican	Mike Turner (incumbent)	42,686	79.8
Republican	John Anderson	6,150	11.5
Republican	John Mitchell	4,637	8.7
Total votes		53,473	100

=== Democratic primary ===
==== Candidates ====
===== Nominee =====
- Theresa Gasper, business owner

===== Eliminated in primary =====
- Robert Klepinger
- Michael Milisits

==== Primary results ====
Democratic primary results
Party	Candidate	Votes	%
Democratic	Theresa Gasper	22,817	67.0
Democratic	Robert Klepinger	8,717	25.6
Democratic	Michael Milisits	2,496	7.3
Total votes		34,030	100

=== General election ===
==== Endorsements ====
Theresa Gasper (D)

Organizations

- EMILY's List
- End Citizens United
- MoveOn

==== Predictions ====
Source	Ranking	As of
The Cook Political Report	Likely R	November 5, 2018
Inside Elections	Safe R	November 5, 2018
Sabato's Crystal Ball	Likely R	November 5, 2018
RCP	Likely R	November 5, 2018
Daily Kos	Likely R	November 5, 2018
538	Likely R	November 7, 2018

==== Results ====
Ohio's 10th congressional district, 2018
Party	Candidate	Votes	%
Republican	Mike Turner (incumbent)	157,554	55.9
Democratic	Theresa Gasper	118,785	42.2
Libertarian	Dave Harlow	5,387	1.9
Total votes		281,726	100.0
Republican hold			

== District 11 ==
2018 Ohio's 11th congressional district election
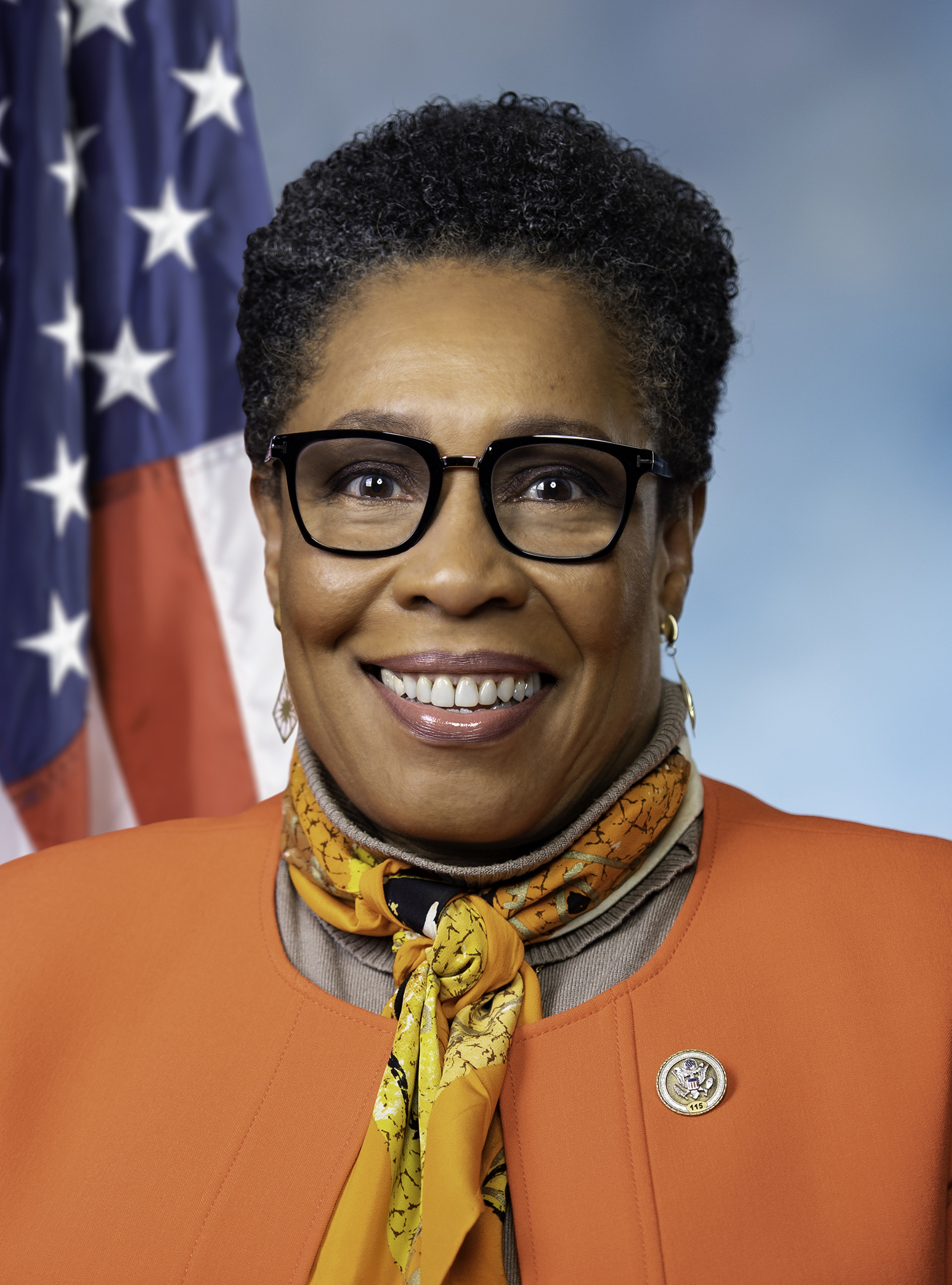

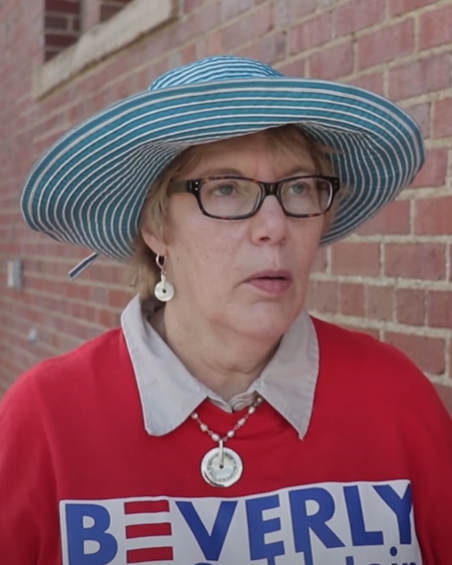
Nominee	Marcia Fudge	Beverly Goldstein
Party	Democratic	Republican
Popular vote	157,219	44,486
Percentage	82.2%	17.7%
- Fudge: 50–60% 60–70% 70–80% 80–90% >90% Goldstein: 50–60% 60–70% No votes
U.S. Representative before election
Marcia Fudge
Democratic
Elected U.S. Representative
Marcia Fudge
Democratic

The 11th district takes in eastern Cleveland and its suburbs, including Euclid, Cleveland Heights, and Warrensville Heights, as well as stretching southward into Richfield and parts of Akron. The incumbent was Democrat Marcia Fudge, who had represented the district since 2008. She was re-elected with 80% of the vote in 2016.

=== Democratic primary ===
==== Candidates ====
===== Nominee =====
- Marcia Fudge, incumbent U.S. Representative

==== Primary results ====
Democratic primary results
Party	Candidate	Votes	%
Democratic	Marcia Fudge (incumbent)	64,897	99.34
Democratic	Felicia Washington Ross	432	0.66
Total votes		65,329	100

=== Republican primary ===
==== Candidates ====
===== Nominee =====
- Beverly Goldstein, former university professor and nominee for this seat in 2016

===== Eliminated in primary =====
- Gregory P. Dunham

==== Primary results ====
Republican primary results
Party	Candidate	Votes	%
Republican	Beverly A. Goldstein	6,922	52.5
Republican	Gregory P. Dunham	6,258	47.5
Total votes		13,180	100

=== General election ===
==== Predictions ====
Source	Ranking	As of
The Cook Political Report	Safe D	November 5, 2018
Inside Elections	Safe D	November 5, 2018
Sabato's Crystal Ball	Safe D	November 5, 2018
RCP	Safe D	November 5, 2018
Daily Kos	Safe D	November 5, 2018
538	Safe D	November 7, 2018
CNN	Safe D	October 31, 2018
Politico	Safe D	November 4, 2018

==== Results ====
Ohio's 11th congressional district, 2018
Party	Candidate	Votes	%
Democratic	Marcia Fudge (incumbent)	206,138	82.2
Republican	Beverly A. Goldstein	44,486	17.8
Independent	James Jerome Bell (write-in)	36	0.0
Total votes		250,660	100.0
Democratic hold			

== District 12 ==
2018 Ohio's 12th congressional district election
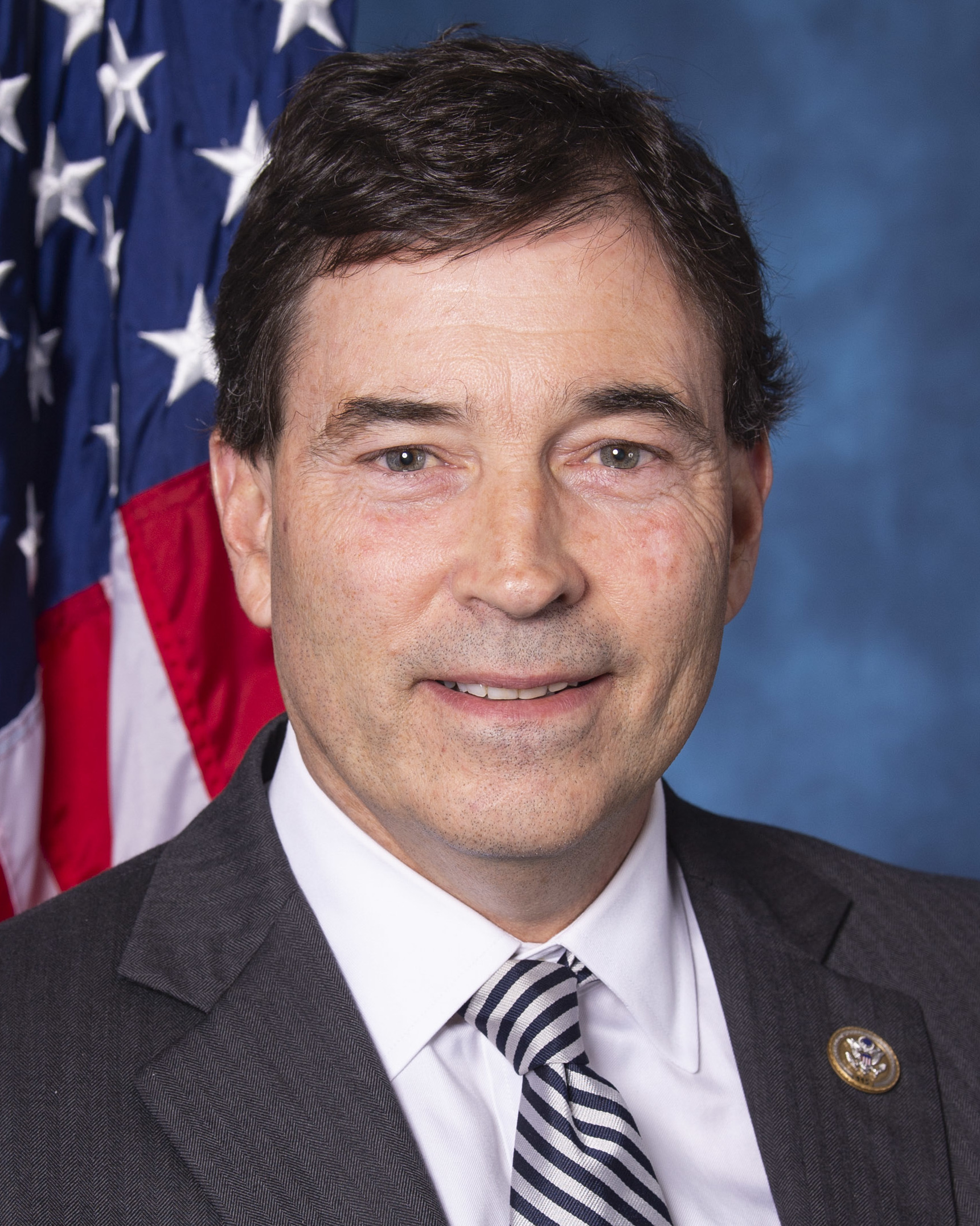

Nominee	Troy Balderson	Danny O'Connor
Party	Republican	Democratic
Popular vote	175,677	161,251
Percentage	51.4%	47.2%
- Balderson: 40–50% 50–60% 60–70% 70–80% 80–90% >90% O'Connor: 40–50% 50–60% 60–70% 70–80% 80–90% >90% Tie: 40–50% No votes
U.S. Representative before election
Troy Balderson
Republican
Elected U.S. Representative
Troy Balderson
Republican

The 12th district encompasses the northern Columbus metro area, taking in the northern Columbus suburbs, including Dublin, Westerville, Gahanna, and New Albany, as well as, Newark, Mansfield, and Zanesville. Republican Pat Tiberi was the representative of the district until his resignation on January 15, 2018. A special election was held on August 7, 2018, to fill the vacancy until January 3, 2019.

=== Republican primary ===
==== Nominee ====
- Troy Balderson, state senator and former state representative

==== Eliminated in primary ====
- John Adams, perennial candidate
- Kevin Bacon, state senator
- Lawrence Cohen, attorney
- Jon Halverstadt, real estate investor
- Tim Kane, conservative economist
- Melanie Leneghan, Liberty Township Trustee
- Pat Manley
- Carol O'Brien, Delaware County Prosecutor
- Myrl Shoemaker Jr., son of former lieutenant governor Myrl Shoemaker

==== Declined ====
- Andrew Brenner, state representative (running for state senate)
- Anne Gonzales, state representative (running for state senate)
- John Kasich, Governor and former U.S. Representative
- Clarence Mingo, Franklin County Auditor (endorsed Kevin Bacon)
- JD Vance, author and venture capitalist

Republican primary results
Party	Candidate	Votes	%
Republican	Troy Balderson	19,552	28.72
Republican	Melanie Leneghan	18,777	27.58
Republican	Tim Kane	11,491	16.88
Republican	Kevin Bacon	9,711	14.26
Republican	Carol O'Brien	4,415	6.48
Republican	Jon Halverstadt	1,130	1.66
Republican	Pat Manley	802	1.18
Republican	Lawrence Cohen	798	1.17
Republican	Myrl Shoemaker, Jr.	788	1.17
Republican	John Adams	618	0.91
Total votes		68,802	100

=== Democratic primary ===
==== Candidates ====
===== Nominee =====
- Danny O'Connor, Franklin County Auditor

===== Eliminated in primary =====
- Ed Albertson, businessman and candidate for this seat in 2016
- Jackie Patton, nurse
- John Peters, teacher
- John Russell, farmer
- Zach Scott, former Franklin County Sheriff and candidate for Mayor of Columbus in 2015
- Doug Wilson, healthcare professional

==== Primary results ====
Democratic primary results
Party	Candidate	Votes	%
Democratic	Danny O'Connor	18,211	40.52
Democratic	John Russell	7,310	16.27
Democratic	Zach Scott	7,236	16.10
Democratic	Jackie Patton	6,299	14.02
Democratic	Ed Albertson	3,531	7.86
Democratic	Doug Wilson	1,683	3.74
Democratic	John Peters	670	1.49
Total votes		44,940	100.0

=== General election ===
==== Endorsements ====
Danny O'Connor (D)

Organizations

- End Citizens United
- MoveOn

==== Polling ====
Poll source	Dates administered	Sample size	Margin of error	Troy Balderson (R)	Danny O'Connor (D)	Joe Manchik (G)	Undecided
GBA Strategies (D-O'Connor)	October 20–22, 2018	570	± 4.9%	47%	47%	4%	–
Clarity Campaign Labs (D)	October 11–13, 2018	639	± 3.87%	48%	46%	–	6%
GBA Strategies (D-O'Connor)	September 4–6, 2018	500	–	47%	46%	–	–

==== Predictions ====
Source	Ranking	As of
The Cook Political Report	Tossup	November 5, 2018
Inside Elections	Tossup	November 5, 2018
Sabato's Crystal Ball	Lean R	November 5, 2018
RCP	Lean R	November 5, 2018
Daily Kos	Lean R	November 5, 2018
538	Lean R	November 7, 2018

==== Results ====
Ohio's 12th congressional district, 2018
Party	Candidate	Votes	%
Republican	Troy Balderson (incumbent)	175,677	51.4
Democratic	Danny O'Connor	161,251	47.2
Green	Joe Manchik	4,718	1.4
Independent	Marc Fagin (write-in)	1	0.0
Total votes		341,647	100.0
Republican hold			

== District 13 ==
2018 Ohio's 13th congressional district election
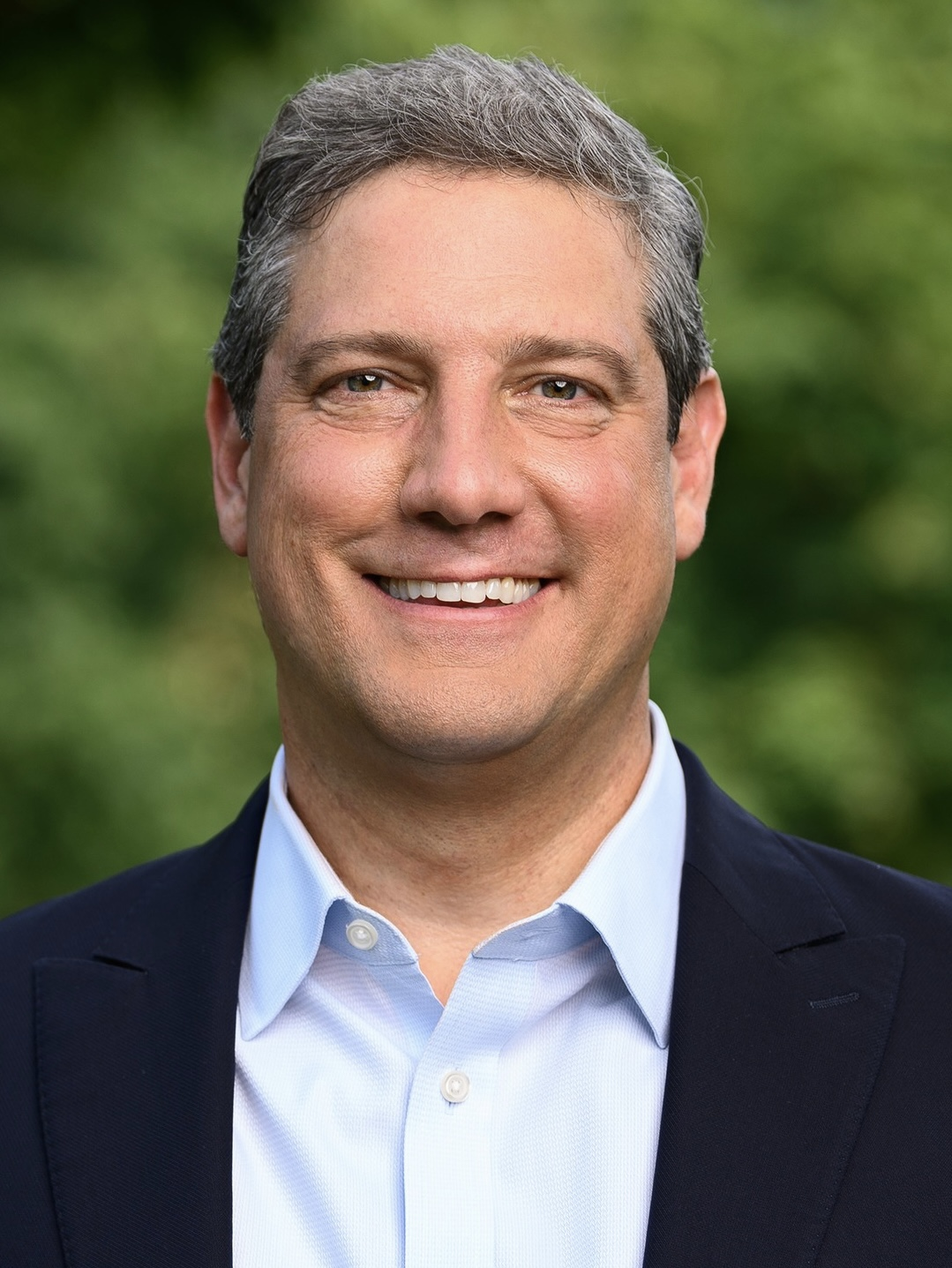

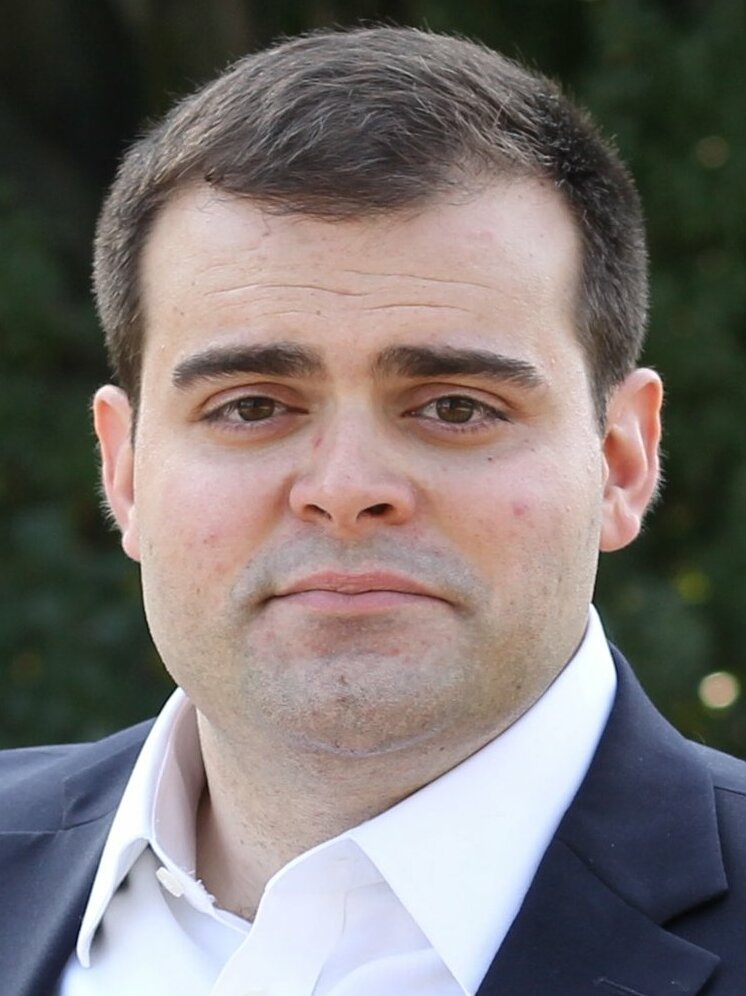
Nominee	Tim Ryan	Chris DePizzo
Party	Democratic	Republican
Popular vote	153,323	98,047
Percentage	61.0%	39.0%
- Ryan: 50–60% 60–70% 70–80% 80–90% >90% DePizzo: 50–60% 60–70% Tie: 50% No votes
U.S. Representative before election
Tim Ryan
Democratic
Elected U.S. Representative
Tim Ryan
Democratic

The 13th district covers the Mahoning Valley in northeastern Ohio, including Youngstown and eastern parts of Akron. The incumbent was Democrat Tim Ryan, who had represented the district since 2013. He was re-elected with 68% of the vote in 2016.

=== Democratic primary ===
==== Candidates ====
===== Nominee =====
- Tim Ryan, incumbent U.S. Representative

===== Eliminated in primary =====
- Robert Crow
- John Stephen Luchansky, perennial candidate

==== Primary results ====
Democratic primary results
Party	Candidate	Votes	%
Democratic	Tim Ryan (incumbent)	54,473	87.17
Democratic	John Stephen Luchansky	4,853	7.77
Democratic	Robert Crow	3,166	5.07
Total votes		62,492	100

=== Republican primary ===
==== Candidates ====
===== Nominee =====
- Chris DePizzo, attorney

==== Primary results ====
Republican primary results
Party	Candidate	Votes	%
Republican	Chris DePizzo	24,100	100
Total votes		24,100	100

=== General election ===
==== Predictions ====
Source	Ranking	As of
The Cook Political Report	Safe D	November 5, 2018
Inside Elections	Safe D	November 5, 2018
Sabato's Crystal Ball	Safe D	November 5, 2018
RCP	Safe D	November 5, 2018
Daily Kos	Safe D	November 5, 2018
538	Safe D	November 7, 2018
CNN	Safe D	October 31, 2018
Politico	Safe D	November 4, 2018

==== Results ====
Ohio's 13th congressional district, 2018
Party	Candidate	Votes	%
Democratic	Tim Ryan (incumbent)	153,323	61.0
Republican	Chris DePizzo	98,047	39.0
Total votes		251,370	100.0
Democratic hold			

== District 14 ==
2018 Ohio's 14th congressional district election
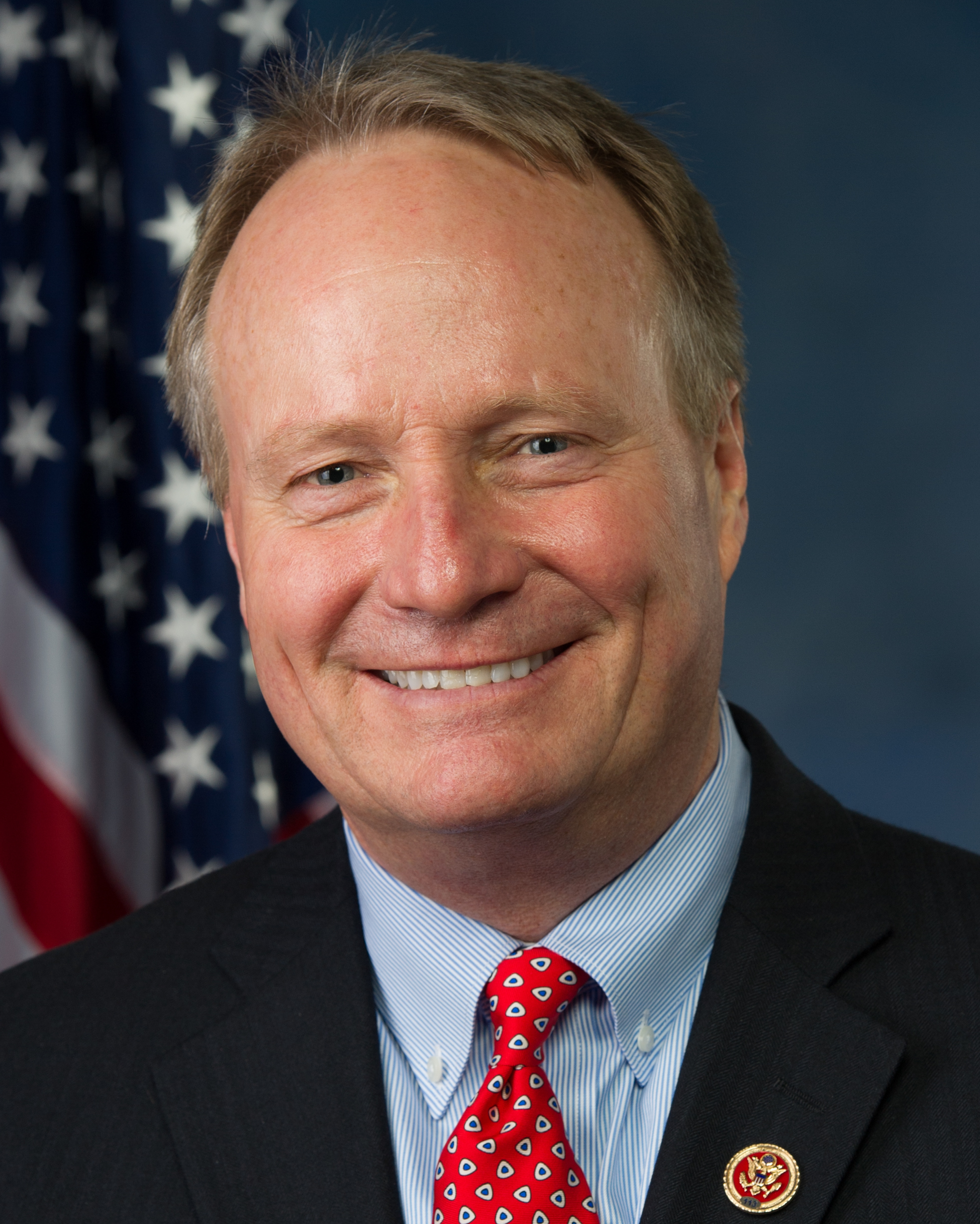

Nominee	David Joyce	Betsy Rader
Party	Republican	Democratic
Popular vote	169,809	137,549
Percentage	55.2%	44.6%
- Joyce: 50–60% 60–70% 70–80% Rader: 50–60% 60–70% 70–80% 80–90% >90% Tie: 50% No votes
U.S. Representative before election
David Joyce
Republican
Elected U.S. Representative
David Joyce
Republican

The 14th district is located in Northeast Ohio, taking in the eastern suburbs and exurbs of Cleveland, including Mayfield Heights, Solon, and Independence, as well as Ashtabula, Lake, and Geauga counties, northern Portage County, and northeastern Summit County. The incumbent was Republican David Joyce, who had represented the district since 2013. He was re-elected with 63% of the vote in 2016.

=== Republican primary ===
==== Candidates ====
===== Nominee =====
- David Joyce, incumbent U.S. Representative

==== Primary results ====
Republican primary results
Party	Candidate	Votes	%
Republican	David Joyce (incumbent)	49,986	100.00
Total votes		49,986	100.00

=== Democratic primary ===
==== Candidates ====
===== Nominee =====
- Betsy Rader, attorney

==== Primary results ====
Democratic primary results
Party	Candidate	Votes	%
Democratic	Betsy Rader	35,747	100
Total votes		35,747	100

=== General election ===
==== Endorsements ====
Betsy Rader (D)

Organizations

- EMILY's List
- End Citizens United
- MoveOn

==== Predictions ====
Source	Ranking	As of
The Cook Political Report	Likely R	November 5, 2018
Inside Elections	Likely R	November 5, 2018
Sabato's Crystal Ball	Lean R	November 5, 2018
RCP	Likely R	November 5, 2018
Daily Kos	Likely R	November 5, 2018
538	Likely R	November 7, 2018

==== Results ====
Ohio's 14th congressional district, 2018
Party	Candidate	Votes	%
Republican	David Joyce (incumbent)	169,809	55.2
Democratic	Betsy Rader	137,549	44.6
Total votes		307,358	100.0
Republican hold			

== District 15 ==
2018 Ohio's 15th congressional district election
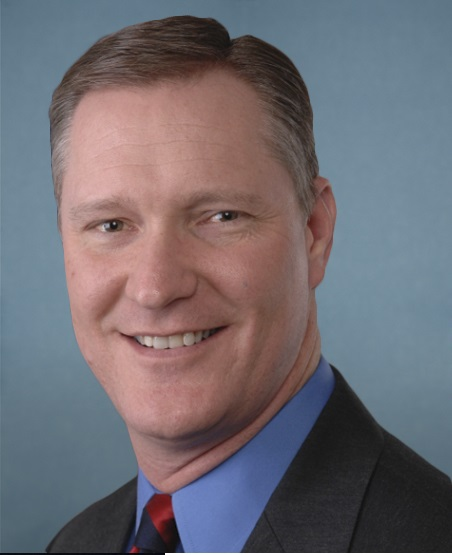

Nominee	Steve Stivers	Rick Neal
Party	Republican	Democratic
Popular vote	170,593	116,112
Percentage	58.3%	39.7%
- Stivers: 40–50% 50–60% 60–70% 70–80% 80–90% >90% Neal: 40–50% 50–60% 60–70% 70–80% 80–90% >90% Tie: 40–50% No votes
U.S. Representative before election
Steve Stivers
Republican
Elected U.S. Representative
Steve Stivers
Republican

The 15th district encompasses the southern Columbus metro area, taking in the western and eastern suburbs of Columbus, including Upper Arlington, Hilliard, and Grove City, as well as Athens. The incumbent was Republican Steve Stivers, who had represented the district since 2011. He was re-elected with 66% of the vote in 2016.

=== Republican primary ===
==== Candidates ====
===== Nominee =====
- Steve Stivers, incumbent U.S. Representative

==== Primary results ====
Republican primary results
Party	Candidate	Votes	%
Republican	Steve Stivers (incumbent)	49,220	100.00
Total votes		49,220	100.00

=== Democratic primary ===
==== Candidates ====
===== Nominee =====
- Rick Neal, former Peace Corps volunteer and international aid worker

===== Eliminated in primary =====
- Rob Jarvis, high school government teacher

==== Primary results ====
Democratic primary results
Party	Candidate	Votes	%
Democratic	Rick Neal	22,123	63.56
Democratic	Rob Jarvis	12,681	36.44
Total votes		34,804	100

=== Independents ===
- Johnathan Miller (Libertarian) (Note: Libertarian Party does not have ballot access. Appears on ballot as "Independent.")

=== General election ===
==== Endorsements ====
Rick Neal (D)

Organizations

- End Citizens United
- MoveOn

==== Predictions ====
Source	Ranking	As of
The Cook Political Report	Safe R	November 5, 2018
Inside Elections	Safe R	November 5, 2018
Sabato's Crystal Ball	Likely R	November 5, 2018
RCP	Safe R	November 5, 2018
Daily Kos	Safe R	November 5, 2018
538	Safe R	November 7, 2018

==== Results ====
Ohio's 15th congressional district, 2018
Party	Candidate	Votes	%
Republican	Steve Stivers (incumbent)	170,593	58.3
Democratic	Rick Neal	116,112	39.7
Libertarian	Jonathan Miller	5,738	2.0
Total votes		292,443	100.0
Republican hold			

== District 16 ==
2018 Ohio's 16th congressional district election
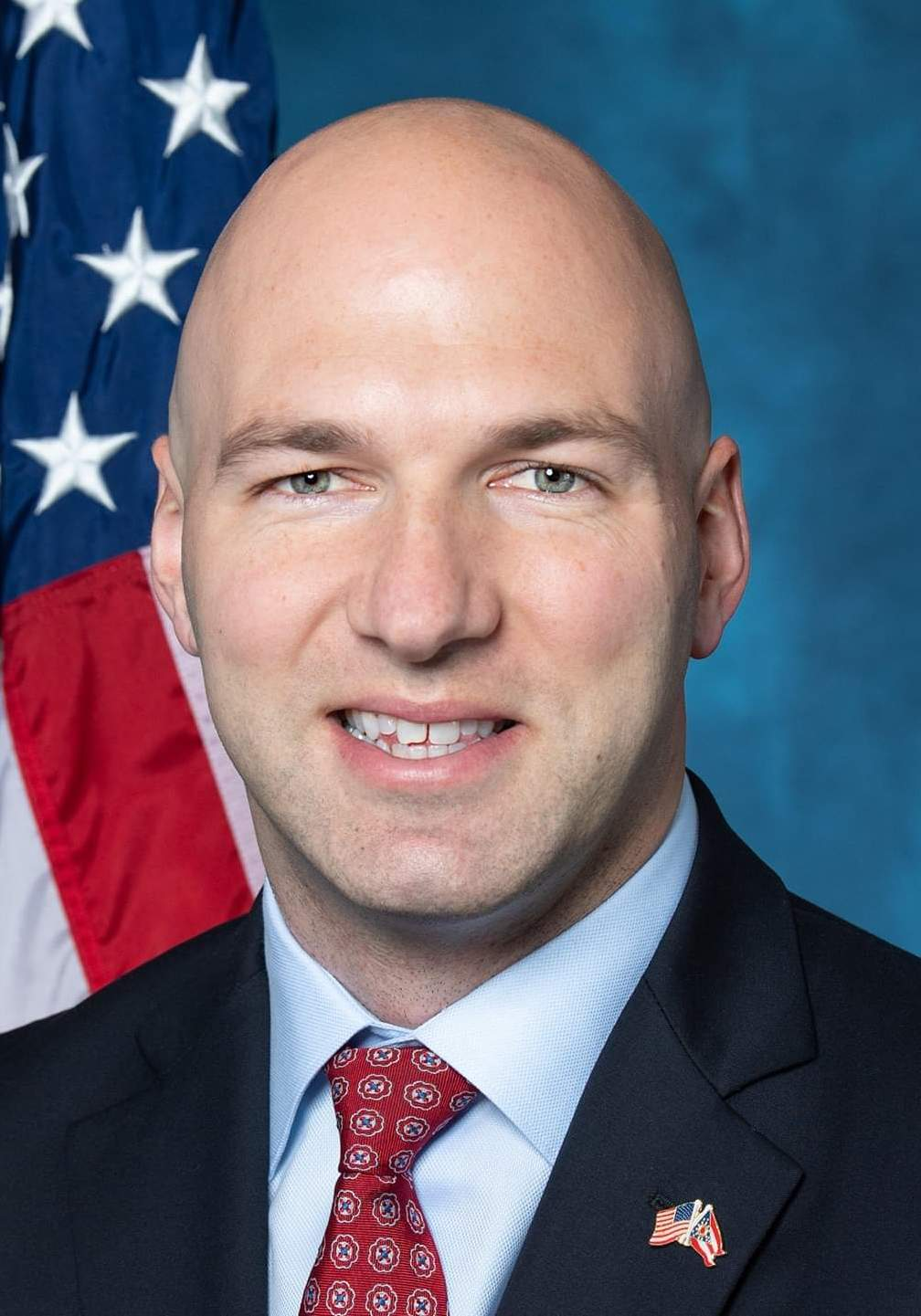

Nominee	Anthony Gonzalez	Susan Moran Palmer
Party	Republican	Democratic
Popular vote	170,029	129,681
Percentage	56.7%	43.3%
- Gonzalez: 50–60% 60–70% 70–80% 80–90% >90% Palmer: 50–60% 60–70% 70–80% No votes
U.S. Representative before election
Jim Renacci
Republican
Elected U.S. Representative
Anthony Gonzalez
Republican

The 16th district takes in the western suburbs of Cleveland, including Westlake, Parma, and Strongsville, as well Medina, Norton, and North Canton. The incumbent was Republican Jim Renacci, who had represented the district since 2011. He was re-elected with 65% of the vote in 2016. Renacci was running for U.S. Senate instead of re-election in 2018.

=== Republican primary ===
==== Candidates ====
===== Nominee =====
- Anthony Gonzalez, former NFL player

===== Eliminated in primary =====
- Michael Grusenmeyer, physician
- Christina Hagan, state representative

===== Withdrawn =====
- Darrell Hartman
- Tom Patton, state representative and former state senator

===== Declined =====
- Ron Amstutz, Wayne County Commissioner and former state representative
- Rob Frost, Chairman of the Cuyahoga County Republican Party
- Frank LaRose, State Senator (running for secretary of state)
- Larry Obhof, President of the Ohio Senate
- Jim Renacci, incumbent U.S. Representative (running for U.S. Senate)
- Kristina Roegner, state representative
- Mary Taylor, Lieutenant Governor of Ohio (running for governor)
- Jane Timken, Chairman of the Ohio Republican Party
- Scott Wiggam, state representative

==== Endorsements ====
Anthony Gonzalez

U.S. Senators

- Marco Rubio, U.S. Senator from Florida

U.S. Representatives

- Bob Gibbs, U.S. Representative (OH-7)

Newspapers

- The Plain Dealer
Christina Hagan
- Jan Brewer, former Arizona Governor
- Wayne Dupree, radio host
- Sebastian Gorka, former deputy assistant to President Trump
- Jim Jordan, congressman (OH-4)
- Mark Meadows, congressman (NC-11)
- Anthony Scaramucci, former White House Communications Director
- Darrell C. Scott, pastor
- Joe Walsh, former congressman and radio host
- Ron Young, state representative
- Tom Zawistowski, president of the We the People Convention

Organizations

- Cuyahoga Valley Republicans
- Family Research Council
- First Freedom Ohio
- NRA Political Victory Fund
- Ohio Value Voters
- Students for Trump
- Susan B. Anthony List
- Veterans for Trump

==== Primary results ====
Republican primary results
Party	Candidate	Votes	%
Republican	Anthony Gonzalez	34,056	53.06
Republican	Christina Hagan	26,185	40.79
Republican	Michael Grusenmeyer	3,946	6.15
Total votes		64,187	100

=== Democratic primary ===
==== Candidates ====
===== Nominee =====
- Susan Moran Palmer, health industry professional

===== Eliminated in primary =====
- Mark Dent, attorney and U.S. Army veteran
- Aaron Godfrey, scientist
- Grant Goodrich, head of the Great Lakes Energy Institute at Case Western Reserve University and U.S. Marine Corp veteran
- Jennifer Herold, occupational therapist
- T.J. Mulloy, insurance and investment broker
- John Wilson

===== Declined =====
- Dean DePiero, former mayor of Parma and former state representative
- Betty Sutton, former administrator of the Saint Lawrence Seaway Development Corporation and former U.S. Representative (running for lieutenant governor)

==== Primary results ====
Democratic primary results
Party	Candidate	Votes	%
Democratic	Susan Moran Palmer	14,361	34.64
Democratic	Grant Goodrich	11,621	28.03
Democratic	T.J. Mulloy	6,462	15.58
Democratic	Mark Dent	3,902	9.41
Democratic	Aaron Godfrey	3,262	7.87
Democratic	John Wilson	1,855	4.47
Total votes		41,463	100

=== General election ===
==== Debate ====
2018 Ohio's 16th congressional district debate
No.	Date	Host	Moderator	Link	Republican	Democratic
Key: P Participant A Absent N Not invited I Invited W Withdrawn						
Key: P Participant A Absent N Not invited I Invited W Withdrawn					Anthony Gonzalez	Susan Moran Palmer
1	Oct. 29, 2018	City Club of Cleveland	Rick Jackson		P	P

==== Predictions ====
Source	Ranking	As of
The Cook Political Report	Safe R	November 5, 2018
Inside Elections	Safe R	November 5, 2018
Sabato's Crystal Ball	Safe R	November 5, 2018
RCP	Safe R	November 5, 2018
Daily Kos	Safe R	November 5, 2018
538	Likely R	November 7, 2018

==== Results ====
Ohio's 16th congressional district, 2018
Party	Candidate	Votes	%
Republican	Anthony Gonzalez	170,029	56.7
Democratic	Susan Moran Palmer	129,681	43.3
Total votes		299,710	100.0
Republican hold			

== See also ==
- 2018 United States House of Representatives elections
- 2018 United States elections
