= 2018 Ohio's 12th congressional district special election =

- August 7, 2018

Ohio's 12th congressional district
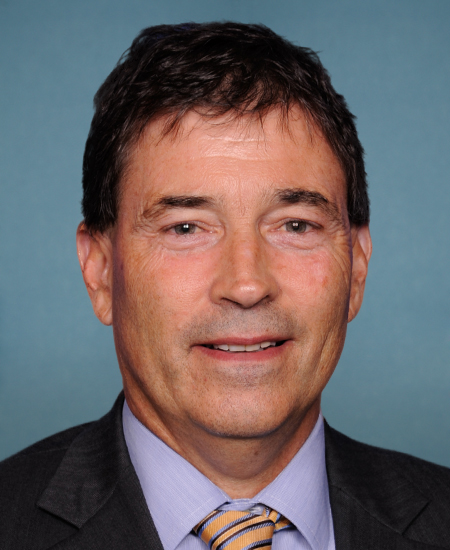

Nominee	Troy Balderson	Danny O'Connor
Party	Republican	Democratic
Popular vote	104,328	102,648
Percentage	50.12%	49.32%
- Balderson: 40–50% 50–60% 60–70% 70–80% 80–90% O'Connor: 40–50% 50–60% 60–70% 70–80% 80–90% >90% Tie: 40–50%
U.S. Representative before election
Pat Tiberi
Republican
Elected U.S. Representative
Troy Balderson
Republican

A special election for Ohio's 12th congressional district was held on August 7, 2018, following the resignation of Republican U.S. Representative Pat Tiberi. The Republican Party nominated State Senator Troy Balderson for the seat while the Democratic Party nominated Franklin County Recorder Danny O'Connor. Balderson led O'Connor in preliminary results; however, the race was not officially called on election night. Counting of outstanding ballots began on August 18 and was completed on August 24. The outstanding ballots did not change the margin enough to trigger an automatic recount, so Balderson was declared the winner on August 24.

== Background ==
On October 19, 2017, nine-term incumbent Republican representative Pat Tiberi announced that he would leave office before January 31, 2018, in order to lead the Ohio Business Roundtable. On January 3, 2018, he announced that he would officially resign on January 15. On January 5, Ohio Governor John Kasich set the primaries for the special election for May 8, and the general election for August 7. The winner of this special election would serve for five months until January 2019, unless also elected in the regularly scheduled November general election.

Ohio's 12th congressional district at the time was located in the central portion of the state and included all of Delaware, Licking, and Morrow counties, as well as portions of Franklin, Marion, Muskingum, and Richland counties. The district had been in Republican hands for all but one term since 1939, and without interruption since 1983.

== Republican primary ==
=== Candidates ===
==== Nominee ====
- Troy Balderson, state senator

==== Eliminated in primary ====
- Kevin Bacon, state senator
- Lawrence Cohen, accountant
- Jon Halverstadt, real estate investor
- Tim Kane, economist, former Air Force intelligence officer
- Melanie Leneghan, Liberty Township trustee
- Pat Manley, architect
- Carol O'Brien, Delaware County Prosecutor

==== Declined ====
- Andrew Brenner, state representative (running for state senate)
- Anne Gonzales, state representative (running for state senate)
- John Kasich, governor and former U.S. representative
- Clarence Mingo, Franklin County Auditor (endorsed Kevin Bacon)
- JD Vance, author and venture capitalist, future Vice President of the United States

=== Endorsements ===
Kevin Bacon

Local and statewide politicians

- Clarence Mingo, Franklin County Auditor

Organizations

- Franklin County Republican Party
- Ohio Right to Life PAC
Tim Kane

Individuals

- Carly Fiorina, former presidential candidate

Federal politicians

- George P. Shultz, former United States Secretary of State (1982–1989)
Melanie Leneghan

Federal politicians

- Jim Jordan, U.S. representative (R-OH)

Local and statewide politicians

- Nancy DeNutte, Liberty Township Fiscal Officer
- Joe Garrett, Concord Township trustee
- Mike Gemperline, Liberty Township trustee
- Kris Jordan, state senator
- Lisa Knapp, Orange Township trustee
- Linda Reidelbach, former state representative
- Ryan Rivers, Orange Township trustee

Organizations

- First Freedom Ohio
- House Freedom Caucus
- Ohio Right to Life PAC
- Right to Life Action Coalition of Ohio
- We the People Convention
Carol O'Brien

Local and statewide politicians

- Chris Bauserman, Delaware County Engineer
- Jeff Benton, Delaware County Commissioner
- Natalie Fravel, Delaware County Clerk of Courts
- Mark Hickman, Delaware County Coroner
- George Kaitsa, Delaware County Auditor
- Barb Lewis, Delaware County Commissioner
- Russ Martin, Delaware County sheriff
- Jon Peterson, Delaware County Treasurer
- Dave Yost, Ohio Auditor

=== Polling ===
Poll source	Date(s) administered	Sample size	Margin of error	John Adams	Kevin Bacon	Troy Balderson	Gary Chiero	Lawrence Cohen	Jonathan Halverstadt	Tim Kane	Melanie Leneghan	Pat Manley	Carol O'Brien	Mick Shoemaker
Public Opinion Strategies (R-Balderson)	April 15–16, 2018	300	± 5.7%	0%	10%	17%	0%	0%	2%	10%	11%	1%	7%	1%

=== Results ===
Results by county: Balderson—70–80% Balderson—30–40% Leneghan—30–40% Leneghan—40–50% Bacon—<30%

Ohio's 12th congressional district special Republican primary, 2018
Party	Candidate	Votes	%
Republican	Troy Balderson	20,101	29.22
Republican	Melanie Leneghan	19,437	28.25
Republican	Tim Kane	11,743	17.07
Republican	Kevin Bacon	9,819	14.27
Republican	Carol O'Brien	4,406	6.40
Republican	Jon Halverstadt	998	1.45
Republican	Lawrence Cohen	807	1.17
Republican	Mick Shoemaker	750	1.09
Republican	Pat Manley	741	1.08
Total votes		68,802	100

== Democratic primary ==
=== Candidates ===
==== Nominee ====
- Danny O'Connor, Franklin County Recorder

==== Eliminated in primary ====
- Ed Albertson, businessman and nominee for OH-12 in 2016
- Jackie Patton, nurse
- John Peters, special education teacher
- John Russell, farmer and nominee for state representative in 2016
- Zach Scott, former Franklin County Sheriff
- Doug Wilson, health care professional

==== Withdrew ====
- Crystal Lett, healthcare advocate

==== Declined ====
- Jeremy Blake, Newark city councilman (running for state representative)
- Jay Goyal, former state representative and small business owner

=== Endorsements ===
John Russell

Federal politicians

- Mary Jo Kilroy, former U.S. representative

Local and state politicians

- Valerie Cumming, Westerville City councilwoman
- Marian Harris, former Ohio state representative
- Connie Pillich, former state representative and Ohio gubernatorial candidate

Organizations

- Delaware County Young Democrats
Zach Scott

Local and statewide politicians

- Dallas Baldwin, Franklin County sheriff

=== Results ===
Results by county: O'Connor—40–50% O'Connor—30–40% O'Connor—<30%

Ohio's 12th congressional district special Democratic primary, 2018
Party	Candidate	Votes	%
Democratic	Danny O'Connor	18,422	40.94
Democratic	Zach Scott	7,554	16.76
Democratic	John Russell	7,515	16.70
Democratic	Jackie Patton	6,111	13.58
Democratic	Ed Albertson	3,638	8.08
Democratic	Doug Wilson	1,771	3.94
Total votes		45,011	100.0

== Independents ==
=== Candidates ===
==== Withdrawn ====
- Jonathan Veley, attorney

== General election ==
=== Candidates ===
- Troy Balderson (Republican), state senator
- Joe Manchik (Green), small business owner
- Danny O'Connor (Democratic), Franklin County Recorder

=== Predictions ===
Source	Ranking	As of
The Cook Political Report	Tossup	May 2, 2018
Inside Elections/Rothenberg Political Report	Tilt R	May 4, 2018
Sabato's Crystal Ball	Tossup	July 24, 2018

=== Endorsements ===
Troy Balderson (R)

Federal officials

- Bob Gibbs, U.S. representative
- Jim Jordan, U.S. representative
- Mike Pence, vice president of the United States
- Rob Portman, U.S. senator (R-OH)
- Jim Renacci, U.S. representative (R-OH) and Republican Nominee for U.S. Senate in 2018
- Steve Stivers, U.S. representative
- Pat Tiberi, former U.S. representative (R-OH)
- Donald Trump, president of the United States
- Brad Wenstrup, U.S. representative (R-OH)

Local and statewide politicians

- David Burke, state senator
- Rick Carfagna, state representative
- Mike DeWine, Ohio Attorney General
- Keith Faber, state representative
- Jay Hottinger, state senator
- Jon Husted, Ohio Secretary of State
- John Kasich, governor of Ohio
- Frank LaRose, state senator
- Larry Obhof, president of the Ohio Senate
- Dorothy Pelanda, state representative
- Scott Ryan, state representative
- Robert Sprague, state representative
- Mary Taylor, lieutenant governor of Ohio
- Dave Yost, State Auditor

Individuals

- Anthony Gonzalez, candidate for Congress (OH-16)
- Hugh Hewitt, radio host
- Tim Kane, economist, former Air Force intelligence office and candidate
- Ronna McDaniel, chair of the Republican National Committee
- Bob Paduchik, co-chair of the Republican National Committee
- Jane Timken, chair of the Ohio Republican Party
- Donald Trump Jr., businessman and son of U.S. President Donald Trump
- Eric Trump, philanthropist and son of U.S. President Donald Trump

Organizations

- National Federation of Independent Business
- NRA Political Victory Fund
- Ohio Restaurant Association
- Ohio Right to Life
- Ohio State Medical Association
- Tea Party Express
- U.S. Chamber of Commerce
Danny O'Connor (D)

Federal officials

- Joyce Beatty, U.S. representative (D-OH)
- Joe Biden, former vice president of the United States
- Sherrod Brown, U.S. senator (D-OH)
- Richard Cordray, former director of the Consumer Financial Protection Bureau
- Steve Dettelbach, former U.S. attorney
- Doug Jones, U.S. senator (D-AL)
- Conor Lamb, U.S. representative (D-PA)
- Jeff Merkley, U.S. senator (D-OR)
- Tim Ryan, U.S. representative (D-OH)
- Adam Schiff, U.S. representative (D-CA)
- Zack Space, former U.S. representative (D-OH)
- Betty Sutton, former U.S. representative (D-OH)

Local and statewide politicians

- Kristin Boggs, state representative
- Kevin Boyce, Franklin County Commissioner
- Elizabeth Brown, Columbus City councilmember
- Marilyn Brown, Franklin County Commissioner
- Don Bryant, Mansfield City Council At‐Large member
- Kathleen Clyde, state representative
- Hearcel Craig, state representative
- Andrew Ginther, mayor of Columbus, OH
- Shannon Hardin, president of the Columbus City Council
- Megan Kilgore, Columbus City Auditor
- Zach Klein, Columbus City Attorney
- David Leland, state representative
- Adam Miller, state representative
- John O'Grady, Franklin County Commissioner
- Martin O'Malley, former governor of Maryland
- Maryellen O'Shaughnessy, Franklin County Clerk of Courts
- Garnetta Pender, Mansfield City councilmember
- Phillip Scott, Mansfield City Council president
- Michael Stinziano, Columbus City councilmember and former state representative
- Ted Strickland, former governor of Ohio and former U.S. representative (D-OH)
- Marty Walsh, mayor of Boston, MA

Individuals

- Valerie Bertinelli, actress and television personality
- Misha Collins, actor
- Billy Eichner, television personality
- Tim Guinee, actor
- Fred Guttenberg, activist
- Chelsea Handler, actress
- John Legend, singer-songwriter
- Joshua Malina, actor
- Christopher Meloni, actor
- Debra Messing, actress
- Alyssa Milano, actress and activist
- Adam Parkhomenko, political strategist
- David Pepper, chair of the Ohio Democratic Party
- Piper Perabo, actress
- Tom Perez, chair of the Democratic National Committee
- Sarah Silverman, actress and comedian
- Randi Mayem Singer, screenwriter and producer
- George Takei, actor and activist
- Neera Tanden, policy advisor
- Andrew Zimmern, television personality
- Danny Zuker, television producer

Labor unions

- International Association of Sheet Metal, Air, Rail and Transportation Workers
- International Union of Painters and Allied Trades District 6
- Service Employees International Union District 1199

Organizations

- Democratic Progressives of Ohio
- End Citizens United
- Franklin County Democratic Party
- Giffords PAC
- Human Rights Campaign
- League of Conservation Voters Action Fund
- NARAL Pro-Choice America
- Ohio Democratic Party
- Ohio State University College Democrats
- Planned Parenthood Advocates of Ohio

Newspapers and news websites

- The Columbus Dispatch

=== Polling ===
Poll source	Date(s) administered	Sample size	Margin of error	Troy Balderson (R)	Danny O'Connor (D)	Joe Manchik (G)	Other	Undecided
Emerson College	August 2–4, 2018	431	± 5.0%	46%	47%	–	–	7%
Monmouth University	July 26–31, 2018	512	± 4.3%	44%	43%	2%	0%	11%
Public Policy Polling (D-End Citizens United)	July 27–29, 2018	617	± 4.0%	48%	44%	–	–	–
GBA Strategies (D-O'Connor)	July 23–25, 2018	500	± 4.4%	48%	45%	2%	–	–
GBA Strategies (D-O'Connor)	July 10–13, 2018	600	± 4.0%	48%	43%	5%	–	–
JMC Analytics	June 13–16, 2018	500	± 4.4%	46%	35%	1%	–	18%
GBA Strategies (D-O'Connor)	June 9–12, 2018	500	± 4.4%	48%	41%	4%	–	–
Monmouth University	June 7–10, 2018	501	± 4.4%	43%	33%	1%	2%	21%
Public Policy Polling (D-End Citizens United)	May 10–11, 2018	625	± 3.9%	45%	43%	–	–	11%

Hypothetical polling

Poll source	Date(s) administered	Sample size	Margin of error	Generic Republican	Generic Democrat	Undecided
GBA Strategies (D-O'Connor)	July 23–25, 2018	500	± 4.4%	50%	46%	–

=== Results ===
Ohio's 12th congressional district special election, 2018
Party	Candidate	Votes	%	±%
Republican	Troy Balderson	104,328	50.12%	−16.43%
Democratic	Danny O'Connor	102,648	49.32%	+19.48%
Green	Joe Manchik	1,165	0.56%	−3.01%
Total votes		208,141	100.0%	N/A
Republican hold				

O'Connor dominated the district's portion of Franklin County, home to the largest share of the district's population. However, he could not overcome a 4,800-vote deficit in normally heavily Republican Delaware County, the largest whole county in the district. Still, this was the closest that a Democrat had come to winning the district since 1982.

=== County results ===
Vote breakdown by county
	Troy Balderson Republican		Danny O'Connor Democrat		Joe Manchik Green		Total
County	Votes	%	Votes	%	Votes	%	Votes
Delaware	32,576	53.97%	27,548	45.64%	240	0.40%	60,364
Franklin	25,209	34.45%	47,639	65.10%	328	0.45%	73,176
Licking	24,340	60.72%	15,443	38.52%	304	0.76%	40,087
Marion	1,236	68.33%	560	30.96%	13	0.72%	1,809
Morrow	5,225	69.99%	2,173	29.11%	67	0.90%	7,465
Muskingum	7,928	66.43%	3,902	32.69%	105	0.88%	11,935
Richland	7,814	58.73%	5,383	40.46%	108	0.81%	13,305
