= Troy Balderson =

American politician and businessman (born 1962)

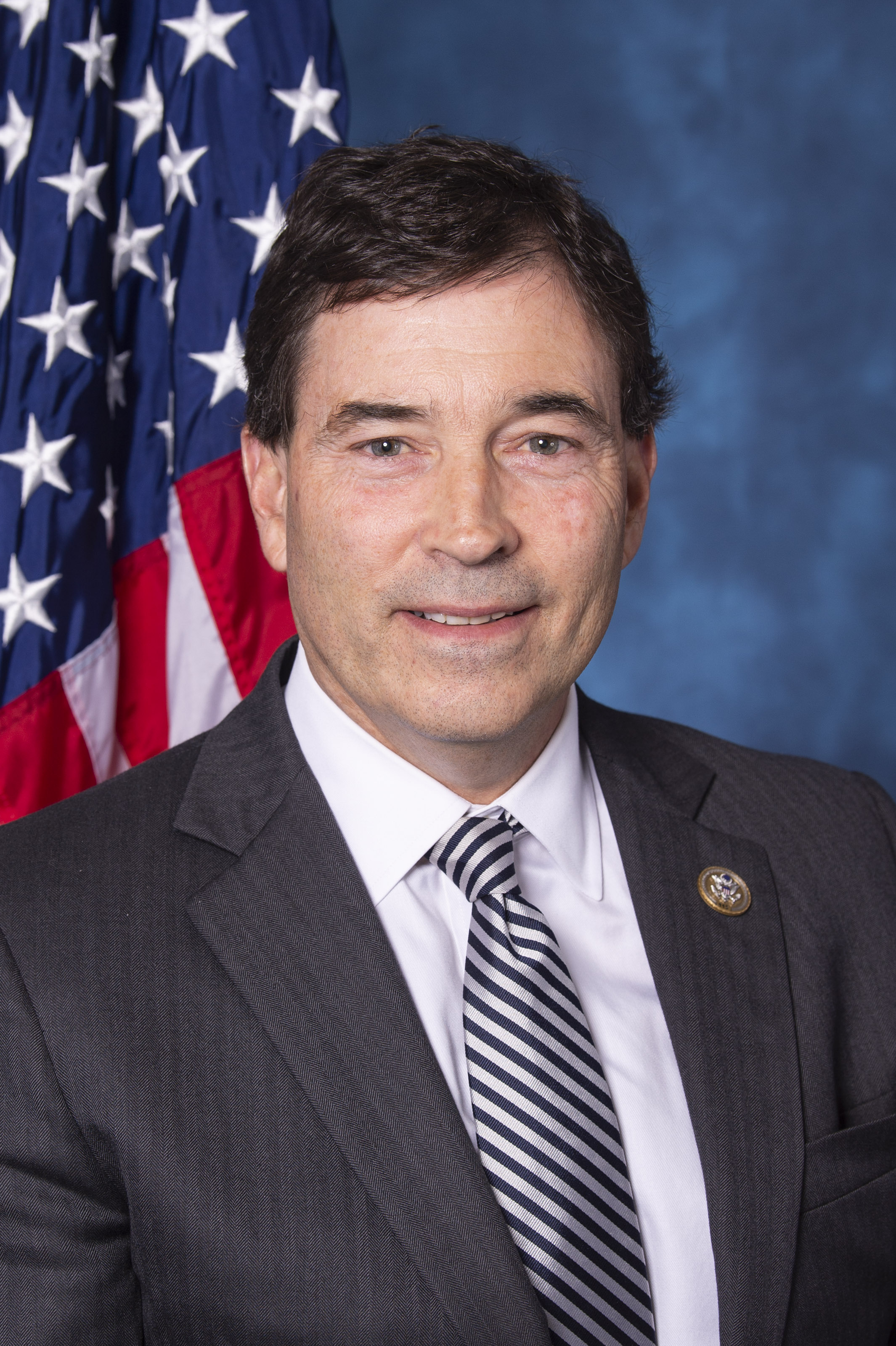
- Official portrait, c. 2019

Member of the U.S. House of Representatives from Ohio's 12th district
- Incumbent
- Assumed office August 7, 2018 (Note: Balderson's official service begins on the date of the special election, while he was not sworn in until September 5, 2018.)
- Preceded by: Pat Tiberi

Member of the Ohio Senate from the 20th district
- In office July 13, 2011 – September 5, 2018
- Preceded by: Jimmy Stewart
- Succeeded by: Brian Hill

Member of the Ohio House of Representatives from the 94th district
- In office January 5, 2009 – July 13, 2011
- Preceded by: Jim Aslanides
- Succeeded by: Brian Hill

Personal details
- Born: William Troy Balderson; January 16, 1962 (age 64) Zanesville, Ohio, U.S.
- Party: Republican
- Spouse: Angela Mattingly (m. 1985; div. 2014)
- Children: 1
- Education: Muskingum University (attended); Ohio State University (attended)
- Website: House website Campaign website
- Balderson's voice Balderson supporting the ADAPT Act. Recorded July 20, 2026

William Troy Balderson (born January 16, 1962) is an American politician and businessman serving as the U.S. representative from Ohio's 12th congressional district since 2018. He served as an Ohio state senator representing the 20th district from 2011 until his election to Congress. A member of the Republican Party, he was a member of the Ohio House of Representatives from 2009 to 2011.

== Early life and education ==
Born and raised in southeastern Ohio, Balderson graduated from Zanesville High School in 1980 and attended both Muskingum College and the Ohio State University, but did not graduate. He lives in Zanesville.

== Early career ==
Balderson started working for his family's car business, Balderson Motor Sales, as a mechanic while a college student. He was vice president and general manager of the company from 1987 to 2008, the third generation of his family to run the business; his father had been in charge for a half-century. In financial disclosure statements, Balderson said he had no income from the car company since 2008; the company closed in February 2018.

=== Ohio General Assembly ===
==== House ====
When incumbent Jim Aslanides became term-limited, Balderson sought the Republican nomination for state representative of the 94th Ohio House District. He won the March 2008 primary with 67.6% of the vote. In the November general election, Balderson won with 54.01% of the vote.

Balderson ran unopposed for reelection in 2010. While a member of the Ohio House of Representatives, he was on the House Finance Committee and chaired the Subcommittee on Agriculture and Natural Resources. In early 2010, Balderson proposed legislation that would subject Ohio Medicaid recipients to random drug tests in order to receive state benefits.

==== Senate ====
In late May 2011, State Senator Jimmy Stewart announced that he planned to resign his seat in the 20th Senate District as of June 30, the end of the fiscal year. Stewart continued his service as majority floor leader until he resigned.

On July 12, 2011, Senate President Tom Niehaus announced that Balderson would be appointed to the vacant Senate seat. He was sworn into office on July 13, 2011. On November 6, 2012, Balderson won a full four-year Senate term, defeating Democrat Teresa Scarmack with 59.79% of the vote.

Balderson was selected in 2014 as co-chair of a special legislative committee to review Ohio's renewable energy and energy efficiency regulations, and chaired the Senate Energy and Natural Resources Committee.

In 2016, Balderson ran unopposed for reelection. Because of term limits, he was ineligible to run again in 2020. He decided to run for Congress, to represent Ohio's 12th congressional district.

==== Committee assignments ====
- Energy and Natural Resources (chair)
- Finance
- Government Oversight & Reform
- Public Utilities
- Finance Subcommittee on Primary & Secondary Education
- Joint Committee on Agency Rule Review

== U.S. House of Representatives ==
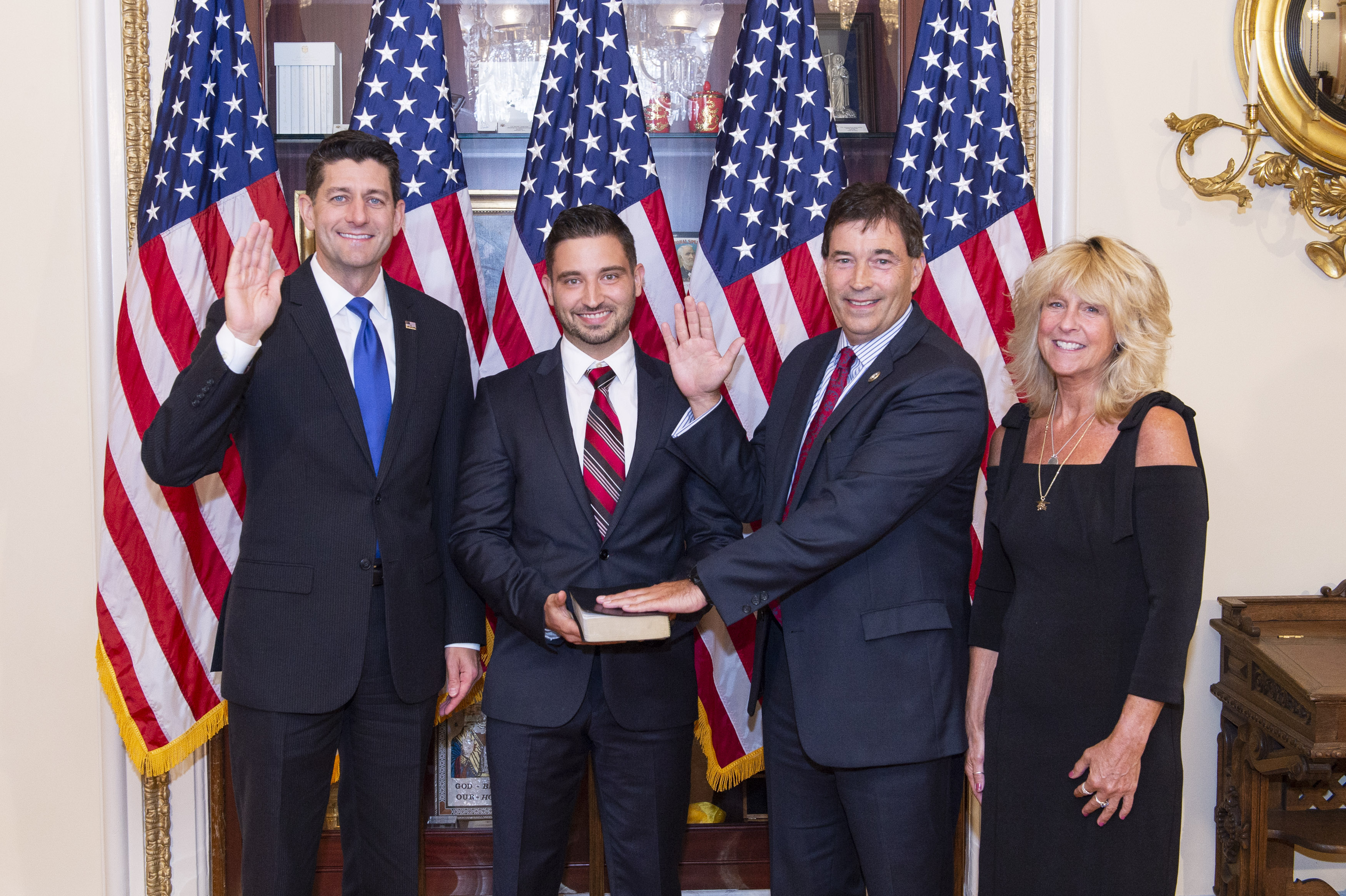
Balderson being sworn into office by Speaker Paul Ryan on September 5, 2018

=== Elections ===
==== 2018 special ====
Balderson was the Republican nominee for Ohio's 12th congressional district in an August 7, 2018 special election triggered by the January 2018 resignation of Representative Pat Tiberi. He narrowly won the May Republican primary, with 20,101 votes (29.2%) to second-place finisher Melanie Leneghan's 19,437. Leneghan sued, asking to be declared the winner because of voting irregularities. The Ohio Supreme Court dismissed her suit in August 2018.

In the August election, Balderson faced Democratic nominee Danny O'Connor. On election night, the results were too close to call; Balderson was officially certified as the winner on August 24. After the remaining absentee and provisional ballots were counted, Balderson won by 1,680 votes (0.8%), and was sworn into office on September 5.

==== 2018 general ====
In the November general election, Balderson defeated O'Connor in a rematch of the district's August special election, with 51.6% of the vote to O'Connor's 47.1%.

==== 2020 ====
Balderson sought reelection and defeated the Democratic nominee, businesswoman Alaina Shearer, with 55.2% of the vote to Shearer's 41.8%.

=== Tenure ===
On July 19, 2022, Balderson voted against the Respect for Marriage Act, a bill that would protect the right to gay marriage at a federal level.

Balderson voted to provide Israel with support following 2023 Hamas attack on Israel.

=== Committee assignments ===
- Committee on Science, Space, and Technology
  - Subcommittee on Oversight
  - Subcommittee on Research and Technology
- Committee on Small Business
  - Subcommittee on Agriculture, Energy and Trade
  - Subcommittee on Economic Growth, Tax and Capital Access

=== Caucus memberships ===
- Republican Governance Group
- Republican Study Committee
- Republican Main Street Partnership
- Congressional Western Caucus
- House Automotive Caucus
- Congressional Motorcycle Caucus Co-Chair
- General Aviation Caucus
- Air Cargo Caucus
- Suburban Caucus
- Vision Caucus
- CTE Caucus
- Apprenticeship Caucus
- Smart Cities Caucus
- Community Health Centers Caucus
- Beef Caucus
- Congressional Taiwan Caucus
- Travel & Tourism Caucus
- Congressional Appalachian National Scenic Trail Caucus
- Congressional Grid Innovation Caucus
- Congressional Ohio River Basin Caucus
- Congressional Rural Caucus
- Congressional Second Amendment Caucus
- Congressional Small Business Caucus
- Auto Performance & Motorsports Caucus
- Congressional Motorsports Caucus
- Community College Caucus
- Auto Care Caucus
- Army Caucus
- Boating Caucus
- ALS Caucus
- Civility & Respect Caucus
- Manufacturing Caucus
- Congressional Study Group on Japan (FMC)
- Caucus on the Deadliest Cancers
- Franchise Caucus
- Veterans Education Caucus
- USO Caucus
- Appalachian National Scenic Trail Caucus
- Congressional Agritourism Caucus
- Macedonian American Caucus
- Women in STEM Caucus
- Congenital Heart Disease Congressional Caucus
- Cut Flower Caucus
- Congressional Telehealth Caucus
- Congressional Critical Materials Caucus
- Defense Industrial Base Caucus

== Personal life ==
Balderson and his ex-wife Angela have a son. They divorced in 2014.

== Electoral history ==
Election results
| Year | Office | Election | Votes for Balderson | % | Opponent | Party | Votes | % |
|---|---|---|---|---|---|---|---|---|
| 2008 | Ohio House of Representatives | General | 27,917 | 54% | Jennifer Stewart | Democratic | 23,628 | 46% |
| 2010 | Ohio House of Representatives | Primary | 28,236 | 100% | Unopposed | | | |
| 2012 | Ohio Senate | General | 87,755 | 60% | Teresa Scarmack | Democratic | 59,012 | 40% |
| 2016 | Ohio Senate | Primary | 48,059 | 100% | Unopposed | | | |
| 2018 | United States House of Representatives | Special | 101,772 | 50% | Danny O'Connor | Democratic | 100,208 | 49% |
| 2018 | United States House of Representatives | General | 171,757 | 51.6% | Danny O'Connor | Democratic | 156,863 | 47.1% |
| 2020 | United States House of Representatives | General | 241,790 | 55.2% | Alaina Shearer | Democratic | 182,847 | 41.8% |
| 2022 | United States House of Representatives | General | 191,344 | 69.3% | Amy Rippel-Elton | Democratic | 84,893 | 30.7% |
| 2024 | United States House of Representatives | General | 260,450 | 68.5% | Jerrad Christian | Democratic | 119,738 | 31.5% |

U.S. House of Representatives
| Preceded by Pat Tiberi | Member of the U.S. House of Representatives from Ohio's 12th congressional district 2018–present | Incumbent |
U.S. order of precedence (ceremonial)
| Preceded by Michael Cloud | United States representatives by seniority 183rd | Succeeded by Kevin Hern |
