= Marian Harris =

American politician

Member of the Ohio House of Representatives from the 19th district
- In office January 5, 2009-December 31, 2010
- Preceded by: Larry L. Flowers
- Succeeded by: Anne Gonzales

Personal details
- Born: New York, New York
- Party: Democratic
- Education: Mount Holyoke College, Ohio Dominican University
- Profession: Educator, Medical Researcher, Legislative Aide

Marian Harris is a Democratic politician who served in the Ohio House of Representatives from 2009 - 2010, representing the 19th district.

A former educator and aide to United States Senator Howard Metzenbaum, Harris ran against Representative Larry L. Flowers in 2006 for a seat in the Ohio House of Representatives. Although unsuccessful in her first attempt, Harris performed better than what was expected, coming very close to ousting Flowers. As a result, she tried again for the seat two years later, in 2008.

With Flowers out of the seat due to term limits, Harris was seen as a potential victor in obtaining a seat that had been held long by Republicans, including former Republican Speaker of the House Jo Ann Davidson. Harris faced newcomer Brad Lewis, in the general election, in what became a very contested race. The race wasn't decided until a month after election day. After all provisional ballots had been tallied, Harris was announced the winner over Lewis by 735 votes. She went on to take her seat on January 5, 2009.

In the House, Harris was often one of the more liberal members of the delegation, supporting labor, anti-bias, domestic violence, children's issues and other Democratic initiatives. As a result, Harris quickly became a top tier target for Republicans for the 2010 cycle. For their candidate, Republicans ran Anne Gonzales a popular mayor of Westerville, Ohio with conservative credentials. Again, Harris was in one of the more contested and closest watched races of the year.

Within an overwhelmingly Republican year, Harris was defeated by Gonzales, and the Democrats lost their majority in the Ohio House. As a result, Harris was a one-term Representative.

Following her defeat, Harris remained in Columbus, where she is working to elect other Democratic candidates and serving as co-president of the National Council of Jewish Women Columbus while looking for employment.

Harris entered the 2017 race for the Columbus City Council, but withdrew her nomination in February 2017.
