= Ken Harbaugh =

Nonprofit executive, retired U.S. Navy pilot, political candidate

Personal details
- Born: December 15, 1973 (age 52) Colorado Springs, Colorado, U.S.
- Party: Democratic
- Education: Duke University (BA); Yale University (JD)

Military service
- Allegiance: United States
- Branch/service: United States Navy
- Years of service: 1996–2005
- Rank: Lieutenant
- Commands: Electronic Warfare Mission Commander; Combat Reconnaissance Crew Mission Commander
- Battles/wars: Operation Enduring Freedom
- Awards: Navy Commendation Medal; Navy Achievement Medal (2)

Ken Harbaugh (born December 15, 1973) is a former United States Navy pilot, nonprofit executive, and author. Harbaugh was the Democratic Party nominee for the U.S. House of Representatives seat to represent Ohio's 7th congressional district in the 2018 election.

== Early life, education, and military service ==
Harbaugh, who grew up in a military family, earned a bachelor of science degree from Duke University in 1996 and a juris doctor degree from Yale Law School in 2008. He studied at Oxford University while an undergraduate at Duke. He served for nine years in the United States Navy as a naval aviator. His qualifications include Electronic Warfare Aircraft Commander. He was the lead pilot of an EP-3A Aries II electronic reconnaissance aircraft.

In 2015, Harbaugh wrote an opinion piece in The New York Times, criticizing what he regards as a lax U.S. Department of Veterans Affairs disability compensation program.

Ken Harbaugh was the 2020 Hooah Award winner, given annually to an American veteran "who defines citizenship through service to our country, both in uniform and beyond". His writing on civil-military affairs has appeared in The Atlantic, The New York Times, The Bulwark, and Yale Journal of International Law. He served as a commentator for National Public Radio and as host for Crooked Media's Reclaiming Patriotism. He currently hosts several podcasts, including Warriors in Their Own Words, and Burn the Boats, which received a 2021 Ambies nomination for best political podcast of the year.

== Nonprofit career ==
In 2007, Harbaugh co-founded The Mission Continues, a nonprofit focusing on veterans issues, with Eric Greitens, who went on to become the Republican governor of Missouri. The Mission Continues was chronicled in Joe Klein's book Charlie Mike, which detailed the efforts of Harbaugh, Greitens, and others to raise money for and then staff their organization.

He is the former president of Team Rubicon, a nonprofit that deploys military veterans worldwide as emergency first responders.

== Publications ==
His writing on civil-military affairs has appeared in The Atlantic, The Bulwark, The New York Times, and the Yale Journal of International Law. He hosts several podcasts, including Warriors in Their Own Words, and Burn the Boats, which received a 2021 Ambies nomination for best political podcast of the year.

He released videos via his Substack website, The Ken Harbaugh Show.

== Personal life ==
Harbaugh and his wife, Annmarie, have two daughters and a son. In 2009, the family moved from Connecticut to Chagrin Falls, Ohio, and then moved to California in 2014. They moved back to Ohio in 2016.
