= Anne Gonzales =

American politician

Member of the Ohio House of Representatives from the 19th district
- In office January 3, 2011 – January 7, 2019
- Preceded by: Marian Harris
- Succeeded by: Mary Lightbody

Personal details
- Born: August 12, 1963 (age 63) Columbus, Ohio, U.S.
- Party: Republican
- Education: Otterbein College
- Profession: Real Estate Agent and Politician

Anne Gonzales (born August 12, 1963) is a Real Estate Advisor for Coldwell Banker Realty. A former member of the Ohio House of Representatives, she represented the Nineteenth District between 2011 and 2019.

== Career ==
Gonzales is a Realtor with Coldwell Banker Realty. After graduating from Otterbein University, Gonzales worked as a paralegal before returning home to raise children. Gonzales has been on Westerville City Council since 2002, and served as Vice Mayor and Mayor for four years.

== Ohio House of Representatives ==
Democrat Marian Harris won an upset in the 19th House District in 2008 after many years in Republican hands. In 2010, the seat was a top target for Republicans, and Gonzales was seen as a viable candidate. In November 2009, she entered the race to unseat Harris. In the general election, Gonzales proved victorious, beating Harris by almost 6,000 votes.

Gonzales was sworn into her first term on January 3, 2011, and is serving as a member of the Economic and Small Business Development Committee; the Health and Aging Committee (Vice-chair); the Public Utilities Committee; and the Rules and Reference Committee. She also is a member of the Joint Council on Developmental Disabilities; and the Joint Committee on Bingo and Skill Based Gaming.

In 2012, Gonzales was reelected to her seat, defeating Democrat Ryan Jolley with 56.64% of the vote.

Along with Gerald Stebelton, Gonzales had introduced legislation that would allow widows of veterans to continue using special license plates honoring the receipt of the Purple Heart, Medal of Honor, Silver Star or Bronze Star. Following a statement by the Department of Defense that was invoked when granting permission to use the designs is the BMV only issue plates to people who received the military awards, Gonzales announced she was no longer proceeding with the bill.

Gonzales, along with Senator Jim Hughes, founded the Legislative Cancer Caucus, which will meet quarterly to raise understanding among their colleagues about one of the nation's leading killers.

She was Chair of the Health and Aging Committee, Vice Chair of Public Utilities, severed on the Finance Committee, Workforce Development Committee.

== Ohio Senate Campaign ==
In 2018, Gonzales ran for State Senator from the 3rd district, filling a position vacated by Republican Kevin Bacon. After initially being the frontrunner, she lost a close race to Democrat Tina Maharath, by a margin of .6%. Gonzales' former house district was also picked up by Democrats.
