= 2016 United States House of Representatives elections in Ohio =

- November 8, 2016

All 16 Ohio seats to the United States House of Representatives
	Majority party	Minority party
Party	Republican	Democratic
Last election	12	4
Seats won	12	4
Seat change	Steady	Steady
Popular vote	2,996,017	2,154,523
Percentage	58.17%	41.83%
Swing	▼1.85%	▲1.85%

Republican
50–60%
60–70%
70–80%
80–90%
Democratic
50–60%
60–70%
80–90%

The 2016 United States House of Representatives elections in Ohio were held on November 8, 2016, to elect the 16 U.S. representatives from the state of Ohio, one from each of the state's 16 congressional districts. The elections coincided with the 2016 U.S. presidential election, as well as other elections to the House of Representatives, elections to the United States Senate and various state and local elections. The primaries were held on March 15.

== Overview ==
The table shows the number and percentage of votes, as well as the number of seats gained and lost, by each political party in the 2016 elections for the United States House of Representatives in Ohio.

=== Statewide ===
Party	Candidates	Votes		Seats		
Party	Candidates	No.	%	No.	+/–	%
Republican	16	2,996,017	57.41	12	Steady	75.00
Democratic	16	2,154,523	41.29	4	Steady	25.00
Independent	2	32,584	0.62	0	Steady	0.00
Green	3	27,524	0.53	0	Steady	0.00
Write-in	6	7,707	0.15	0	Steady	0.00
Total	43	5,218,355	100.0	16	Steady	100.0

Popular vote
Republican	57.41%
Democratic	41.29%
Green	0.53%
Other	0.77%

House seats
Republican	75.00%
Democratic	25.00%

=== District ===
Results of the 2016 United States House of Representatives elections in Ohio by district:

District	Republican		Democratic		Others		Total		Result
District	Votes	%	Votes	%	Votes	%	Votes	%	Result
District 1	210,014	59.19%	144,644	40.77%	0	0.00%	354,788	100.00%	Republican hold
District 2	221,193	65.00%	111,694	32.82%	130	0.04%	340,279	100.00%	Republican hold
District 3	91,560	31.43%	199,791	68.57%	7,392	2.17%	291,351	100.00%	Democratic hold
District 4	210,227	67.99%	98,981	32.01%	0	0.00%	309,208	100.00%	Republican hold
District 5	244,599	70.90%	100,392	29.10%	0	0.00%	344,991	100.00%	Republican hold
District 6	213,975	70.68%	88,780	29.32%	0	0.00%	302,755	100.00%	Republican hold
District 7	198,221	64.03%	89,638	28.96%	21,694	7.01%	309,553	100.00%	Republican hold
District 8	223,833	68.76%	87,794	26.97%	13,879	4.26%	325,506	100.00%	Republican hold
District 9	88,427	31.31%	193,966	68.69%	5	0.00%	282,398	100.00%	Democratic hold
District 10	215,724	64.09%	109,981	32.67%	10,897	3.24%	336,602	100.00%	Republican hold
District 11	59,769	19.75%	242,917	80.25%	0	0.00%	302,686	100.00%	Democratic hold
District 12	251,266	66.55%	112,638	29.84%	13,630	3.61%	377,534	100.00%	Republican hold
District 13	99,377	32.26%	208,610	67.73%	17	0.01%	308,004	100.00%	Democratic hold
District 14	219,191	62.58%	130,907	37.37%	171	0.05%	350,269	100.00%	Republican hold
District 15	222,847	66.16%	113,960	33.84%	0	0.00%	336,807	100.00%	Republican hold
District 16	225,794	65.33%	119,830	34.67%	0	0.00%	345,624	100.00%	Republican hold
Total	2,996,017	57.41%	2,154,523	41.29%	67,815	1.30%	5,218,355	100.00%	

== District 1 ==
2016 Ohio's 1st congressional district election
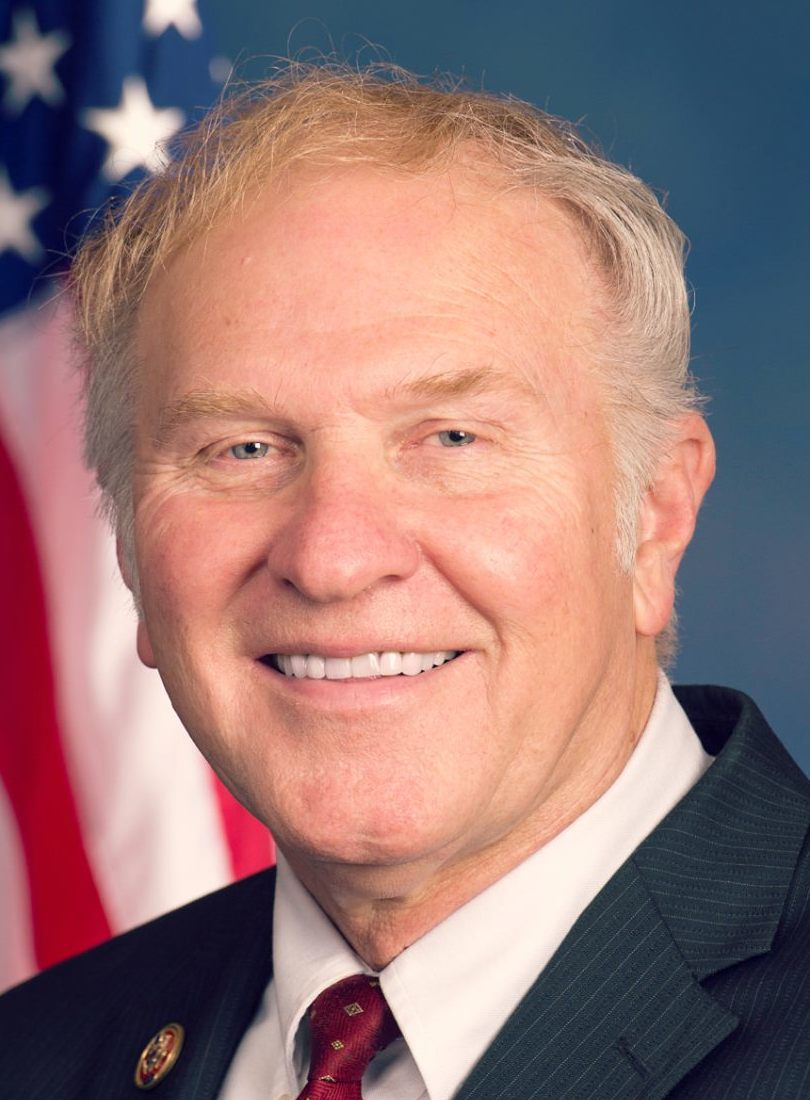

Nominee	Steve Chabot	Michele Young
Party	Republican	Democratic
Popular vote	210,014	144,644
Percentage	59.1%	40.7%
- Chabot: 50–60% 60–70% 70–80% 80–90% Young: 50–60% 60–70% 70–80% 80–90% >90% No votes
U.S. Representative before election
Steve Chabot
Republican
Elected U.S. Representative
Steve Chabot
Republican

The 1st district is based in Cincinnati, stretching southwestward to Ohio's borders with Kentucky and Indiana. It had been held by Republican Steve Chabot since 2011.

=== Republican primary ===
==== Candidates ====
===== Nominee =====
- Steve Chabot, incumbent U.S. Representative

==== Results ====
Republican primary results
Party	Candidate	Votes	%
Republican	Steve Chabot (incumbent)	101,026	100.0
Total votes		101,026	100.0

=== Democratic primary ===
==== Candidates ====
===== Nominee =====
- Michele Young, attorney and author

===== Eliminated in primary =====
- Jim Berns, Libertarian candidate in the 2010 and 2012 congressional elections
- Fred Kundrata, Air Force veteran, Republican candidate for Ohio's 2nd congressional district in 2012 and nominee for this seat in 2014

===== Withdrawn =====
- Samuel Ronan, maintenance technician

==== Results ====
Democratic primary results
Party	Candidate	Votes	%
Democratic	Michele Young	39,535	68.0
Democratic	Fred Kundrata	11,944	20.5
Democratic	Jim Berns	6,693	11.5
Total votes		58,172	100.0

=== General election ===
==== Endorsements ====
Michele Young (D)

U.S Senators

- Sherrod Brown, U.S. Senator (2007–present)

State officials

- Eric Brown, Chief Justice of the Ohio Supreme Court (2010)
- Jennifer Brunner, Secretary of State of Ohio (2007–2011)

Local officials

- John Cranley, Mayor of Cincinnati (2013–present)
- Chris Seelbach, Member of Cincinnati City Council

Individuals

- Greg Landsman, civic leader

==== Predictions ====
Source	Ranking	As of
The Cook Political Report	Safe R	November 7, 2016
Daily Kos Elections	Safe R	November 7, 2016
Rothenberg	Safe R	November 3, 2016
Sabato's Crystal Ball	Safe R	November 7, 2016
RCP	Safe R	October 31, 2016

==== Results ====
Ohio's 1st congressional district, 2016
Party	Candidate	Votes	%
Republican	Steve Chabot (incumbent)	210,014	59.2
Democratic	Michele Young	144,644	40.8
Independent	Sholom D. Keller (write-in)	114	0.0
Independent	Kiumars G. Kiani (Write-in)	16	0.0
Total votes		354,788	100.0
Republican hold			

=== Official campaign websites ===
- Steve Chabot for Congress
- Michele Young for Congress
- Shalom Keller for Congress
- Kiumars Kiani for Congress

== District 2 ==
2016 Ohio's 2nd congressional district election
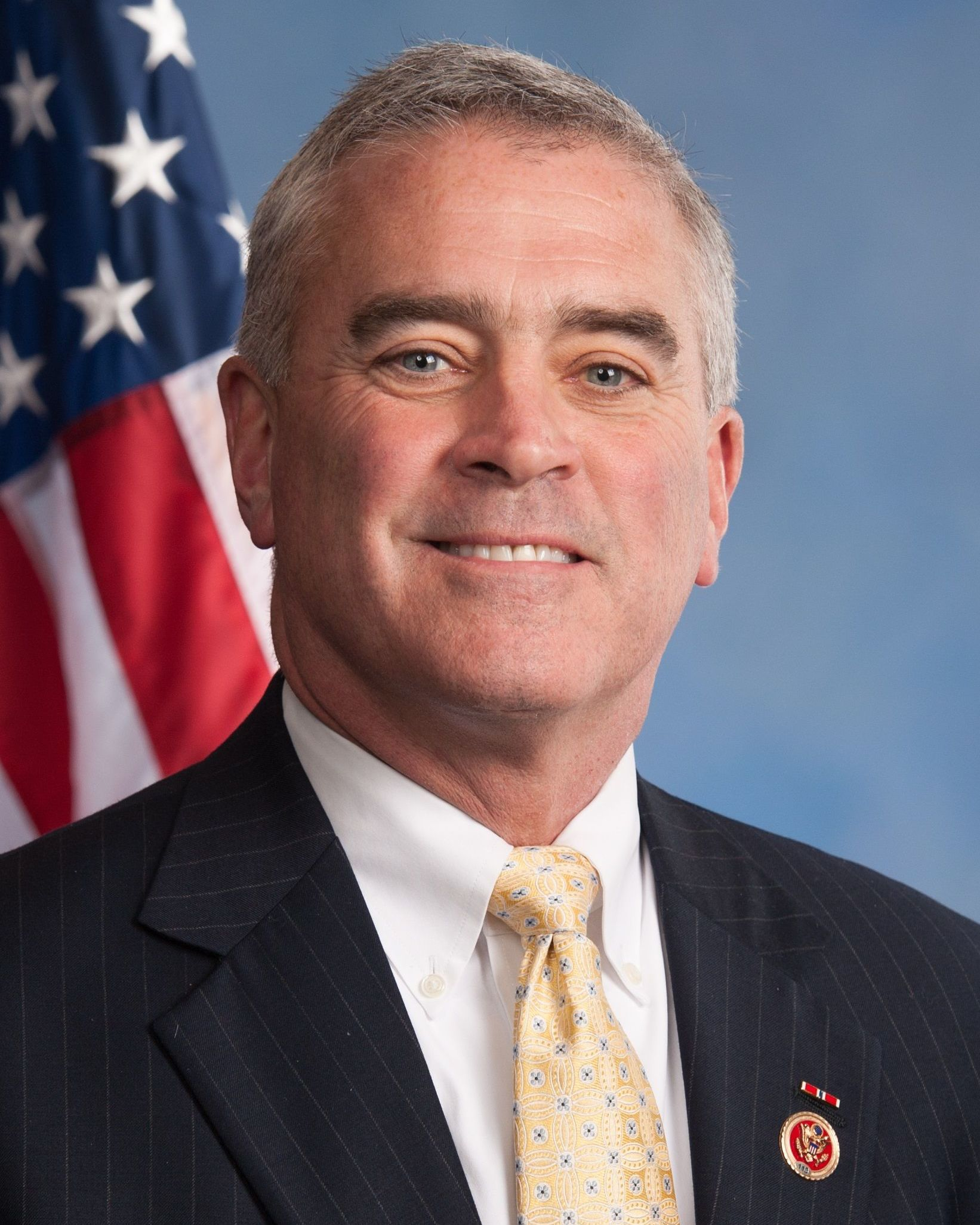

Nominee	Brad Wenstrup	William Smith
Party	Republican	Democratic
Popular vote	221,193	111,694
Percentage	65.0%	32.8%
- Wenstrup: 50–60% 60–70% 70–80% 80–90% >90% Smith: 50–60% 60–70% 70–80% 80–90% >90% No votes
U.S. Representative before election
Brad Wenstrup
Republican
Elected U.S. Representative
Brad Wenstrup
Republican

The 2nd district takes eastern Cincinnati and its suburbs, including Norwood and Loveland, and stretches eastward along the Ohio River. It had been held by Republican Brad Wenstrup since 2013.

=== Republican primary ===
==== Candidates ====
===== Nominee =====
- Brad Wenstrup, incumbent U.S. Representative

===== Eliminated in primary =====
- Jim Lewis, member of the West Clermont Board of Education

==== Results ====
Republican primary results
Party	Candidate	Votes	%
Republican	Brad Wenstrup (incumbent)	101,765	84.9
Republican	Jim Lewis	18,136	15.1
Total votes		119,901	100.0

=== Democratic primary ===
==== Candidates ====
===== Nominee =====
- William R. Smith, truck driver, nominee for this seat in 2012 and candidate in 2014

===== Eliminated in primary =====
- Russ Hurley, small business owner, filmmaker, barber, US Navy veteran and cannabis activist
- Ronny Richards, Vietnam War veteran and candidate for this seat in 2014

==== Results ====
Democratic primary results
Party	Candidate	Votes	%
Democratic	William R. Smith	19,422	41.7
Democratic	Ronny Richards	13,976	30.0
Democratic	Russ Hurley	13,154	28.3
Total votes		46,552	100.0

=== General election ===
==== Predictions ====
Source	Ranking	As of
The Cook Political Report	Safe R	November 7, 2016
Daily Kos Elections	Safe R	November 7, 2016
Rothenberg	Safe R	November 3, 2016
Sabato's Crystal Ball	Safe R	November 7, 2016
RCP	Safe R	October 31, 2016

==== Results ====
Ohio's 2nd congressional district, 2016
Party	Candidate	Votes	%
Republican	Brad Wenstrup (incumbent)	221,193	65.0
Democratic	William R. Smith	111,694	32.8
Independent	Janet Everhard (write-in)	7,392	2.2
Total votes		340,279	100.0
Republican hold			

=== Official campaign websites ===
- Brad Wenstrup for Congress
- Janet Everhard for Congress

== District 3 ==
2016 Ohio's 3rd congressional district election
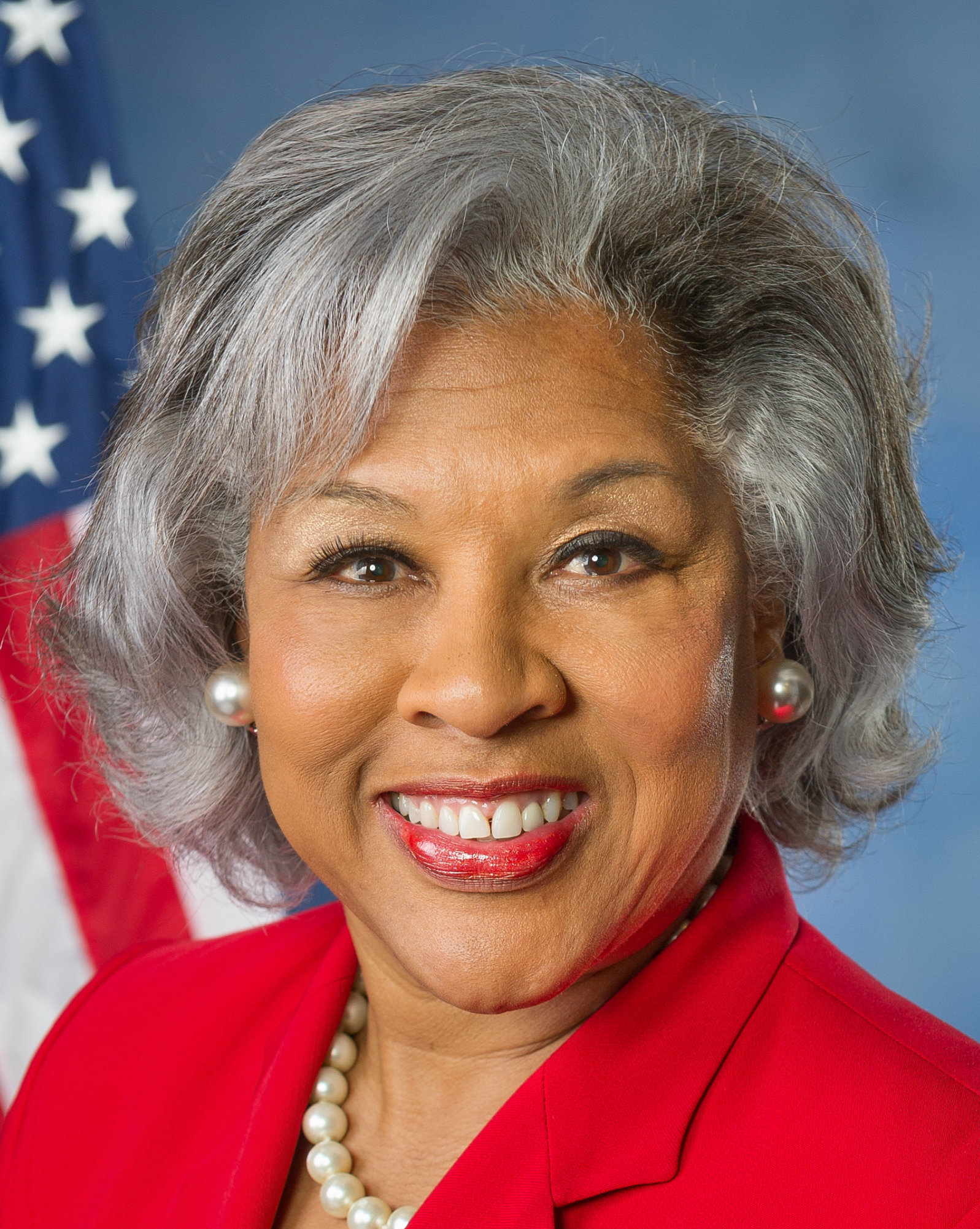

Nominee	Joyce Beatty	John Adams
Party	Democratic	Republican
Popular vote	199,791	91,560
Percentage	68.5%	31.4%
- Precinct results Beatty: 50–60% 60–70% 70–80% 80–90% >90% Adams: 50–60% 60–70% 70–80% 80–90% >90% Tie: 50% No votes
U.S. Representative before election
Joyce Beatty
Democratic
Elected U.S. Representative
Joyce Beatty
Democratic

The 3rd district, located entirely within the borders of Franklin County, taking in inner Columbus, Bexley, Whitehall, as well as Franklin County's share of Reynoldsburg. It had been held by Democrat Joyce Beatty since 2013.

=== Democratic primary ===
==== Candidates ====
===== Nominee =====
- Joyce Beatty, incumbent U.S. Representative

==== Results ====
Democratic primary results
Party	Candidate	Votes	%
Democratic	Joyce Beatty (incumbent)	79,893	100.0
Total votes		79,893	100.0

=== Republican primary ===
==== Candidates ====
===== Nominee =====
- John Adams, manufacturing company owner, candidate for this seat in 2012 and nominee for this seat in 2014

==== Results ====
Republican primary results
Party	Candidate	Votes	%
Republican	John Adams	36,851	100.0
Total votes		36,851	100.0

=== General election ===
==== Predictions ====
Source	Ranking	As of
The Cook Political Report	Safe D	November 7, 2016
Daily Kos Elections	Safe D	November 7, 2016
Rothenberg	Safe D	November 3, 2016
Sabato's Crystal Ball	Safe D	November 7, 2016
RCP	Safe D	October 31, 2016

==== Results ====
Ohio's 3rd congressional district, 2016
Party	Candidate	Votes	%
Democratic	Joyce Beatty (incumbent)	199,791	68.6
Republican	John Adams	91,560	31.4
Total votes		291,351	100.0
Democratic hold			

=== Official campaign websites ===
- John Adams for Congress
- Joyce Beatty for Congress

== District 4 ==
2016 Ohio's 4th congressional district election
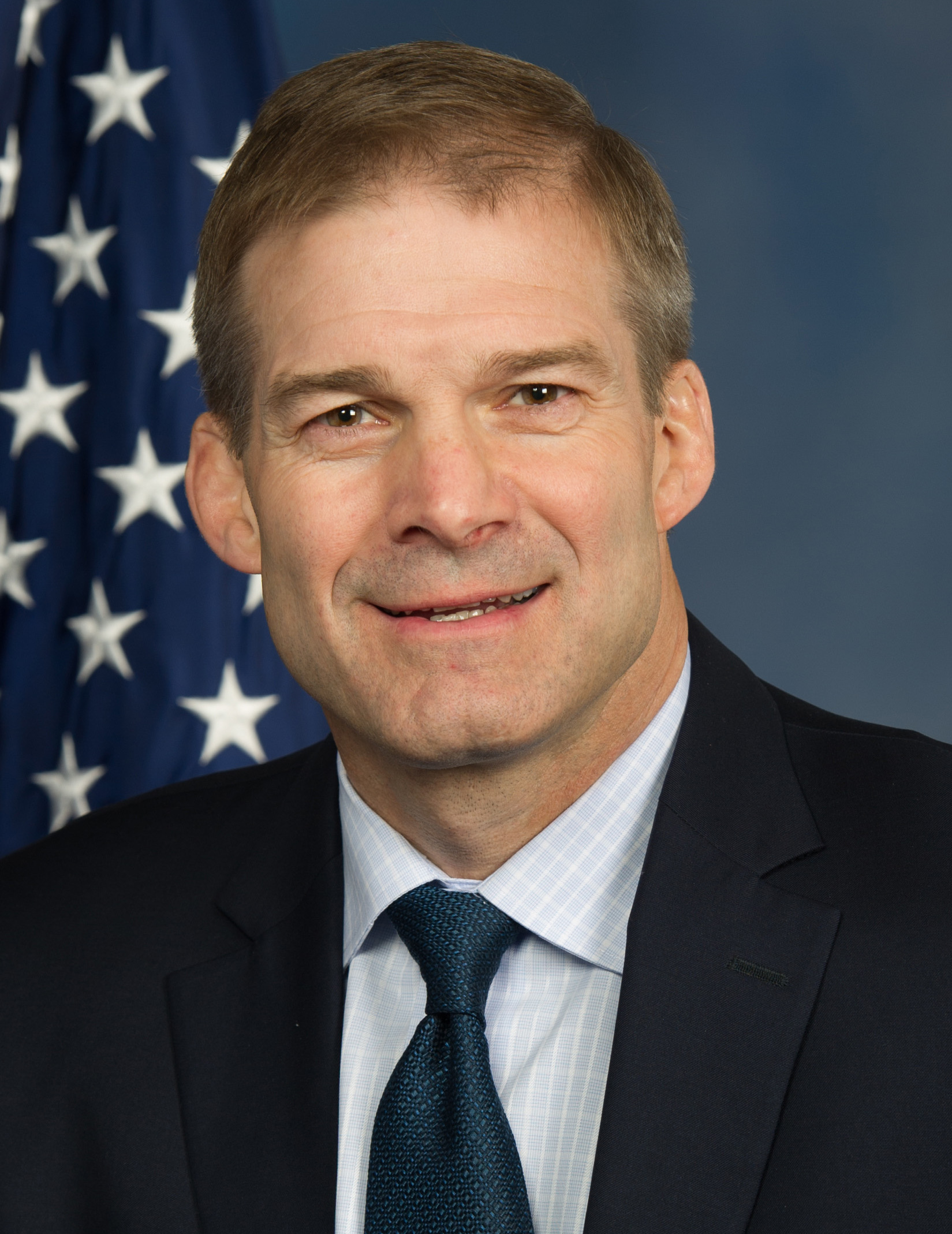

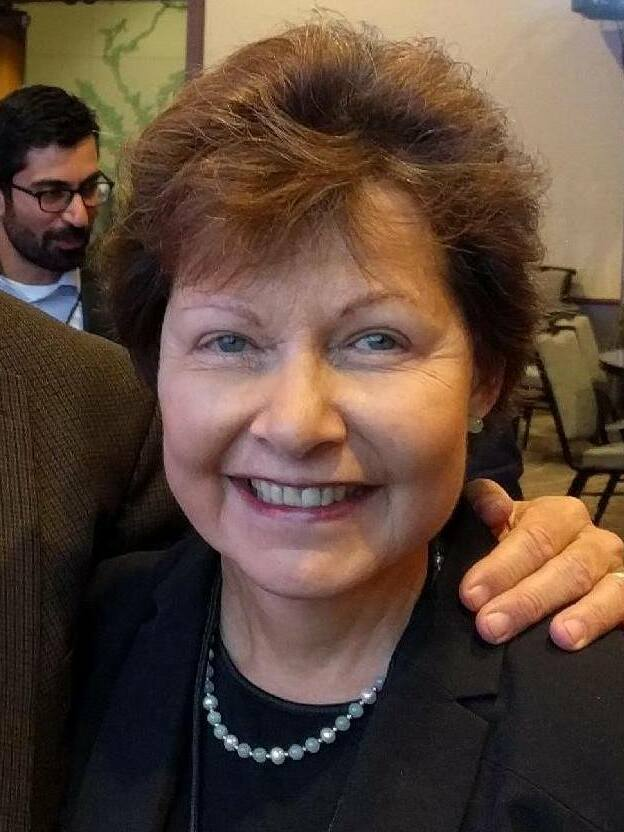
Nominee	Jim Jordan	Janet Garrett
Party	Republican	Democratic
Popular vote	210,227	98,981
Percentage	67.9%	32.0%
- Jordan: 50–60% 60–70% 70–80% 80–90% >90% Garrett: 50–60% 60–70% 70–80% 80–90% >90% No votes
U.S. Representative before election
Jim Jordan
Republican
Elected U.S. Representative
Jim Jordan
Republican

The 4th district, nicknamed the "duck district", sprawls from the Columbus exurbs, including Marion and Lima into north-central Ohio, taking in Oberlin. It has been held by Republican Jim Jordan since 2007.

=== Republican primary ===
==== Candidates ====
===== Nominee =====
- Jim Jordan, incumbent U.S. Representative

==== Results ====
Republican primary results
Party	Candidate	Votes	%
Republican	Jim Jordan (incumbent)	109,743	100.0
Total votes		109,743	100.0

=== Democratic primary ===
==== Candidates ====
===== Nominee =====
- Janet Garrett, retired teacher and nominee for this seat in 2014

===== Eliminated in primary =====
- Norbert G. Dennerll Jr., former Cleveland city councilman and perennial candidate
- Daniel Johnson

==== Results ====
Democratic primary results
Party	Candidate	Votes	%
Democratic	Janet Garrett	29,679	66.7
Democratic	Daniel Johnson	11,314	25.5
Democratic	Norbert G. Dennerll, Jr.	3,480	7.8
Total votes		44,473	100.0

=== General election ===
==== Predictions ====
Source	Ranking	As of
The Cook Political Report	Safe R	November 7, 2016
Daily Kos Elections	Safe R	November 7, 2016
Rothenberg	Safe R	November 3, 2016
Sabato's Crystal Ball	Safe R	November 7, 2016
RCP	Safe R	October 31, 2016

==== Results ====
Ohio's 4th congressional district, 2016
Party	Candidate	Votes	%
Republican	Jim Jordan (incumbent)	210,227	68.0
Democratic	Janet Garrett	98,981	32.0
Total votes		309,208	100.0
Republican hold			

=== Official campaign websites ===
- Janet Garrett for Congress
- Jim Jordan for Congress

== District 5 ==
2016 Ohio's 5th congressional district election
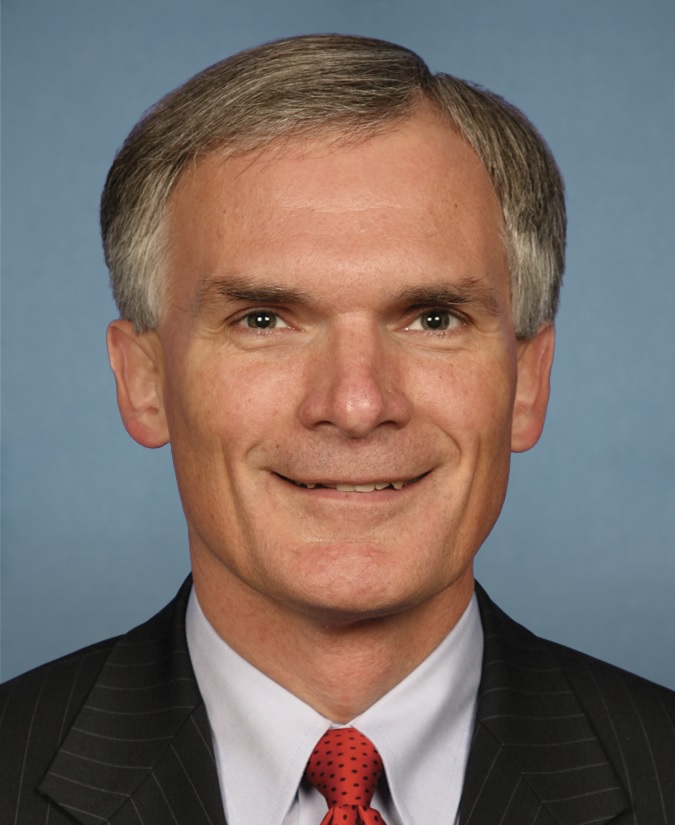

Nominee	Bob Latta	James L. Neu, Jr.
Party	Republican	Democratic
Popular vote	244,599	100,392
Percentage	70.9%	29.1%
- Latta: 50–60% 60–70% 70–80% 80–90% >90% Neu: 50–60% 60–70% 70–80% No votes
U.S. Representative before election
Bob Latta
Republican
Elected U.S. Representative
Bob Latta
Republican

The 5th district encompasses Northwestern Ohio, taking in Findlay, Defiance, and Bowling Green. It had been represented by Republican Bob Latta since 2007.

=== Republican primary ===
==== Candidates ====
===== Nominee =====
- Bob Latta, incumbent U.S. Representative

==== Results ====
Republican primary results
Party	Candidate	Votes	%
Republican	Bob Latta (incumbent)	119,907	100.0
Total votes		119,907	100.0

=== Democratic primary ===
==== Candidates ====
===== Nominee =====
- James L. Neu Jr. employee of Chrysler's Toledo machining plant

==== Results ====
Democratic primary results
Party	Candidate	Votes	%
Democratic	James L. Neu, Jr.	44,005	100.0
Total votes		44,005	100.0

=== General election ===
==== Predictions ====
Source	Ranking	As of
The Cook Political Report	Safe R	November 7, 2016
Daily Kos Elections	Safe R	November 7, 2016
Rothenberg	Safe R	November 3, 2016
Sabato's Crystal Ball	Safe R	November 7, 2016
RCP	Safe R	October 31, 2016

==== Results ====
Ohio's 5th congressional district, 2016
Party	Candidate	Votes	%
Republican	Bob Latta (incumbent)	244,599	70.9
Democratic	James L. Neu, Jr.	100,392	29.1
Total votes		344,991	100.0
Republican hold			

=== Official campaign websites ===
- Bob Latta for Congress
- James Neu for Congress

== District 6 ==
2016 Ohio's 6th congressional district election
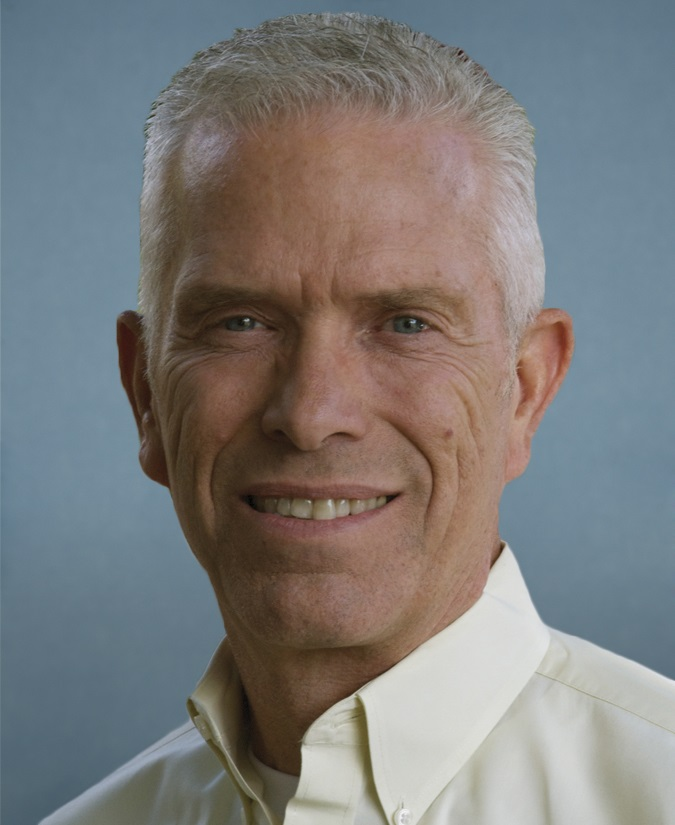

Nominee	Bill Johnson	Michael L. Lorentz
Party	Republican	Democratic
Popular vote	213,975	88,780
Percentage	70.6%	29.3%
- Johnson: 50–60% 60–70% 70–80% 80–90% Lorentz: 50–60% 60–70% No votes
U.S. Representative before election
Bill Johnson
Republican
Elected U.S. Representative
Bill Johnson
Republican

The 6th district encompasses Appalachian Ohio, including Steubenville, Marietta, and Ironton. It had been represented by Bill Johnson since 2011.

=== Republican primary ===
==== Candidates ====
===== Nominee =====
- Bill Johnson, incumbent U.S. Representative

==== Results ====
Republican primary results
Party	Candidate	Votes	%
Republican	Bill Johnson (incumbent)	102,187	100.0
Total votes		102,187	100.0

=== Democratic primary ===
==== Candidates ====
- Michael L. Lorentz, mayor of Belpre

==== Withdrawn ====
- Michael D. Davenport

==== Results ====
Democratic primary results
Party	Candidate	Votes	%
Democratic	Michael L. Lorentz	20,649	100.0
Total votes		20,649	100.0

=== General election ===
==== Predictions ====
Source	Ranking	As of
The Cook Political Report	Safe R	November 7, 2016
Daily Kos Elections	Safe R	November 7, 2016
Rothenberg	Safe R	November 3, 2016
Sabato's Crystal Ball	Safe R	November 7, 2016
RCP	Safe R	October 31, 2016

==== Results ====
Ohio's 6th congressional district, 2016
Party	Candidate	Votes	%
Republican	Bill Johnson (incumbent)	213,975	70.7
Democratic	Michael L. Lorentz	88,780	29.3
Total votes		302,755	100.0
Republican hold			

=== Official campaign websites ===
- Bill Johnson for Congress
- Michael Lorentz for Congress

== District 7 ==
2016 Ohio's 7th congressional district election
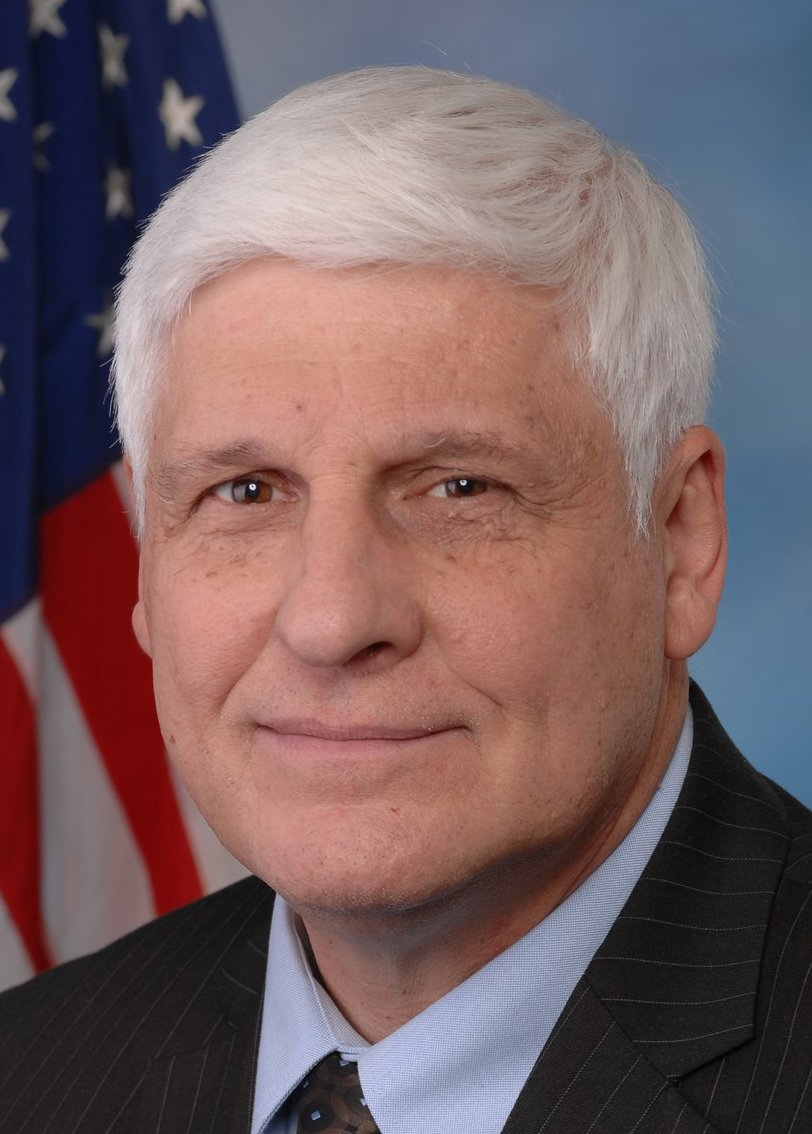

Nominee	Bob Gibbs	Roy Rich	Dan Phillip
Party	Republican	Democratic	Independent
Popular vote	198,221	89,638	21,694
Percentage	64.0%	28.9%	7.0%
- Gibbs: 40–50% 50–60% 60–70% 70–80% 80–90% >90% Rich: 40–50% 50–60% 60–70% 70–80% 80–90% No votes
U.S. Representative before election
Bob Gibbs
Republican
Elected U.S. Representative
Bob Gibbs
Republican

The 7th district is based in northeastern Ohio, and includes the city of Canton. It had been held by Republican Bob Gibbs since 2011.

=== Republican primary ===
==== Candidates ====
===== Nominee =====
- Bob Gibbs, incumbent U.S. Representative

===== Eliminated in primary =====
- Terry Robertson, truck driver and real estate agent

==== Results ====
Republican primary results
Party	Candidate	Votes	%
Republican	Bob Gibbs (incumbent)	80,853	74.6
Republican	Terry Robertson	27,453	25.4
Total votes		108,306	100.00

=== Democratic primary ===
==== Candidates ====
===== Nominee =====
- Roy Rich, retired police commander

===== Withdrawn =====
- Bebley Thomas Spence Jr.

==== Results ====
Democratic primary results
Party	Candidate	Votes	%
Democratic	Roy Rich	43,683	100.0
Total votes		43,683	100.0

=== Independent candidates ===
- Dan Phillip, local business owner

=== General election ===
==== Predictions ====
Source	Ranking	As of
The Cook Political Report	Safe R	November 7, 2016
Daily Kos Elections	Safe R	November 7, 2016
Rothenberg	Safe R	November 3, 2016
Sabato's Crystal Ball	Safe R	November 7, 2016
RCP	Safe R	October 31, 2016

==== Results ====
Ohio's 7th congressional district, 2016
Party	Candidate	Votes	%
Republican	Bob Gibbs (incumbent)	198,221	64.0
Democratic	Roy Rich	89,638	29.0
Independent	Dan Phillip	21,694	7.0
Total votes		309,553	100.0
Republican hold			

=== Official campaign websites ===
- Bob Gibbs for Congress
- Roy Rich for Congress
- Dan Phillip for Congress

== District 8 ==
2016 Ohio's 8th congressional district election
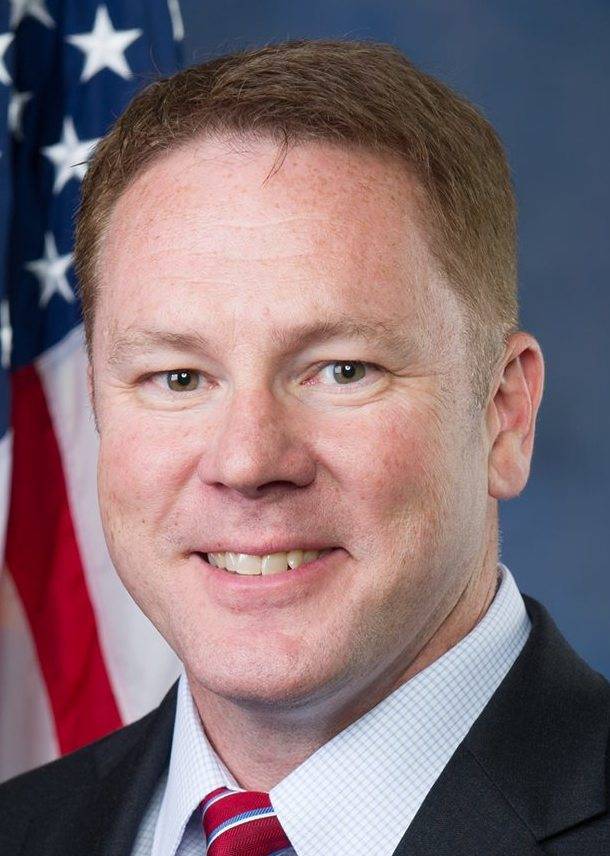

Nominee	Warren Davidson	Steven Fought
Party	Republican	Democratic
Popular vote	223,833	87,794
Percentage	68.7%	26.9%
- Davidson: 40–50% 50–60% 60–70% 70–80% 80–90% >90% Fought: 40–50% 50–60% 60–70% 70–80% 80–90% No votes
U.S. Representative before election
Warren Davidson
Republican
Elected U.S. Representative
Warren Davidson
Republican

The 8th district takes in the northern suburbs of Cincinnati, including Butler County, as well as taking in Springfield. It was held by Republican John Boehner until he announced that he would resign his seat effective October 30, 2015. A special election to fill the remainder of the term was held on June 7.

Prior to the announcement of Boehner's resignation, he was facing primary challenges from Tea Party activists and 2014 opponents businessman Matthew Ashworth and teacher J.D. Winteregg. Since Boehner's announcement, nearly 15 candidates pulled petitions for the Republican nomination.

Corey Foister won the Democratic nomination, but later withdrew from the election after the June 7th special election. Steven Fought was nominated by the Democratic Party to take Foister's place on the general election ballot.

=== Republican primary ===
==== Candidates ====
===== Nominee =====
- Warren Davidson, incumbent U.S. Representative

===== Eliminated in primary =====
- Matthew Ashworth
- Bill Beagle, state senator
- Tim Derickson, state representative
- Scott George, human resources executive
- Eric J. Haemmerle, high school government teacher
- Terri King, attorney
- Joseph Matvey
- Edward R. Meer
- John W. Robbins
- Michael Smith
- Jim Spurlino, businessman
- Kevin F. White, airline pilot and retired USAF officer
- J. D. Winteregg, former adjunct French instructor and candidate in 2014
- George Wooley

==== Withdrawn ====
- Eric Gurr, businessman and candidate in 2014
- Roger Reynolds, Butler County Auditor

==== Declined ====
- Bill Coley, state senator
- Joe Deters, Hamilton County Prosecutor and former Ohio State Treasurer
- Keith Faber, President of the Ohio Senate
- Richard K. Jones, Butler County Sheriff
- Wes Retherford, state representative
- Lee Wong, West Chester Township Trustee

==== Results ====
Republican primary results
Party	Candidate	Votes	%
Republican	Warren Davidson	42,701	32.2
Republican	Timothy S. Derickson	31,685	23.9
Republican	Bill Beagle	26,049	19.6
Republican	Jim Spurlino	9,602	7.2
Republican	J.D. Winteregg	5,375	4.0
Republican	Scott George	3,094	2.3
Republican	Terri King	2,970	2.2
Republican	Kevin F. White	2,384	1.8
Republican	Michael Smith	2,009	1.5
Republican	Matthew Ashworth	1,637	1.2
Republican	John W. Robbins	1,579	1.2
Republican	Eric J. Haemmerle	1,386	1.0
Republican	George S. Wooley	1,045	0.8
Republican	Edward R. Meer	633	0.5
Republican	Joseph Matvey	548	0.4
Total votes		132,697	100.0

=== Democratic primary ===
==== Candidates ====
===== Nominee =====
- Corey Foister

==== Results ====
Democratic primary results
Party	Candidate	Votes	%
Democratic	Corey Foister	32,214	100.0
Total votes		32,214	100.0

==== Replacement Nominee ====
- Steven Fought (D), former communications director and legislative director for U.S. Representative Marcy Kaptur

=== Green primary ===
==== Candidates ====
- James J. Condit Jr.

==== Results ====
Green primary results
Party	Candidate	Votes	%
Green	James J. Condit Jr.	216	100.0
Total votes		216	100.0

==== Replacement Nominee ====
- Derrick James Hendricks (G)

=== General election ===
==== Predictions ====
Source	Ranking	As of
The Cook Political Report	Safe R	November 7, 2016
Daily Kos Elections	Safe R	November 7, 2016
Rothenberg	Safe R	November 3, 2016
Sabato's Crystal Ball	Safe R	November 7, 2016
RCP	Safe R	October 31, 2016

==== Results ====
Ohio's 8th congressional district, 2016
Party	Candidate	Votes	%
Republican	Warren Davidson (incumbent)	223,833	68.7
Democratic	Steven Fought	87,794	27.0
Green	Derrick James Hendricks	13,879	4.3
Total votes		325,506	100.0
Republican hold			

=== Official campaign websites ===
- Warren Davidson for Congress
- Steven Fought for Congress

== District 9 ==
2016 Ohio's 9th congressional district election
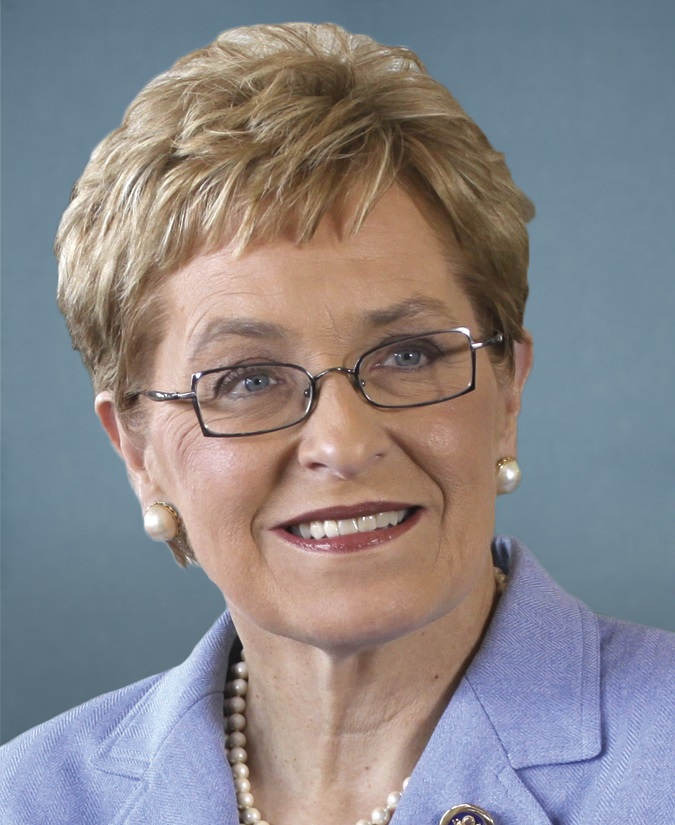

Nominee	Marcy Kaptur	Donald P. Larson
Party	Democratic	Republican
Popular vote	193,966	88,427
Percentage	68.6%	31.3%
- Kaptur: 50–60% 60–70% 70–80% 80–90% >90% Larson: 50–60% 60–70% Tie: 50% No votes
U.S. Representative before election
Marcy Kaptur
Democratic
Elected U.S. Representative
Marcy Kaptur
Democratic

The 9th district spans the coast of Lake Erie from Toledo to the west side of Cleveland, taking in Port Clinton, Sandusky, Lorain, Lakewood, Brook Park, and Brooklyn. It had been held by Democrat Marcy Kaptur since 1983.

=== Democratic primary ===
==== Candidates ====
===== Nominee =====
- Marcy Kaptur, incumbent U.S. Representative

==== Results ====
Democratic primary results
Party	Candidate	Votes	%
Democratic	Marcy Kaptur (incumbent)	80,065	100.0
Total votes		80,065	100.0

=== Republican primary ===
==== Candidates ====
===== Nominee =====
- Donald P. Larson, small business owner

===== Eliminated in primary =====
- Steve Kraus, former State Representative
- Joel Lieske, political science professor at Cleveland State University

==== Results ====
Republican primary results
Party	Candidate	Votes	%
Republican	Donald P. Larson	20,859	44.3
Republican	Steve Kraus	16,966	36.0
Republican	Joel Lieske	9,262	19.7
Total votes		47,087	100.0

=== General election ===
==== Predictions ====
Source	Ranking	As of
The Cook Political Report	Safe D	November 7, 2016
Daily Kos Elections	Safe D	November 7, 2016
Rothenberg	Safe D	November 3, 2016
Sabato's Crystal Ball	Safe D	November 7, 2016
RCP	Safe D	October 31, 2016

==== Results ====
Ohio's 9th congressional district, 2016
Party	Candidate	Votes	%
Democratic	Marcy Kaptur (incumbent)	193,966	68.7
Republican	Donald P. Larson	88,427	31.3
Independent	George Skalsky (Write-in)	5	0.0
Total votes		282,398	100.0
Democratic hold			

=== Official campaign websites ===
- Marcy Kaptur for Congress
- Donald Larson for Congress
- George Skalsky for Congress

== District 10 ==
2016 Ohio's 10th congressional district election
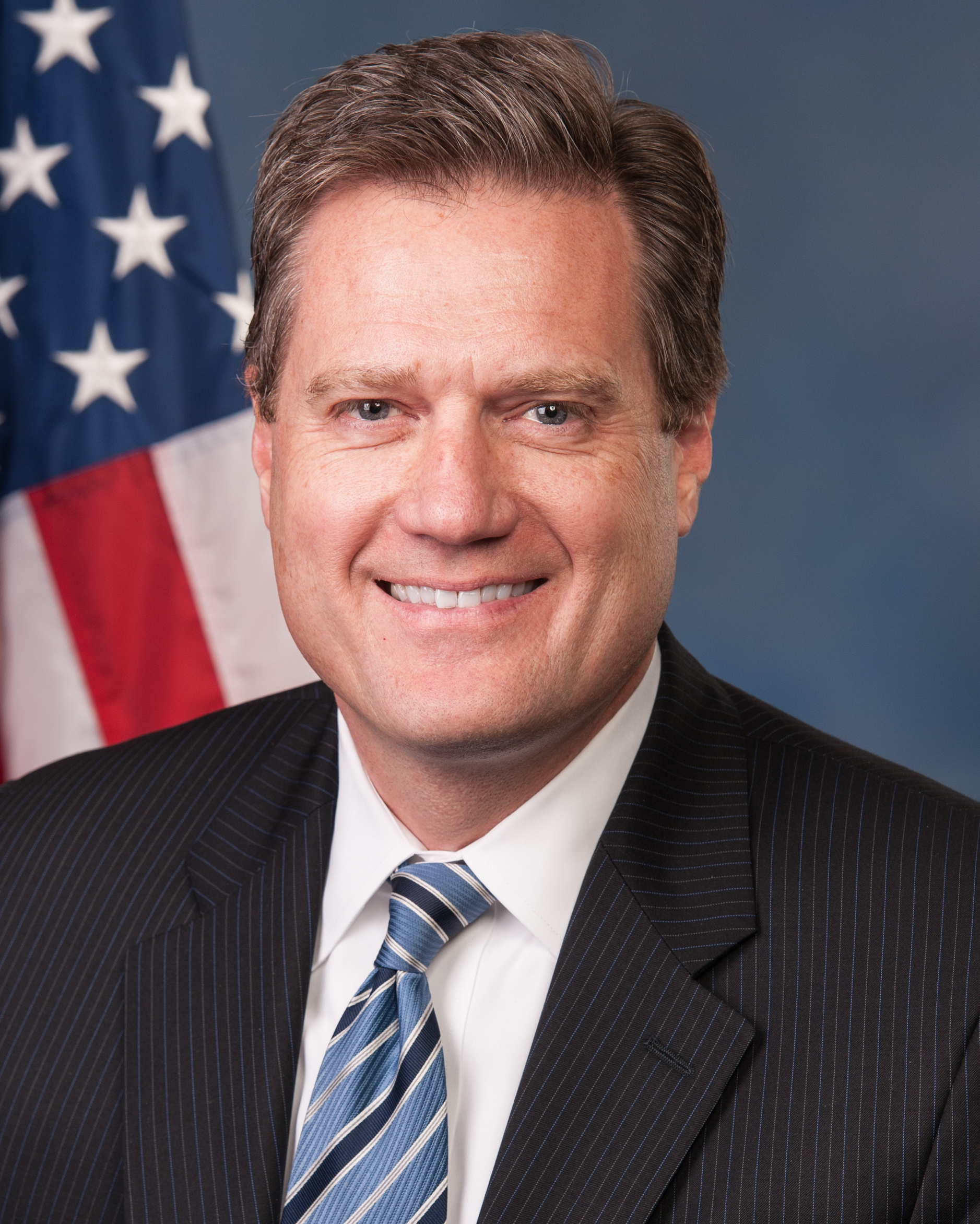

Nominee	Mike Turner	Robert Klepinger
Party	Republican	Democratic
Popular vote	215,724	109,981
Percentage	64.1%	32.6%
- Turner: 40–50% 50–60% 60–70% 70–80% 80–90% >90% Klepinger: 40–50% 50–60% 60–70% 70–80% 80–90% No votes
U.S. Representative before election
Mike Turner
Republican
Elected U.S. Representative
Mike Turner
Republican

The 10th district encompasses the Dayton metro area, including Dayton and the surrounding suburbs. It had been held by Republican Mike Turner since 2003.

=== Republican primary ===
==== Candidates ====
===== Nominee =====
- Mike Turner, incumbent U.S. Representative

==== Results ====
Republican primary results
Party	Candidate	Votes	%
Republican	Mike Turner (incumbent)	108,235	100.0
Total votes		108,235	100.0

=== Democratic primary ===
==== Candidates ====
===== Nominee =====
- Robert Klepinger, nominee for this seat in 2014

==== Results ====
Democratic primary results
Party	Candidate	Votes	%
Democratic	Robert Klepinger	51,854	100.0
Total votes		51,854	100.0

=== Independent candidates ===
- Dave Harlow (write-in)
- Tom McMasters, mayor of Huber Heights, Ohio

=== General election ===
==== Predictions ====
Source	Ranking	As of
The Cook Political Report	Safe R	November 7, 2016
Daily Kos Elections	Safe R	November 7, 2016
Rothenberg	Safe R	November 3, 2016
Sabato's Crystal Ball	Safe R	November 7, 2016
RCP	Safe R	October 31, 2016

==== Results ====
Ohio's 10th congressional district, 2016
Party	Candidate	Votes	%
Republican	Mike Turner (incumbent)	215,724	64.1
Democratic	Robert Klepinger	109,981	32.7
Independent	Tom McMasters	10,890	3.2
Independent	David A. Harlow (write-in)	7	0.0
Total votes		336,602	100.0
Republican hold			

=== Official campaign websites ===
- Robert Klepinger for Congress
- Mike Turner for Congress
- Tom McMasters for Congress
- Dave Harlow for Congress

== District 11 ==
2018 Ohio's 11th congressional district election
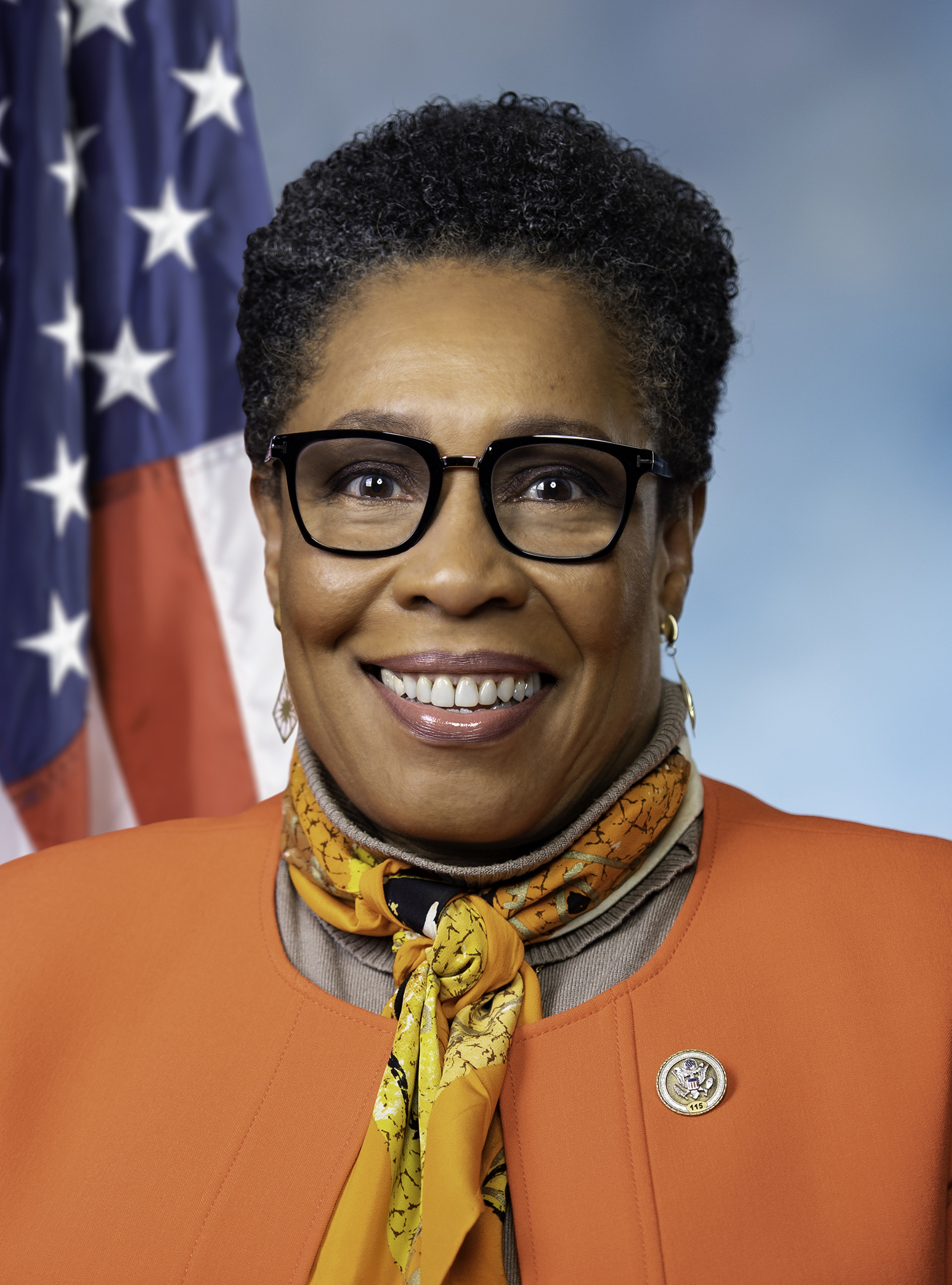

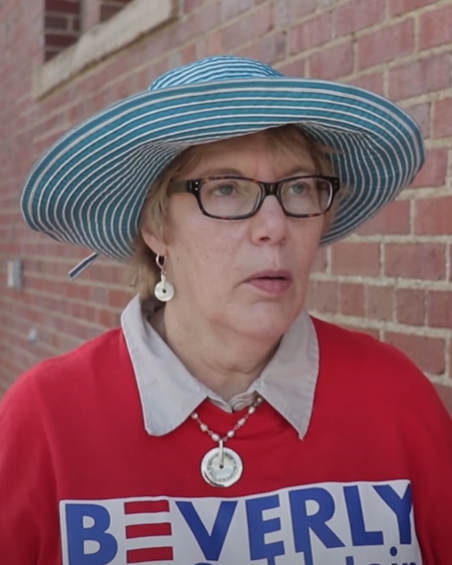
Nominee	Marcia Fudge	Beverly A. Goldstein
Party	Democratic	Republican
Popular vote	242,917	59,769
Percentage	80.2%	19.7%
- Fudge: 50–60% 60–70% 70–80% 80–90% >90% Goldstein: 50–60% 60–70% No votes
U.S. Representative before election
Marcia Fudge
Democratic
Elected U.S. Representative
Marcia Fudge
Democratic

The 11th district takes in eastern Cleveland and its suburbs, including Euclid, Cleveland Heights, and Warrensville Heights, as well as stretching southward into Richfield and parts of Akron. It had been held by Democrat Marcia Fudge since 2008.

=== Democratic primary ===
==== Candidates ====
===== Nominee =====
- Marcia Fudge, incumbent U.S. Representative

==== Results ====
Democratic primary results
Party	Candidate	Votes	%
Democratic	Marcia Fudge (incumbent)	109,706	100.0
Total votes		109,706	100.0

=== Republican primary ===
==== Candidates ====
===== Nominee =====
- Beverly Goldstein, retired audiologist

==== Results ====
Republican primary results
Party	Candidate	Votes	%
Republican	Beverly Goldstein	23,290	100.0
Total votes		23,290	100.0

=== General election ===
==== Predictions ====
Source	Ranking	As of
The Cook Political Report	Safe D	November 7, 2016
Daily Kos Elections	Safe D	November 7, 2016
Rothenberg	Safe D	November 3, 2016
Sabato's Crystal Ball	Safe D	November 7, 2016
RCP	Safe D	October 31, 2016

==== Results ====
Ohio's 11th congressional district, 2016
Party	Candidate	Votes	%
Democratic	Marcia Fudge (incumbent)	242,917	80.3
Republican	Beverly Goldstein	59,769	19.7
Total votes		302,686	100.0
Democratic hold			

=== Official campaign websites ===
- Marcia Fudge for Congress
- Beverly Goldstein for Congress

== District 12 ==
2016 Ohio's 12th congressional district election
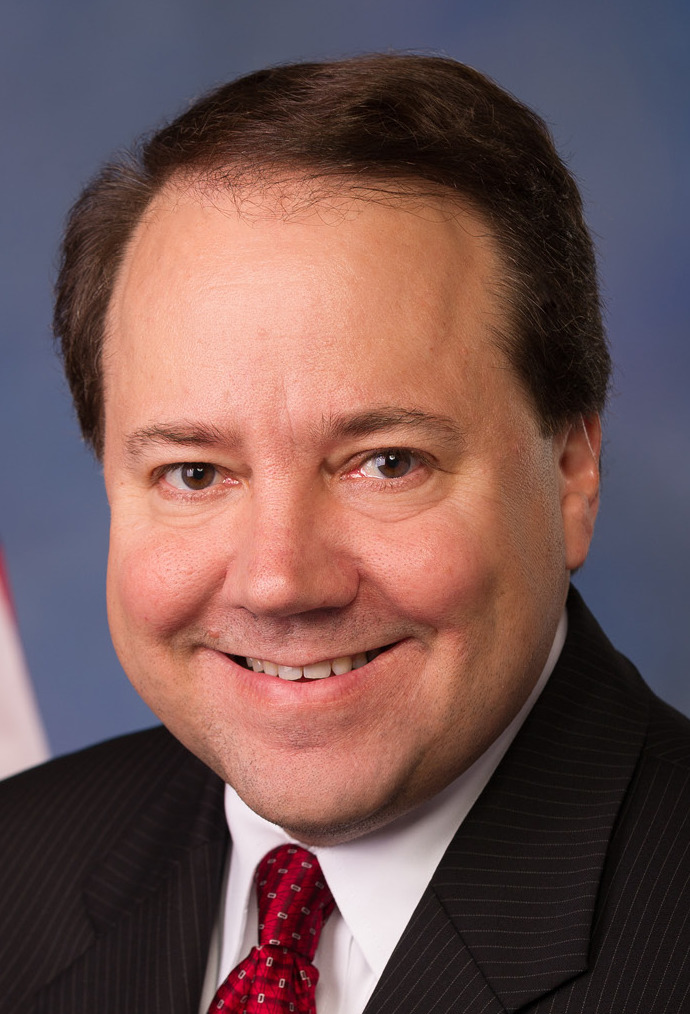

Nominee	Pat Tiberi	Ed Albertson
Party	Republican	Democratic
Popular vote	251,266	112,638
Percentage	66.5%	29.8%
- Tiberi: 40–50% 50–60% 60–70% 70–80% 80–90% >90% Albertson: 40–50% 50–60% 60–70% 70–80% No votes
U.S. Representative before election
Pat Tiberi
Republican
Elected U.S. Representative
Pat Tiberi
Republican

he 12th district encompasses the northern Columbus metro area, taking in the northern Columbus suburbs, including Dublin, Westerville, Gahanna, and New Albany, as well as Newark, Mansfield, and Zanesville. It had been held by Republican Pat Tiberi since 2001.

=== Republican primary ===
==== Candidates ====
===== Nominee =====
- Pat Tiberi, incumbent U.S. Representative

==== Results ====
Republican primary results
Party	Candidate	Votes	%
Republican	Pat Tiberi (incumbent)	128,173	100.0
Total votes		128,173	100.0

=== Democratic primary ===
==== Candidates ====
===== Nominee =====
- Ed Albertson, businessman

==== Results ====
Democratic primary results
Party	Candidate	Votes	%
Democratic	Ed Albertson	48,537	100.0
Total votes		48,537	100.0

=== Green primary ===
==== Candidates ====
===== Nominee =====
- Joe Manchik

==== Results ====
Green primary results
Party	Candidate	Votes	%
Green	Joe Manchik	239	100.0
Total votes		239	100.0

=== General election ===
==== Predictions ====
Source	Ranking	As of
The Cook Political Report	Safe R	November 7, 2016
Daily Kos Elections	Safe R	November 7, 2016
Rothenberg	Safe R	November 3, 2016
Sabato's Crystal Ball	Safe R	November 7, 2016
RCP	Safe R	October 31, 2016

==== Results ====
Ohio's 12th congressional district, 2016
Party	Candidate	Votes	%
Republican	Pat Tiberi (incumbent)	251,266	66.6
Democratic	Ed Albertson	112,638	29.8
Green	Joe Manchik	13,474	3.6
Independent	John J. Baumeister (write-in)	156	0.0
Total votes		377,534	100.0
Republican hold			

=== Official campaign websites ===
- Ed Albertson for Congress
- Joe Manchik for Congress
- Pat Tiberi for Congress
- J. Baumeister for Congress

== District 13 ==
2016 Ohio's 13th congressional district election
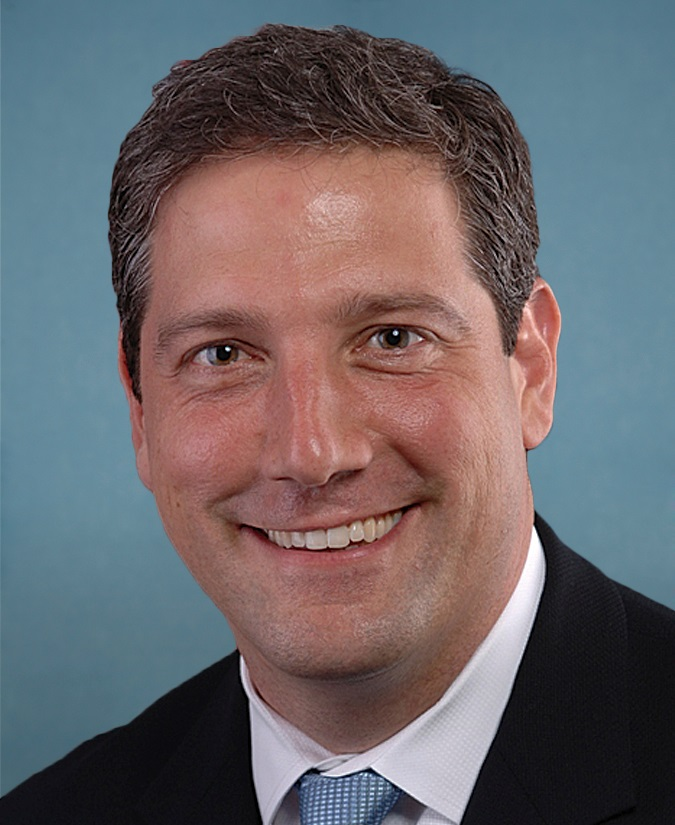

Nominee	Tim Ryan	Richard A. Morckel
Party	Democratic	Republican
Popular vote	208,610	99,377
Percentage	67.7%	32.2%
- Ryan: 50–60% 60–70% 70–80% 80–90% >90% Morckel: 50–60% 60–70%
U.S. Representative before election
Tim Ryan
Democratic
Elected U.S. Representative
Tim Ryan
Democratic

The 13th district covers the Mahoning Valley in northeastern Ohio, including Youngstown and eastern parts of Akron. It had been held by Democrat Tim Ryan since 2003.

=== Democratic primary ===
==== Candidates ====
===== Nominee =====
- Tim Ryan, incumbent U.S. Representative

===== Eliminated in primary =====
- John Stephen Luchansky, perennial candidate

==== Results ====
Democratic primary results
Party	Candidate	Votes	%
Democratic	Tim Ryan (incumbent)	88,154	89.3
Democratic	John Stephen Luchansky	10,578	10.7
Total votes		98,732	100.0

=== Republican primary ===
==== Candidates ====
===== Nominee =====
- Richard Morckel, technician

==== Results ====
Republican primary results
Party	Candidate	Votes	%
Republican	Richard Morckel	50,750	100.0
Total votes		50,750	100.0

=== General election ===
==== Predictions ====
Source	Ranking	As of
The Cook Political Report	Safe D	November 7, 2016
Daily Kos Elections	Safe D	November 7, 2016
Rothenberg	Safe D	November 3, 2016
Sabato's Crystal Ball	Safe D	November 7, 2016
RCP	Safe D	October 31, 2016

==== Results ====
Ohio's 13th congressional district, 2016
Party	Candidate	Votes	%
Democratic	Tim Ryan (incumbent)	208,610	67.7
Republican	Richard A. Morckel	99,377	32.3
Independent	Calvin Hill, Sr. (write-in)	17	0.0
Total votes		308,004	100.0
Democratic hold			

=== Official campaign websites ===
- Tim Ryan for Congress
- Richard Morckel for Congress

== District 14 ==
2016 Ohio's 14th congressional district election
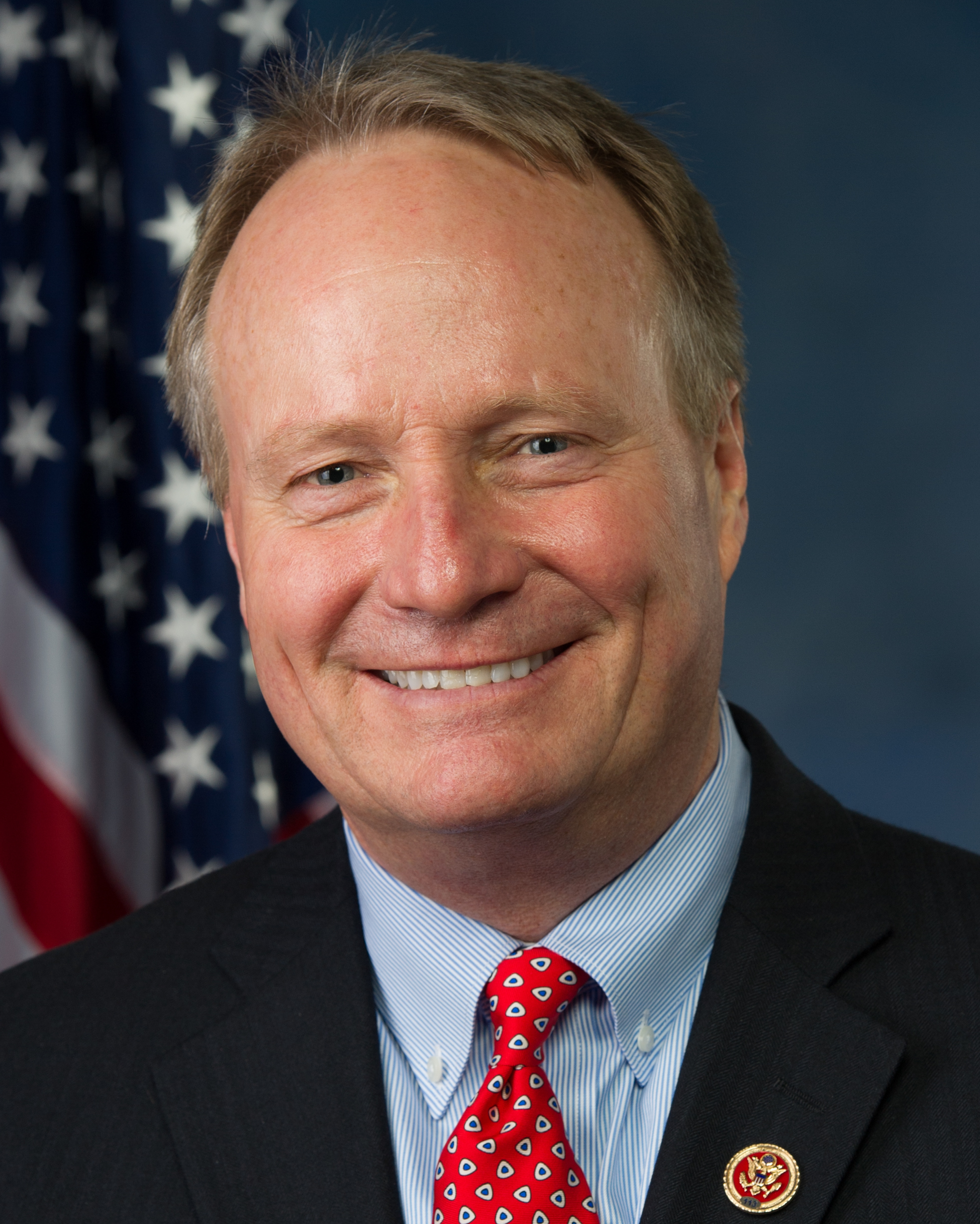

Nominee	David Joyce	Michael Wager
Party	Republican	Democratic
Popular vote	219,191	130,907
Percentage	62.5%	37.3%
- Joyce: 50–60% 60–70% 70–80% 80–90% Wager: 50–60% 60–70% 70–80% 80–90% Tie: 50% No votes
U.S. Representative before election
David Joyce
Republican
Elected U.S. Representative
David Joyce
Republican

The 14th district is located in Northeast Ohio, taking in the eastern suburbs and exurbs of Cleveland, including Mayfield Heights, Solon, and Independence, as well as Ashtabula, Lake, and Geauga counties, northern Portage County, and northeastern Summit County. It had been held by Republican David Joyce since 2013.

=== Republican primary ===
==== Candidates ====
===== Nominee =====
- David Joyce, incumbent U.S. Representative

===== Eliminated in primary =====
- Matt Lynch, former State Representative and candidate for this seat in 2014

==== Results ====
Republican primary results
Party	Candidate	Votes	%
Republican	David Joyce (incumbent)	79,919	64.5
Republican	Matt Lynch	44,004	35.5
Total votes		123,923	100.0

=== Democratic primary ===
==== Candidates ====
===== Nominee =====
- Michael Wager, attorney and nominee for this seat in 2014

===== Eliminated in primary =====
- Alfred Mackey, former Ashtabula County Common Pleas Judge

==== Results ====
Democratic primary results
Party	Candidate	Votes	%
Democratic	Michael Wager	36,796	66.6
Democratic	Alfred Mackey	18,442	33.4
Total votes		55,238	100.0

=== General election ===
==== Predictions ====
Source	Ranking	As of
The Cook Political Report	Safe R	November 7, 2016
Daily Kos Elections	Safe R	November 7, 2016
Rothenberg	Safe R	November 3, 2016
Sabato's Crystal Ball	Safe R	November 7, 2016
RCP	Safe R	October 31, 2016

==== Results ====
Ohio's 14th congressional district, 2016
Party	Candidate	Votes	%
Republican	David Joyce (incumbent)	219,191	62.6
Democratic	Michael Wager	130,907	37.4
Green	Andrew Jarvi (write-in)	171	0.0
Total votes		350,269	100.0
Republican hold			

=== Official campaign websites ===
- David Joyce for Congress
- Michael Wager for Congress
- Andrew Jarvi for Congress

== District 15 ==
2016 Ohio's 15th congressional district election
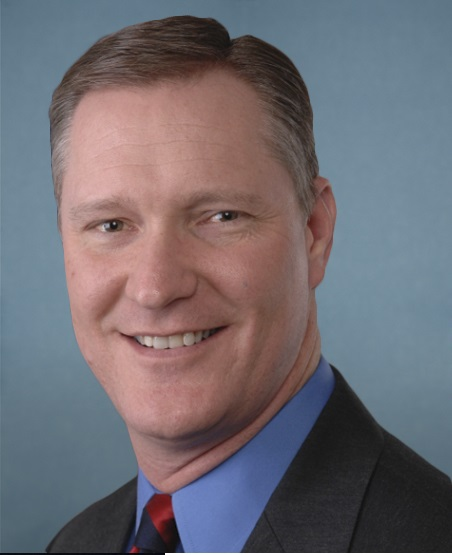

Nominee	Steve Stivers	Scott Wharton
Party	Republican	Democratic
Popular vote	222,847	113,960
Percentage	66.1%	33.8%
- Stivers: 50–60% 60–70% 70–80% 80–90% >90% Wharton: 50–60% 60–70% 70–80% 80–90% >90% No votes
U.S. Representative before election
Steve Stivers
Republican
Elected U.S. Representative
Steve Stivers
Republican

The 15th district encompasses the southern Columbus metro area, taking in the western and eastern suburbs of Columbus, including Upper Arlington, Hilliard, and Grove City, as well as Athens. It had been held by Republican Steve Stivers since 2011.

=== Republican primary ===
==== Candidates ====
===== Nominee =====
- Steve Stivers, incumbent U.S. Representative

==== Results ====
Republican primary results
Party	Candidate	Votes	%
Republican	Steve Stivers (incumbent)	106,410	100.0
Total votes		106,410	100.0

=== Democratic primary ===
==== Candidates ====
===== Nominee =====
- Scott Wharton, farmer, airline pilot, candidate for this seat in 2012 and nominee for this seat in 2014

==== Results ====
Democratic primary results
Party	Candidate	Votes	%
Democratic	Scott Wharton	48,477	100.0
Total votes		48,477	100.0

=== Green primary ===
==== Candidates ====
- Dennis Lambert, nominee for the 6th District in 2014

==== Results ====
Green primary results
Party	Candidate	Votes	%
Green	Dennis Lambert (write-in)	5	100.0
Total votes		5	100.0

=== General election ===
==== Predictions ====
Source	Ranking	As of
The Cook Political Report	Safe R	November 7, 2016
Daily Kos Elections	Safe R	November 7, 2016
Rothenberg	Safe R	November 3, 2016
Sabato's Crystal Ball	Safe R	November 7, 2016
RCP	Safe R	October 31, 2016

==== Results ====
Ohio's 15th congressional district, 2016
Party	Candidate	Votes	%
Republican	Steve Stivers (incumbent)	222,847	66.2
Democratic	Scott Wharton	113,960	33.8
Total votes		336,807	100.0
Republican hold			

=== Official campaign websites ===
- Steve Stivers for Congress
- Scott Wharton for Congress

== District 16 ==
2016 Ohio's 16th congressional district election
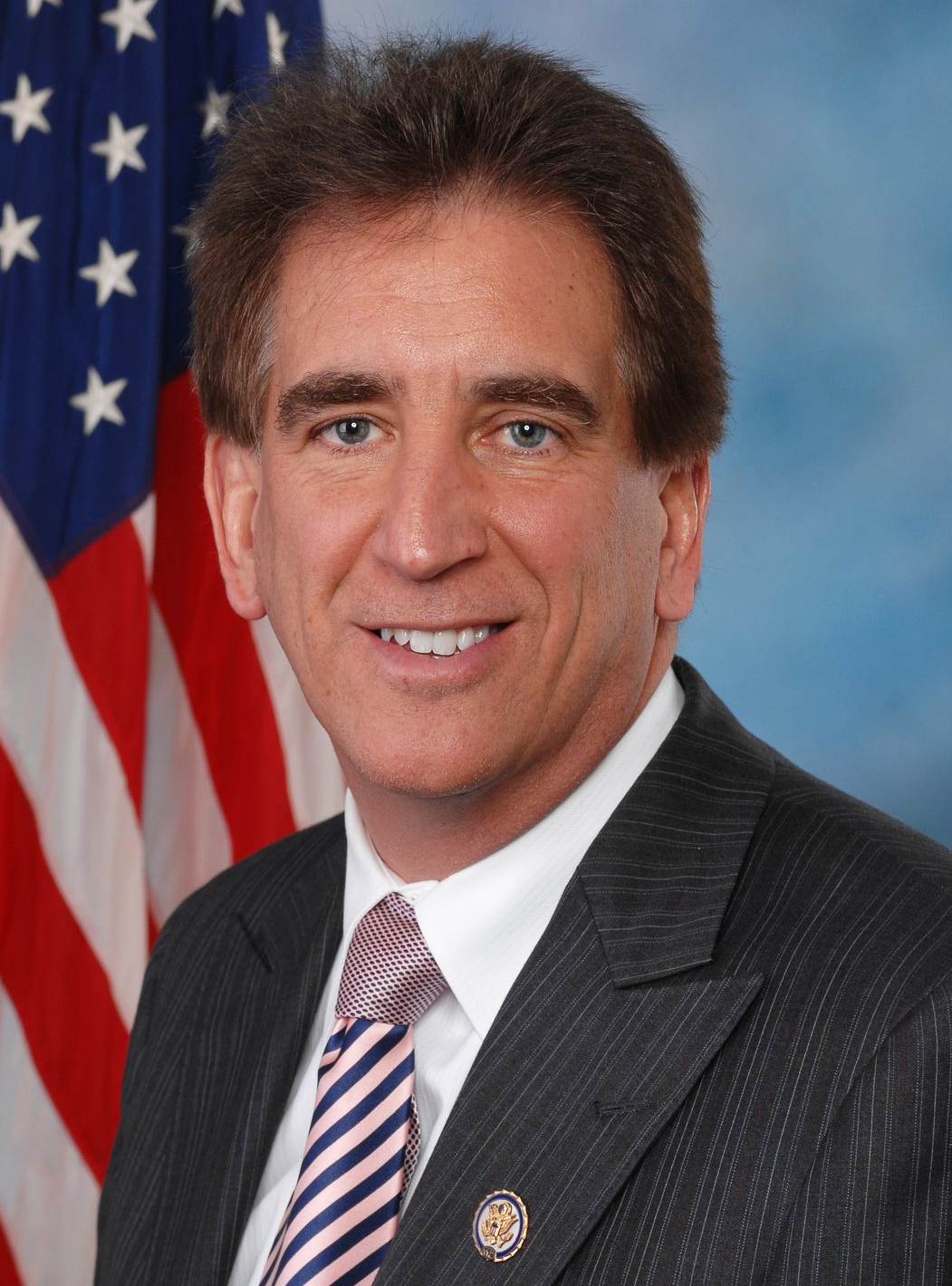

Nominee	Jim Renacci	Keith Mundy
Party	Republican	Democratic
Popular vote	225,794	119,830
Percentage	65.3%	34.6%
- Renacci: 50–60% 60–70% 70–80% 80–90% >90% Mundy: 50–60% 60–70% 70–80% Tie: 50% No votes
U.S. Representative before election
Jim Renacci
Republican
Elected U.S. Representative
Jim Renacci
Republican

The 16th district takes in the western suburbs of Cleveland, including Westlake, Parma, and Strongsville, as well as Medina, Norton, and North Canton. It had been held by Republican Jim Renacci since 2011.

=== Republican primary ===
==== Candidates ====
===== Nominee =====
- Jim Renacci, incumbent U.S. Representative

==== Results ====
Republican primary results
Party	Candidate	Votes	%
Republican	Jim Renacci (incumbent)	107,039	100.0
Total votes		107,039	100.0

=== Democratic primary ===
==== Candidates ====
===== Nominee =====
- Keith Mundy

==== Results ====
Democratic primary results
Party	Candidate	Votes	%
Democratic	Keith Mundy	48,907	100.0
Total votes		48,907	100.0

=== General election ===
==== Predictions ====
Source	Ranking	As of
The Cook Political Report	Safe R	November 7, 2016
Daily Kos Elections	Safe R	November 7, 2016
Rothenberg	Safe R	November 3, 2016
Sabato's Crystal Ball	Safe R	November 7, 2016
RCP	Safe R	October 31, 2016

==== Results ====
Ohio's 16th congressional district, 2016
Party	Candidate	Votes	%
Republican	Jim Renacci (incumbent)	225,794	65.3
Democratic	Keith Mundy	119,830	34.7
Total votes		345,624	100.0
Republican hold			

=== Official campaign websites ===
- Keith Mundy for Congress
- Jim Renacci for Congress

== See also ==
- United States House of Representatives elections, 2016
- United States elections, 2016
