= Marcia Fudge =

American attorney and politician (born 1952)

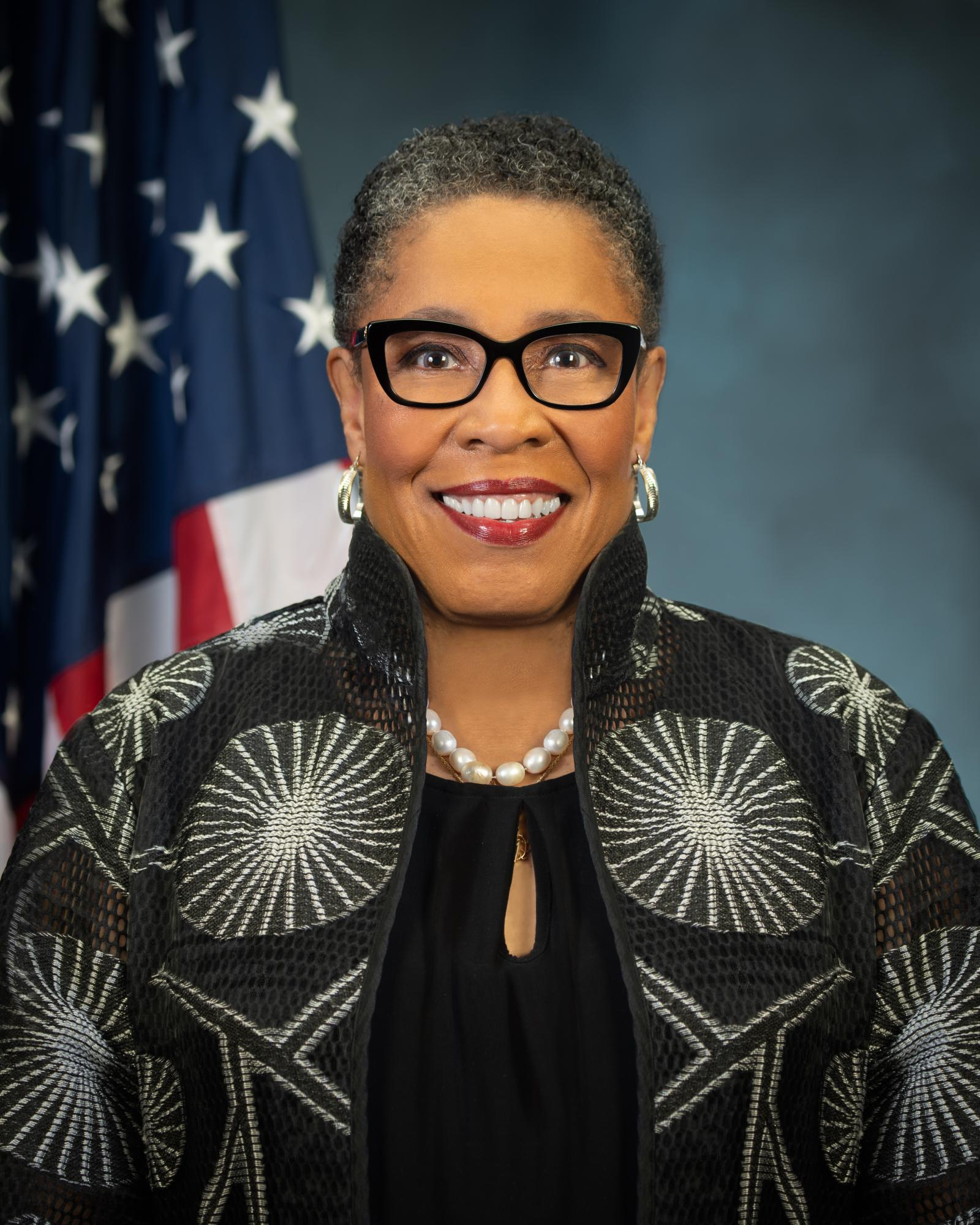
- Official portrait, 2021

18th United States Secretary of Housing and Urban Development
- In office March 10, 2021 – March 22, 2024
- President: Joe Biden
- Deputy: Adrianne Todman
- Preceded by: Ben Carson
- Succeeded by: Adrianne Todman (acting); Scott Turner

Chair of the Congressional Black Caucus
- In office January 3, 2013 – January 3, 2015
- Preceded by: Emanuel Cleaver
- Succeeded by: G. K. Butterfield

Member of the U.S. House of Representatives from Ohio's 11th district
- In office November 19, 2008 – March 10, 2021
- Preceded by: Stephanie Tubbs Jones
- Succeeded by: Shontel Brown

Mayor of Warrensville Heights
- In office January 16, 2000 – November 18, 2008
- Preceded by: Clinton Hall
- Succeeded by: William Pegues

Personal details
- Born: Marcia Louise Fudge; October 29, 1952 (age 73) Cleveland, Ohio, U.S.
- Party: Democratic
- Education: Ohio State University (BS); Cleveland State University (JD)
- Fudge's voice Fudge on discrimination in housing appraisals. Recorded March 12, 2022

Marcia Louise Fudge (born October 29, 1952) is an American attorney and retired politician who served as the 18th United States Secretary of Housing and Urban Development from 2021 to 2024. A member of the Democratic Party, she served as the U.S. representative for Ohio's 11th congressional district from 2008 to 2021. The district included most of the black-majority precincts between Cleveland and Akron.

Following the death of Stephanie Tubbs Jones in 2008, Fudge ran unopposed in the special election to replace Jones. She was chair of the Congressional Black Caucus in the 113th Congress. She considered running for Speaker of the United States House of Representatives at the start of the 116th Congress but eventually announced she would back Nancy Pelosi.

Then president-elect Joe Biden nominated Fudge as Secretary of Housing and Urban Development on December 10, 2020. The U.S. Senate Committee on Banking, Housing, and Urban Affairs advanced her nomination by a vote of 17–7 on February 4, 2021. She was confirmed by the United States Senate on March 10, 2021, by a vote of 66–34. She was virtually sworn in by Vice President Kamala Harris on March 10, 2021. Upon taking her oath of office, she became the second African American woman to serve as secretary of housing and urban development.

== Early life and education ==
Fudge was born in Cleveland, Ohio, on October 29, 1952. As a 1971 graduate of Shaker Heights High School, she earned her Bachelor of Science in business from the Ohio State University in 1975. In 1983, she earned a Juris Doctor from the Cleveland State University College of Law.

== Early political career ==
After college, she worked as a law clerk and studied legal research. She also worked in the Cuyahoga County prosecutor's office as Director of Budget and Finance. Fudge has also worked as an auditor for the county's estate tax department and has occasionally served as a visiting judge and as a chief referee for arbitration.

Fudge was the mayor of Warrensville Heights, Ohio, from 2000 to November 18, 2008. Her 1999 campaign was her first run for any elected office. She was the town's first female and first African American mayor.

Fudge served as chief of staff to U.S. Representative Stephanie Tubbs Jones during Jones's first term in Congress. She has also served on the board of trustees for the Cleveland Public Library.

== U.S. House of Representatives ==
=== Tenure ===
After Stephanie Tubbs Jones's death on August 20, 2008, a committee of local Democratic leaders selected Fudge as her replacement on the November ballot. This virtually assured her election in the heavily Democratic, black-majority district. Fudge won the November 4 general election, defeating Republican Thomas Pekarek with 85% of the vote. She was unopposed in a November 18 special election for the balance of Jones's fifth term, and won with fewer than nine thousand votes cast. She was sworn in on November 19, 2008, giving her almost two months' more seniority than the rest of the 2008 House freshman class.

After the 2018 midterms, Fudge considered running for Speaker of the House in the 2019 election. She later abandoned the bid and supported Nancy Pelosi.

After the 2020 United States presidential election, Fudge and allies including Representative Jim Clyburn argued that she should be appointed as Secretary of Agriculture in the Biden administration. Fudge was quoted as saying, "You know, it's always 'we want to put the Black person in Labor or HUD'." Biden eventually selected Tom Vilsack as his agriculture secretary; he chose Fudge as Secretary of Housing and Urban Development.

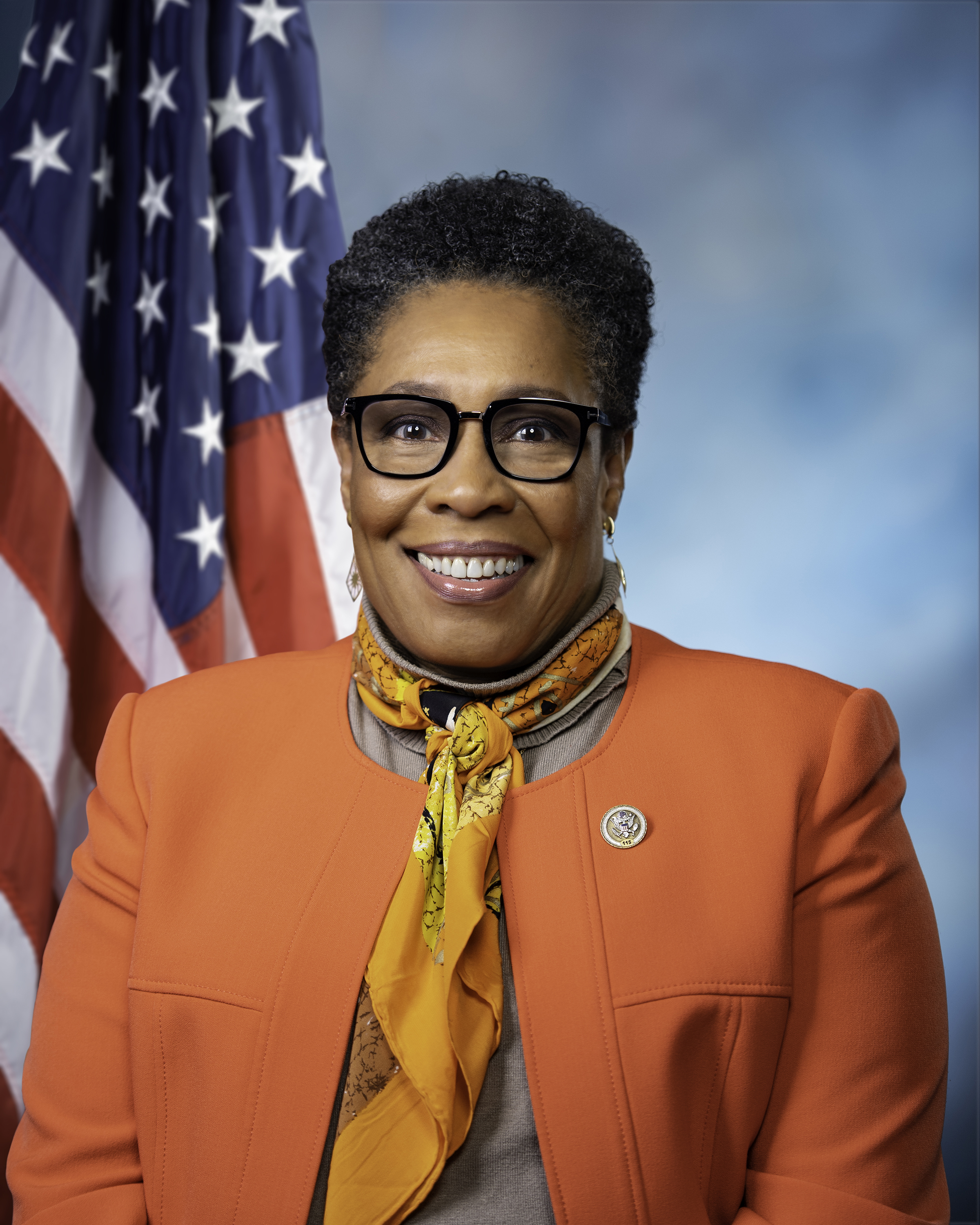
Fudge during the 116th Congress

Fudge resigned from the House of Representatives after being confirmed by the Senate as Secretary of Housing and Urban Development on March 10, 2021. A special election to replace her was held on November 2, 2021, with Shontel Brown elected to the seat.

=== Congressional Black Caucus ===
During a presentation at the Congressional Black Caucus Foundation's 44th Annual Legislative Conference in September 2014, Fudge said the CBC would mobilize Black voters in the 2014 midterm elections by underscoring Republican attacks on President Obama, such as false claims that he was not born in the United States.

=== Committee assignments ===
- Committee on Agriculture
  - Subcommittee on Conservation, Energy, and Forestry
  - Subcommittee on Nutrition, Oversight, and Department Operations (Chair)
- Committee on House Administration
  - Subcommittee on Elections (Chair)
- Committee on Education and Labor
  - Subcommittee on Civil Rights and Human Services

=== Caucus memberships ===
- Congressional Arts Caucus
- Congressional Black Caucus
- Congressional Progressive Caucus
- Congressional Asian Pacific American Caucus
- Medicare for All Caucus

== U.S. Secretary of Housing and Urban Development ==
Video of Fudge being sworn in by Vice President Kamala Harris

On December 10, 2020, President Biden announced his plan to nominate Fudge for Secretary of Housing and Urban Development. She appeared before the Senate Committee on Banking, Housing, and Urban Affairs on January 28, 2021. On February 4, committee chairman Sherrod Brown advanced her nomination after a 17–7 vote in favor.

On March 10, 2021, Fudge was confirmed by the Senate by a 66–34 vote, garnering the support of every senator caucusing with the Democratic Party and 16 senators from the Republican caucus. She was sworn in by Vice President Kamala Harris hours after her confirmation.

=== Tenure ===
==== Hatch Act violation ====
In March 2021, during a White House press conference, Fudge made comments on the upcoming Senate election in her home state of Ohio suggesting that Democrats could win it. As a result, she was accused of violating the Hatch Act of 1939. After an investigation, the Office of Special Counsel determined she had violated the Hatch Act. Fudge received a warning.

==== Racial impact of housing problems ====
In one of her first acts as secretary, Fudge discussed the effects of homelessness on people of color, evictions in the United States, and creating avenues for fair housing with civil rights leaders including Marc Morial and Al Sharpton.

==== Resignation ====
On March 11, 2024, Fudge announced her resignation to take effect on March 22, stepping down from public life. She is now a partner at the law firm of Taft Stettinius & Hollister.

== Electoral history ==
Ohio's 11th congressional district
Year	Election	Subject	Party	Votes	%	Opponent	Party	Votes	%	Opponent	Party	Votes	%
2008	Special	Marcia Fudge	Democratic	8,597	100%								
2008	General	Marcia Fudge	Democratic	212,485	85.2%	Thomas Pekarek	Republican	36,705	14.7%	Craig Willis	Independent	144	0.1%
2010	General	Marcia Fudge	Democratic	139,693	82.9%	Thomas Pekarek	Republican	28,754	17.1%				
2012	General	Marcia Fudge	Democratic	258,378	100%								
2014	General	Marcia Fudge	Democratic	132,396	79.2%	Mark Zetzer	Republican	34,769	20.8%				
2016	General	Marcia Fudge	Democratic	233,285	80.1%	Beverly Goldstein	Republican	58,066	19.9%				
2018	General	Marcia Fudge	Democratic	206,138	81.9%	Beverly Goldstein	Republican	48,866	14.9%				
2020	General	Marcia Fudge	Democratic	242,098	80.1%	Laverne Gore	Republican	60,323	19.9%				

== Personal life ==
Fudge was the president of the Delta Sigma Theta sorority from 1996 to 2000, co-chair of the sorority's National Social Action Commission, and a member of its Greater Cleveland Alumnae Chapter. In 2003, she was a member of the Shaker Heights Alumni Association's Hall of Fame Class.

Fudge has been a member of the Glenville Church of God and is currently a member of Zion Chapel Baptist Church.

In 2015, Fudge wrote a letter asking for leniency in the sentencing of Cleveland politician Lance Mason on felony assault and domestic violence charges. Fudge described Mason as "kind", and wrote that "Lance [...] has assured me that something like this will never happen again." Mason subsequently attacked and killed his ex-wife, in 2018, stabbing her 69 times. After the murder, Fudge released a statement saying she condemned the crimes committed by Mason.

== See also ==
- List of African-American United States representatives
- Women in the United States House of Representatives
- List of African-American United States Cabinet members
- List of female United States Cabinet members

U.S. House of Representatives
Preceded by Stephanie Tubbs Jones	Member of the U.S. House of Representatives from Ohio's 11th congressional district 2008–2021	Succeeded by Shontel Brown
Preceded by Emanuel Cleaver	Chair of the Congressional Black Caucus; 2013–2015	Succeeded by G. K. Butterfield
Party political offices
Preceded by Antonio Villaraigosa	Permanent Chair of the Democratic National Convention; 2016	Succeeded by Bennie Thompson
Political offices
Preceded by Ben Carson	United States Secretary of Housing and Urban Development; 2021–2024	Succeeded by Adrianne Todman; Acting
U.S. order of precedence (ceremonial)
Preceded by Gina Raimondo as Former U.S. Cabinet Member	Order of precedence of the United States as Former U.S. Cabinet Member	Succeeded by Merrick Garland as Former U.S. Cabinet Member
