= Stephanie Tubbs Jones =

American politician (1949–2008)

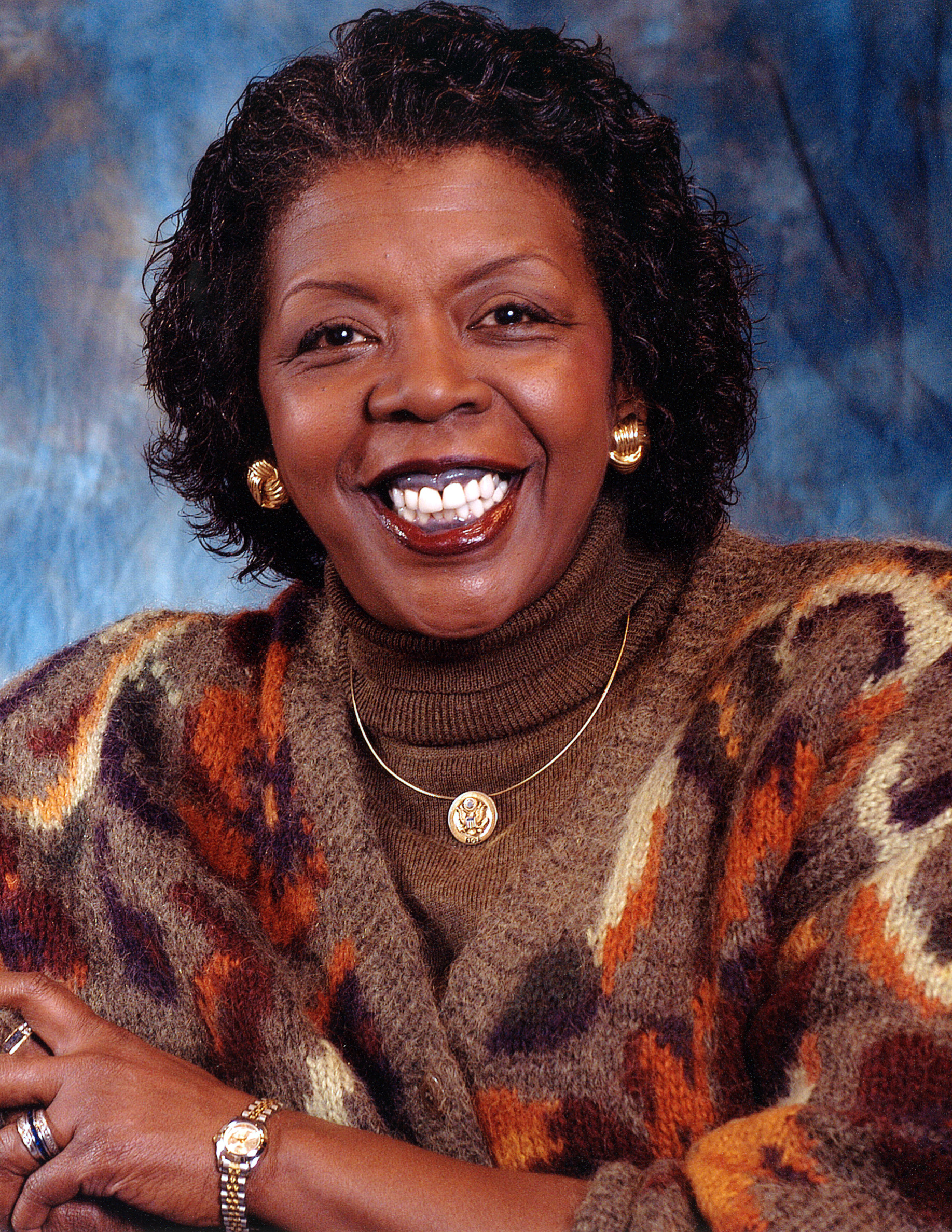

Chair of the House Ethics Committee
- In office January 3, 2007 – August 20, 2008
- Preceded by: Doc Hastings
- Succeeded by: Gene Green (Acting)

Member of the U.S. House of Representatives from Ohio's 11th district
- In office January 3, 1999 – August 20, 2008
- Preceded by: Louis Stokes
- Succeeded by: Marcia Fudge

Personal details
- Born: Stephanie Tubbs; September 10, 1949 Cleveland, Ohio, U.S.
- Died: August 20, 2008 (aged 58) East Cleveland, Ohio, U.S.
- Party: Democratic
- Spouse: Mervyn Jones (m. 1976; died 2003)
- Children: 1
- Education: Case Western Reserve University (BA, JD)

Stephanie Tubbs Jones (September 10, 1949 – August 20, 2008) was an American politician who served as the U.S. representative for Ohio's 11th congressional district from 1999 until her death in 2008. A member of the Democratic Party, her district encompassed most of Downtown and Eastern Cleveland and many of the eastern suburbs in Cuyahoga County, including Euclid, Cleveland Heights and Shaker Heights. She was the first African American woman to be elected to Congress from Ohio.

On December 19, 2006, Tubbs Jones was named Chairwoman of the House Committee on Standards of Official Conduct for the 110th Congress. She was also a member of the House Ways and Means Committee. On August 19, 2008, Tubbs Jones was found unconscious in her car, having suffered a cerebral hemorrhage caused by a ruptured aneurysm. She was taken to Huron Road Hospital in East Cleveland, where she died the next day.

== Early life, education and family ==
Tubbs Jones was born in Cleveland, the daughter of Mary, a factory worker and cook, and Andrew Tubbs, an airline skycap. She graduated from the city's Collinwood High School. She earned an undergraduate degree from Case Western Reserve University, graduating with a degree in Social Work from the Flora Stone Mather College in 1971. In 1974, she earned a Juris Doctor from the Case Western Reserve University School of Law.

On November 27, 1976, she married Mervyn L. Jones. Less than a year before they married, Mervyn Jones had been charged with aggravated murder and robbery. He eventually pleaded guilty to a lesser count of manslaughter and received "shock probation." The couple were married for 27 years until Mervyn's death, October 2, 2003. They had one son, Mervyn Leroy Jones Jr. Tubbs Jones was a member of Delta Sigma Theta sorority. She was actively involved in the National Five Point Thrust Programs of her sorority, particularly Social Action and Political Awareness as an integral part of "Delta Days at the Nations Capital".

Tubbs Jones was Golden Life Member of the National Association for the Advancement of Colored People.

== Political and legal career ==
Tubbs Jones was elected a judge of the Cleveland Municipal Court (1981) and subsequently served on the Court of Common Pleas of Cuyahoga County (1983–91).

In 1990, she ran for Justice of the Supreme Court of Ohio replacing Mary Cacioppo, the winner of the Democratic Primary, who withdrew for health reasons. She narrowly lost that race to Republican incumbent J. Craig Wright.

She then served as the Cuyahoga County Prosecutor from 1991 until resigning in early 1999 to take her seat in Congress. She was the first African American prosecutor in Ohio history, and during her tenure she was the only black woman to serve as prosecutor in any major American city. She was succeeded as prosecutor by William D. Mason.

Tubbs Jones served as board member of Hawken School from 1996–2004.

== U.S. House of Representatives ==
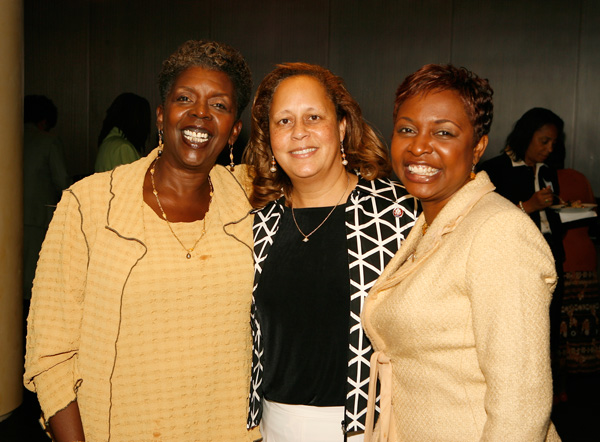
Stephanie Tubbs Jones (left) with fellow U.S. Representatives Laura Richardson of California (center) and Yvette Clarke of New York (right)

In 1998, Tubbs Jones won the Democratic nomination for the 11th congressional district after 30-year incumbent Louis Stokes announced his retirement. This all but assured her of election in the heavily Democratic, black-majority 11th. She won with 80 percent of the vote and was reelected four times with no substantive opposition.

Tubbs Jones was a co-chairwoman of the Democratic National Committee. She opposed the Iraq war, voting in 2002 against the use of military force. Despite representing a heavily unionized district, she was a strong proponent of free trade. Tubbs Jones most recently took a lead role in the fight to pass the United States – Peru Trade Promotion Agreement in November 2007.

In 2004, she served as the chairwoman of the platform committee at the Democratic National Convention and as a member of the Ohio delegation. She strongly supported Sen. John Kerry in his campaign to become President of the United States. On January 6, 2005, she joined U.S. Senator Barbara Boxer (D-CA) in objecting to the certification of the 2004 U.S. presidential election results for Ohio.

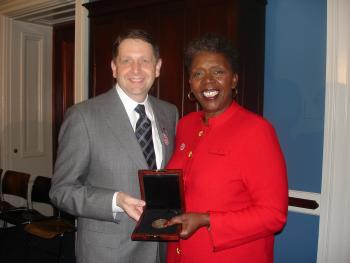
Marc Katz (left), President of the North American Interfraternity Conference presents Tubbs Jones with the NIC Silver Medal.

As the sponsor, she was one of the 31 who voted in the House to not count the 20 electoral votes from Ohio in the 2004 election. Republican President George Bush won the state by 118,457 votes.

In 2005, she came under fire from certain individuals after being named the congressperson with the fourth-highest (59) total trips sponsored by lobbyists. She was selected by Speaker Nancy Pelosi as chairperson of the House Ethics Committee to watch over the standards of ethical conduct for members of the House. Tubbs Jones was popular in her district, and was routinely reelected against nominal Republican opposition. She received 83.44% of the vote in her final general election in 2006, against Republican Lindsey String. She faced no opposition in the 2008 Ohio Democratic primary.

Tubbs Jones appeared on The Colbert Report's "Better Know a District" in an episode which aired November 3, 2005. In the skit, Colbert suggested she create a spin-off vehicle for herself as "Judge Tubbs." She became a good friend of the show after the broadcast. Colbert paid tribute to Tubbs Jones at the close of his August 27, 2008 broadcast by airing her "Judge Tubbs" footage.

Tubbs Jones was a strong and early supporter of Hillary Clinton in Clinton's run for president in the 2008 Democratic presidential primary. She later supported Barack Obama after Clinton conceded.

In 2002, Tubbs Jones publicly praised Barbara Byrd-Bennett while she was CEO of the Cleveland Municipal School District, who over a decade later became a confessed, convicted felon due to fraud she committed while she was the CEO of Chicago Public Schools.

== Death ==
On August 19, 2008, while driving her car, Congresswoman Tubbs Jones suffered a cerebral hemorrhage due to a burst aneurysm in her brain. Police had noticed erratic driving and identified the unconscious Tubbs Jones after her vehicle left the roadway and came to a stop in a field. She was taken to the intensive care unit of Huron Hospital, a satellite of the Cleveland Clinic, where she was put on life support. Due to hemorrhaging, she remained in unstable and critical condition.

Tubbs Jones died August 20 at 6:12 p.m. EDT of complications from the brain hemorrhage. A special election was ordered by Ohio Governor Ted Strickland for November 18, 2008, to elect a successor to serve out the remainder of her term. Warrensville Heights Mayor Marcia Fudge, the Democratic nominee, won the election.

== Electoral history ==
Ohio's 11th congressional district: Results 1998–2006
Year	Democrat	Votes	Pct	Republican	Votes	Pct	3rd Party	Party	Votes	Pct	3rd Party	Party	Votes	Pct
1998	Stephanie Tubbs Jones	115,226	80%	James Hereford	18,592	13%	Jean M. Capers	Independent	9,477	7%				
2000	Stephanie Tubbs Jones	164,134	85%	James J. Sykora	21,630	11%	Joel C. Turner	Libertarian	4,230	2%	Sonja Glavina	Natural Law	3,525	2%
2002	Stephanie Tubbs Jones	116,590	76%	Patrick Pappano	36,146	24%								
2004	Stephanie Tubbs Jones	222,371	100%	(no candidate)										
2006	Stephanie Tubbs Jones	146,799	83%	Lindsey N. String	29,125	17%								

== See also ==
- List of United States representatives from Ohio
- List of African-American United States representatives
- Women in the United States House of Representatives
- List of members of the United States Congress who died in office (2000–present)#2000s

U.S. House of Representatives
Preceded by Louis Stokes	Member of the U.S. House of Representatives from Ohio's 11th congressional district 1999–2008	Succeeded by Marcia Fudge
Preceded by Doc Hastings	Chair of the House Ethics Committee; 2007–2008	Succeeded by Gene Green; Acting
