= 2008 Ohio's 11th congressional district special election =

- November 18, 2008
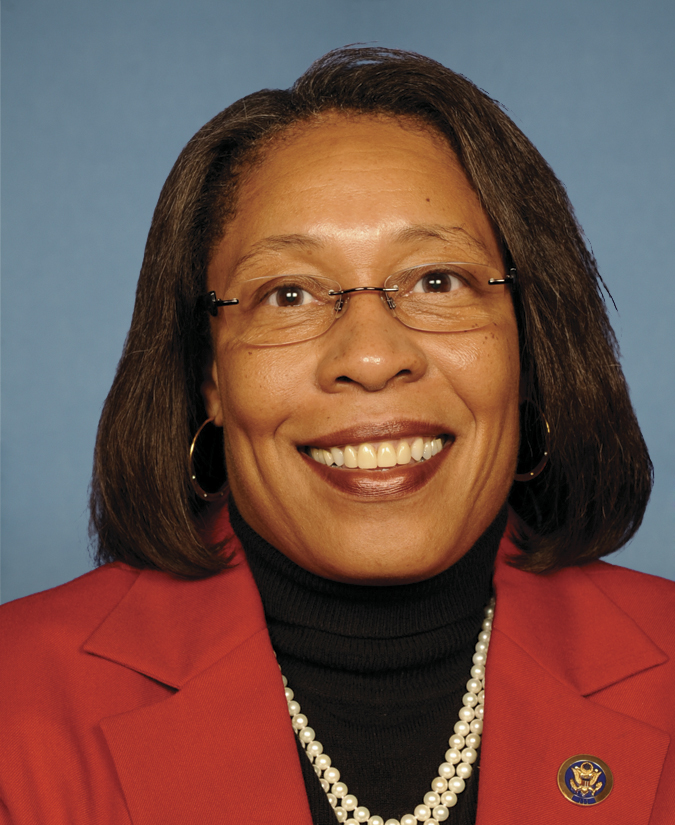
Candidate	Marcia Fudge
Party	Democratic
Popular vote	8,450
Percentage	97.2%
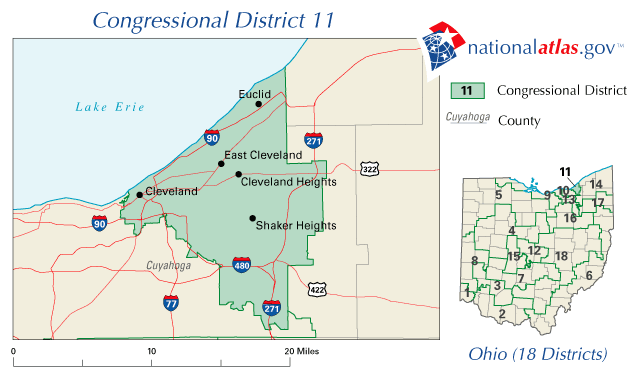
Representative before election
Vacant
Elected Representative
Marcia Fudge
Democratic

Ohio's 11th congressional district special election, 2008 took place on November 18, 2008. The seat of the U.S. representative for Ohio's 11th congressional district was vacated following the death of Democrat Stephanie Tubbs Jones on August 20, 2008. Since more than one candidate from the Democratic Party filed to take part in the election, a primary was held on October 14, 2008. The special election was won by Marcia Fudge.

== Candidates ==
=== Democratic primary election ===
Fifteen Democratic candidates qualified for the primary election, fourteen of whom appeared on the ballot and one of which qualified as a write-in candidate. Four candidates withdrew, but their names still appeared on the ballot. Votes for such candidates were not counted.

- Brahim Ayad – A write-in candidate
- Marcia L. Fudge – Mayor of Warrensville Heights who was picked by county Democratic Party to replace Jones in the regular election
- Gerald Henley
- Carolyn Johnson
- Jeffrey Johnson
- Jim Joyner – Withdrawal via letter dated September 19
- Nathaniel Martin
- Marvin McMickle – Withdrawal via letter dated September 15
- Bill Patmon – Withdrawal via letter dated September 12
- Isaac Powell
- C. J. Prentiss – Withdrawal via letter dated September 15
- Frank Rives
- Sean Ryan
- Thomas Wheeler

=== Special election ===
Only Marcia L. Fudge appeared on the ballot for the special election.

== Results ==
=== Democratic primary election ===
Democratic primary election, October 14, 2008
Candidate	Votes	Percentage
Marcia Fudge	10,753	74.27%
Jeffrey Johnson	2,028	14.01%
Carolyn Johnson	690	4.77%
Sean Ryan	241	1.66%
Thomas Wheeler	175	1.21%
Isaac Powell	162	1.12%
Frank Rives	155	1.07%
Nathaniel Martin	138	0.95%
Gerald Henley	136	0.94%
Brahim Ayad (write-in)	0	0.00%
Totals	14,478	100.00%
Voter turnout	3.00%	

=== Special election ===
Ohio's 11th congressional district special election, 2008
Party	Candidate	Votes	%
Democratic	Marcia Fudge	8,450	97.19
Invalid or blank votes		244	2.81
Total votes		8,694	100.00
Turnout			1.77
Democratic hold			

== See also ==
- United States House of Representatives elections in Ohio, 2008
