= 2014 United States House of Representatives elections in Ohio =

- November 4, 2014

All 16 Ohio seats to the United States House of Representatives
	Majority party	Minority party
Party	Republican	Democratic
Last election	12	4
Seats won	12	4
Seat change	Steady	Steady
Popular vote	1,770,923	1,179,587
Percentage	60.02%	39.98%
Swing	▲9.06%	▼6.93%

Republican
40–50%
50–60%
60–70%
70–80%
80–90%
90–100%
Democratic
50–60%
60–70%
70–80%

The 2014 United States House of Representatives elections in Ohio were held on Tuesday, November 4, 2014, to elect the 16 U.S. representatives from the state of Ohio, one from each of the state's 16 congressional districts. The elections coincided with the elections of other federal and state offices, including a gubernatorial election.

== Overview ==
=== Statewide ===
Party	Candidates	Votes		Seats		
Party	Candidates	No.	%	No.	+/–	%
Republican	16	1,770,923	59.23	12	Steady	75.00
Democratic	15	1,179,587	39.45	4	Steady	25.00
Libertarian	3	23,937	0.80	0	Steady	0.00
Green	2	15,213	0.51	0	Steady	0.00
Constitution	1	10,257	0.34	0	Steady	0.00
Write-in	4	244	0.01	0	Steady	0.00
Total	41	3,000,161	100.0	16	Steady	100.0

Popular vote
Republican	59.03%
Democratic	39.32%
Other	1.65%

House seats
Republican	75.00%
Democratic	25.00%

=== District ===
Results of the 2014 United States House of Representatives elections in Ohio by district:

District	Republican		Democratic		Others		Total		Result
District	Votes	%	Votes	%	Votes	%	Votes	%	Result
District 1	124,779	63.22%	72,604	36.78%	0	0.00%	197,383	100.00%	Republican hold
District 2	132,658	65.96%	68,453	34.04%	0	0.00%	201,111	100.00%	Republican hold
District 3	51,475	35.93%	91,769	64.06%	17	0.01%	143,261	100.00%	Democratic hold
District 4	125,907	67.67%	60,165	32.33%	0	0.00%	186,072	100.00%	Republican hold
District 5	134,449	66.46%	58,507	28.92%	9,344	4.62%	202,300	100.00%	Republican hold
District 6	111,026	58.23%	73,561	38.58%	6,065	3.18%	190,652	100.00%	Republican hold
District 7	143,959	100.00%			0	0.00%	143,959	100.00%	Republican hold
District 8	126,539	67.19%	51,534	27.36%	10,257	5.45%	188,330	100.00%	Republican hold
District 9	51,704	32.17%	108,870	67.74%	141	0.09%	160,715	100.00%	Democratic hold
District 10	130,752	65.18%	63,249	31.53%	6,605	3.29%	200,606	100.00%	Republican hold
District 11	35,461	20.55%	137,105	79.45%	0	0.00%	172,566	100.00%	Democratic hold
District 12	150,573	68.11%	61,360	27.75%	9,148	4.14%	221,081	100.00%	Republican hold
District 13	55,233	31.46%	120,230	68.49%	86	0.05%	175,549	100.00%	Democratic hold
District 14	135,736	63.26%	70,856	33.02%	7,988	3.72%	214,580	100.00%	Republican hold
District 15	128,496	66.02%	66,125	33.98%	0	0.00%	194,621	100.00%	Republican hold
District 16	132,176	63.74%	75,199	36.26%	0	0.00%	207,375	100.00%	Republican hold
Total	1,770,923	59.03%	1,179,587	39.32%	49,651	1.65%	3,000,161	100.00%	

== District 1 ==
2014 Ohio's 1st congressional district election
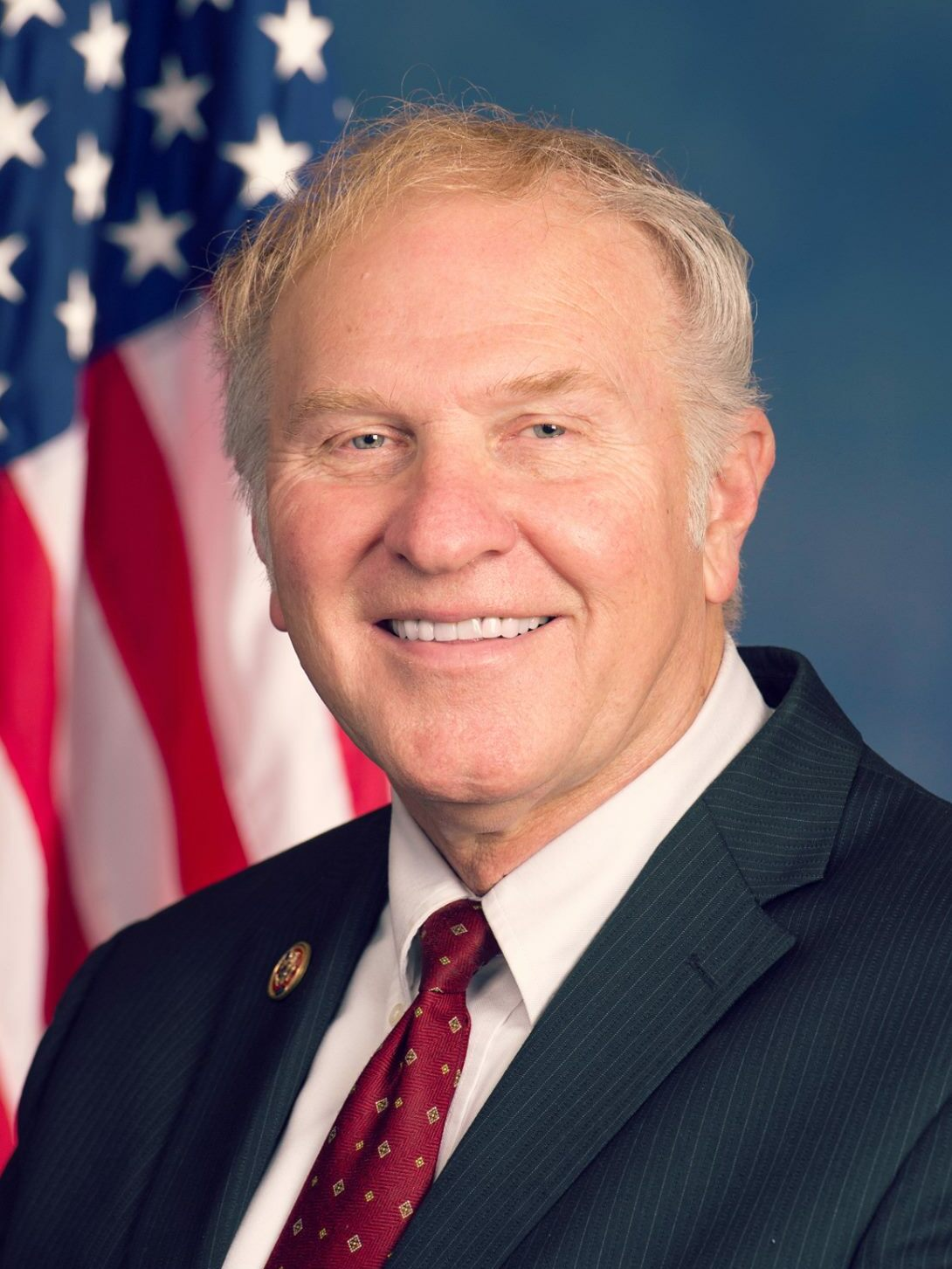

Nominee	Steve Chabot	Fred Kundrata
Party	Republican	Democratic
Popular vote	124,779	72,604
Percentage	63.2%	36.8%
- County results Chabot: 50–60% 70–80%
U.S. Representative before election
Steve Chabot
Republican
Elected U.S. Representative
Steve Chabot
Republican

The 1st district is based in Cincinnati, stretching southwestward to Ohio's borders with Kentucky and Indiana. It was represented by two-term Republican Congressman Steve Chabot.

=== Republican primary ===
==== Candidates ====
===== Nominee =====
- Steve Chabot, incumbent U.S. Representative

==== Primary results ====
Republican primary results
Party	Candidate	Votes	%
Republican	Steve Chabot (incumbent)	31,953	100.0

=== Democratic primary ===
==== Candidates ====
===== Nominee =====
- Fred Kundrata, Air Force veteran and Republican candidate for Ohio's 2nd congressional district in 2012

===== Eliminated in primary =====
- Jim Prues, marketing executive

==== Primary results ====
Democratic primary results
Party	Candidate	Votes	%
Democratic	Fred Kundrata	7,369	55.9
Democratic	Jim Prues	5,814	44.1
Total votes		13,183	100.0

=== General election ===
==== Endorsements ====
Steve Chabot (R)

Organizations

- National Federation of Independent Business
- National Rifle Association - Political Victory Fund
- National Right to Life Committee
Fred Kundrata (D)

U.S Senators

- Sherrod Brown, U.S. Senator (2007–present)

Labor unions

- AFL-CIO
- Communications Workers of America
- International Brotherhood of Boilermakers
- International Brotherhood of Electrical Workers
- Sheet Metal Workers' International Association

Organizations

- Alliance for Retired Americans

Local officials

- John Cranley, Mayor of Cincinnati (2013–present)
- Chris Seelbach, Member of Cincinnati City Council
- Wendell Young, Member of Cincinnati City Council

==== Predictions ====
Source	Ranking	As of
The Cook Political Report	Safe R	November 3, 2014
Rothenberg	Safe R	October 24, 2014
Sabato's Crystal Ball	Safe R	October 30, 2014
RCP	Safe R	November 2, 2014
Daily Kos Elections	Safe R	November 4, 2014

==== Results ====
Ohio's 1st congressional district, 2014
Party	Candidate	Votes	%
Republican	Steve Chabot (incumbent)	124,779	63.2
Democratic	Fred Kundrata	72,604	36.8
Total votes		197,383	100.0
Republican hold			

== District 2 ==
2014 Ohio's 2nd congressional district election
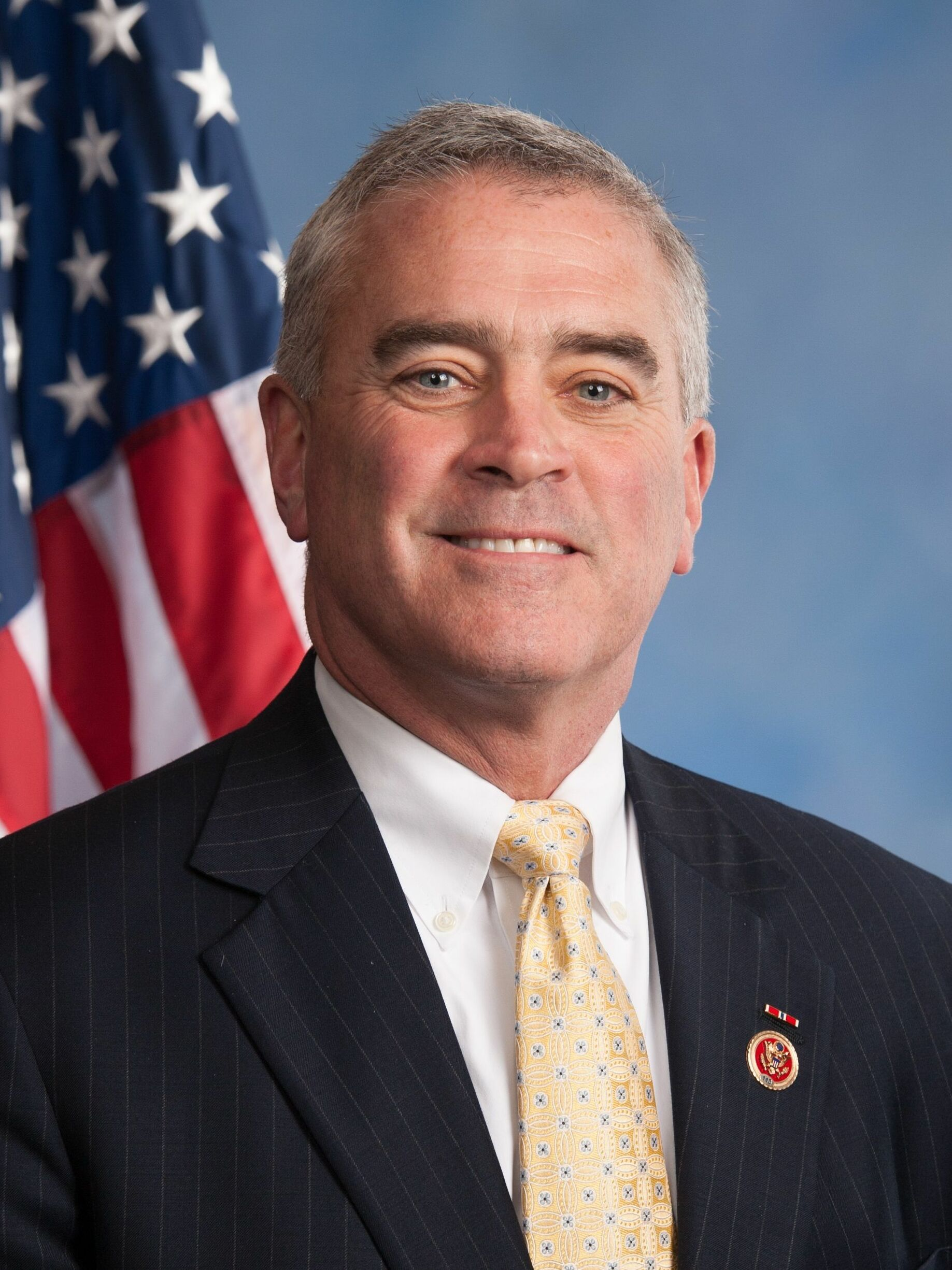

Nominee	Brad Wenstrup	Marek Tyszkiewicz
Party	Republican	Democratic
Popular vote	132,658	68,453
Percentage	66.0%	34.0%
- County results Wenstrup: 50–60% 60–70% 70–80%
U.S. Representative before election
Brad Wenstrup
Republican
Elected U.S. Representative
Brad Wenstrup
Republican

The 2nd district takes eastern Cincinnati and its suburbs, including Norwood and Loveland, and stretches eastward along the Ohio River. This seat had been held by Republican Brad Wenstrup since 2013.

=== Republican primary ===
==== Candidates ====
===== Nominee =====
- Brad Wenstrup, incumbent U.S. Representative

==== Primary results ====
Republican primary results
Party	Candidate	Votes	%
Republican	Brad Wenstrup (incumbent)	37,134	100.0

=== Democratic primary ===
==== Candidates ====
===== Nominee =====
- Marek Tyszkiewicz, actuary and former high school teacher

===== Eliminated in primary =====
- Ronny Richards, Vietnam War veteran
- John Sheil, attorney
- William Smith, truck driver and nominee for this district in 2012

==== Primary results ====
Democratic primary results
Party	Candidate	Votes	%
Democratic	Marek Tyszkiewicz	4,812	29.7
Democratic	Ronny Richards	3,995	24.7
Democratic	William R. Smith	3,974	24.5
Democratic	John Sheil	3,416	21.1
Total votes		16,197	100.0

=== General election ===
==== Endorsements ====
Brad Wenstrup (R)

Organizations

- National Federation of Independent Business
- National Rifle Association - Political Victory Fund
- National Right to Life Committee
Marek Tyszkiewicz (D)

U.S Senators

- Sherrod Brown, U.S. Senator (2007–present)

Labor unions

- AFL-CIO
- American Federation of State, County and Municipal Employees
- International Brotherhood of Boilermakers
- International Brotherhood of Electrical Workers
- Sheet Metal Workers' International Association
- United Auto Workers

Organizations

- Alliance for Retired Americans
- National Organization for Women
- Sierra Club

==== Predictions ====
Source	Ranking	As of
The Cook Political Report	Safe R	November 3, 2014
Rothenberg	Safe R	October 24, 2014
Sabato's Crystal Ball	Safe R	October 30, 2014
RCP	Safe R	November 2, 2014
Daily Kos Elections	Safe R	November 4, 2014

==== Results ====
Ohio's 2nd congressional district, 2014
Party	Candidate	Votes	%
Republican	Brad Wenstrup (incumbent)	132,658	66.0
Democratic	Marek Tyszkiewicz	68,453	34.0
Total votes		201,111	100.0
Republican hold			

== District 3 ==
2014 Ohio's 3rd congressional district election
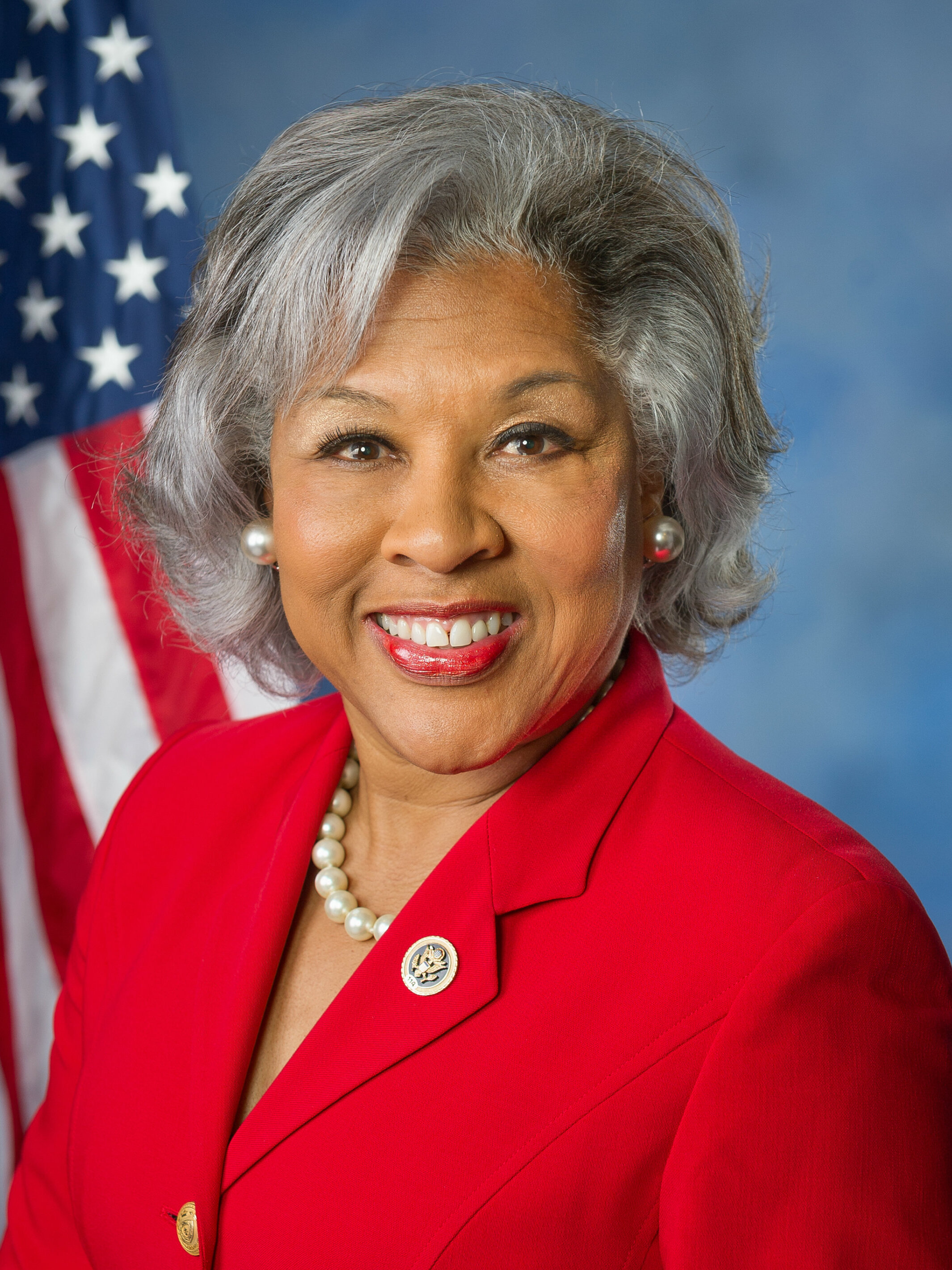

Nominee	Joyce Beatty	John Adams
Party	Democratic	Republican
Popular vote	91,769	51,475
Percentage	64.1%	35.9%
- County results Beatty: 60–70%
U.S. Representative before election
Joyce Beatty
Democratic
Elected U.S. Representative
Joyce Beatty
Democratic

The 3rd district, located entirely within the borders of Franklin County, taking in inner Columbus, Bexley, Whitehall, as well as Franklin County's share of Reynoldsburg. It had been represented by Democrat Joyce Beatty since 2013.

=== Democratic primary ===
==== Candidates ====
===== Nominee =====
- Joyce Beatty, incumbent U.S. Representative

==== Primary results ====
Democratic primary results
Party	Candidate	Votes	%
Democratic	Joyce Beatty (incumbent)	25,151	100.0

=== Republican primary ===
==== Candidates ====
===== Nominee =====
- John Adams, manufacturing company owner and candidate for this seat in 2012

===== Eliminated in primary =====
- Eric Vennon

==== Primary results ====
Republican primary results
Party	Candidate	Votes	%
Republican	John Adams	10,045	58.8
Republican	Eric Vennon	7,032	41.2
Total votes		17,077	100.0

=== General election ===
==== Endorsements ====
Joyce Beatty (D)

Labor unions

- AFL-CIO
- International Brotherhood of Boilermakers
- National Association of Letter Carriers

Organizations

- Human Rights Campaign
- National Organization for Women
- Sierra Club

==== Predictions ====
Source	Ranking	As of
The Cook Political Report	Safe D	November 3, 2014
Rothenberg	Safe D	October 24, 2014
Sabato's Crystal Ball	Safe D	October 30, 2014
RCP	Safe D	November 2, 2014
Daily Kos Elections	Safe D	November 4, 2014

==== Results ====
Ohio's 3rd congressional district, 2014
Party	Candidate	Votes	%
Democratic	Joyce Beatty (incumbent)	91,769	64.1
Republican	John Adams	51,475	35.9
Independent	Ralph A. Applegate (write-in)	17	0.0
Total votes		143,261	100.0
Democratic hold			

== District 4 ==
2014 Ohio's 4th congressional district election
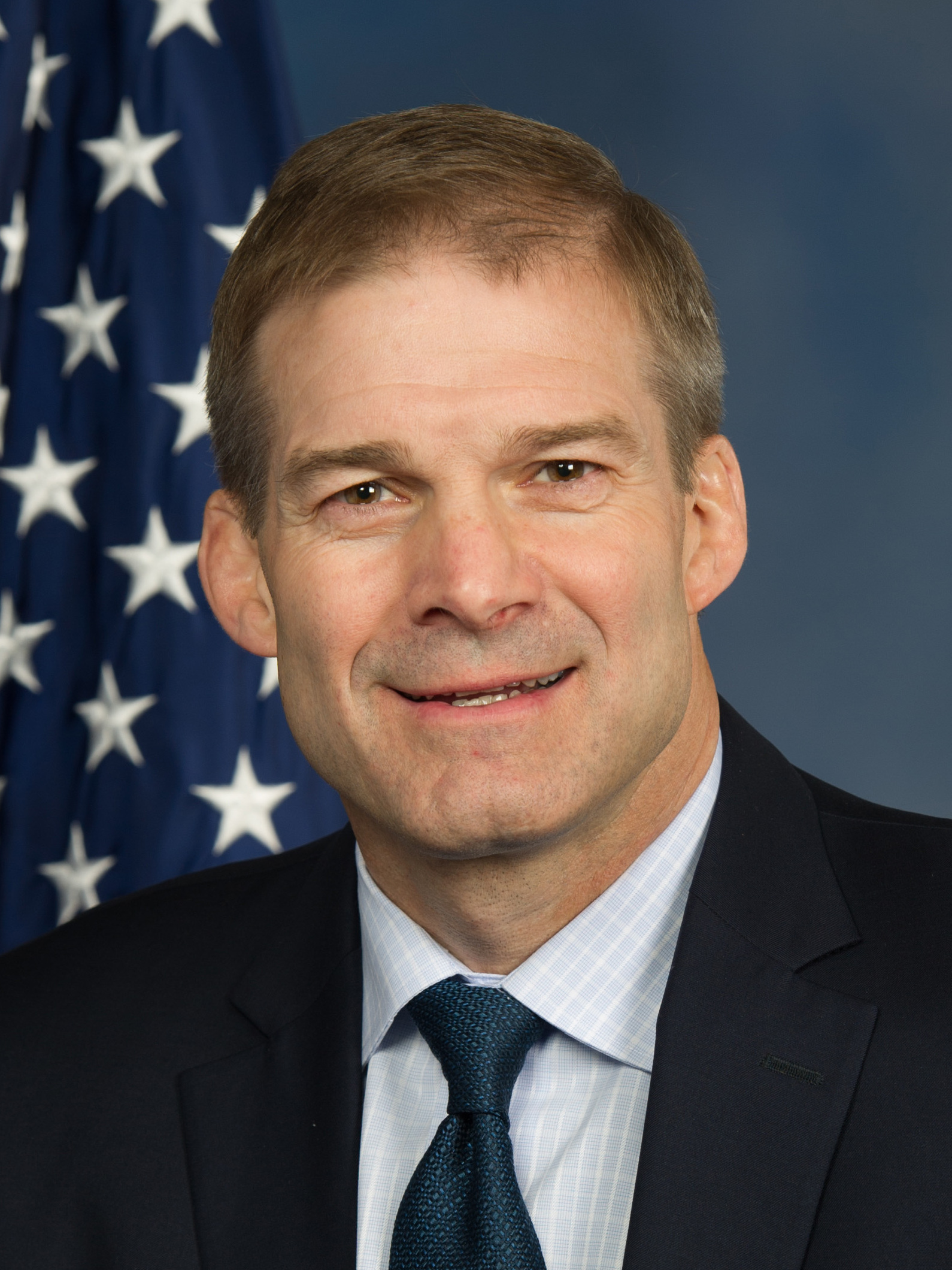

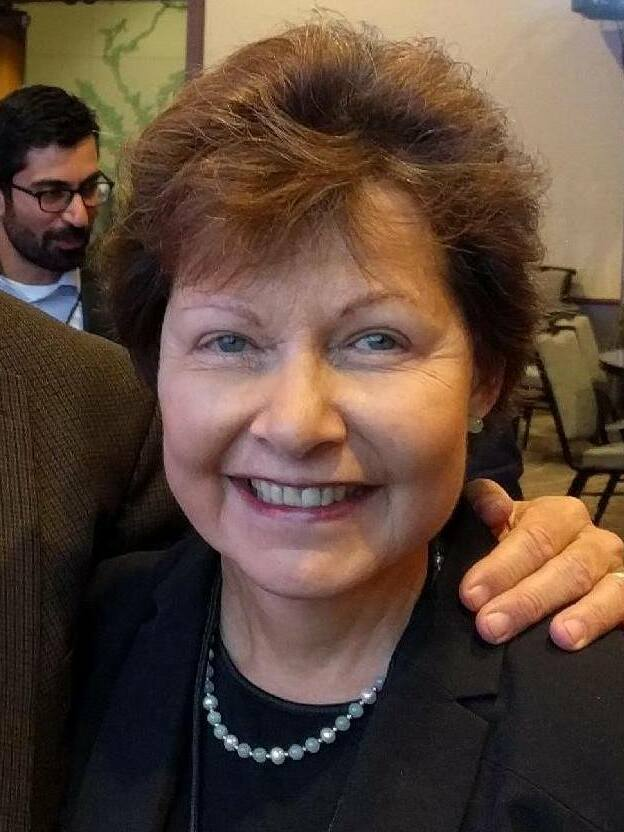
Nominee	Jim Jordan	Janet Garrett
Party	Republican	Democratic
Popular vote	125,907	60,165
Percentage	67.7%	32.3%
- County results Jordan: 60–70% 70–80% 80–90% Garrett: 50–60%
U.S. Representative before election
Jim Jordan
Republican
Elected U.S. Representative
Jim Jordan
Republican

The 4th district, nicknamed the "duck district", sprawls from the Columbus exurbs, including Marion and Lima into north-central Ohio, taking in Oberlin. It had been represented by Republican Jim Jordan since 2007.

=== Republican primary ===
==== Candidates ====
===== Nominee =====
- Jim Jordan, incumbent U.S. Representative

==== Primary results ====
Republican primary results
Party	Candidate	Votes	%
Republican	Jim Jordan (incumbent)	47,967	100.0

=== Democratic primary ===
==== Candidates ====
===== Nominee =====
- Janet Garrett, retired teacher

==== Primary results ====
Democratic primary results
Party	Candidate	Votes	%
Democratic	Janet Garrett	1,471	100.0

=== General election ===
==== Endorsements ====
Jim Jordan (R)

Organizations

- National Federation of Independent Business
- National Rifle Association - Political Victory Fund
- National Right to Life Committee
- Republican Liberty Caucus

Newspapers

- Cleveland Plain Dealer
Janet Garrett (D)

Labor unions

- AFL-CIO
- International Brotherhood of Boilermakers

==== Predictions ====
Source	Ranking	As of
The Cook Political Report	Safe R	November 3, 2014
Rothenberg	Safe R	October 24, 2014
Sabato's Crystal Ball	Safe R	October 30, 2014
RCP	Safe R	November 2, 2014
Daily Kos Elections	Safe R	November 4, 2014

==== Results ====
Ohio's 4th congressional district, 2014
Party	Candidate	Votes	%
Republican	Jim Jordan (incumbent)	125,907	67.7
Democratic	Janet Garrett	60,165	32.3
Total votes		186,072	100.0
Republican hold			

== District 5 ==
2014 Ohio's 5th congressional district election
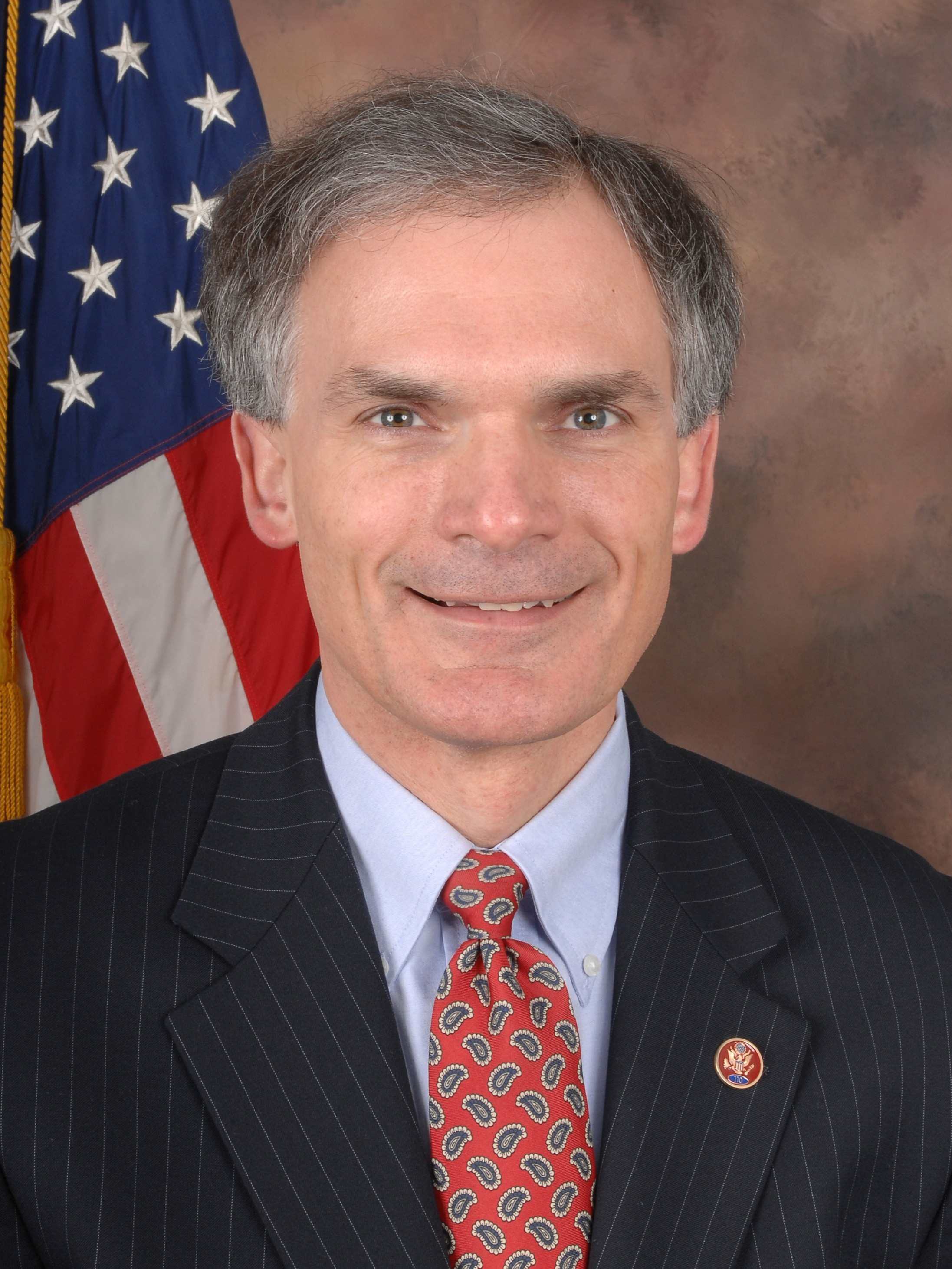

Nominee	Bob Latta	Robert Fry
Party	Republican	Democratic
Popular vote	134,449	58,507
Percentage	66.5%	28.9%
- County results Latta: 50–60% 60–70% 70–80% 80–90%
U.S. Representative before election
Bob Latta
Republican
Elected U.S. Representative
Bob Latta
Republican

The 5th district encompasses Northwestern Ohio, taking in Findlay, Defiance, and Bowling Green. It had been represented by Republican Bob Latta since 2007.

=== Republican primary ===
==== Candidates ====
===== Nominee =====
- Bob Latta, incumbent U.S. Representative

==== Primary results ====
Republican primary results
Party	Candidate	Votes	%
Republican	Bob Latta (incumbent)	42,288	100.0

=== Democratic primary ===
==== Candidates ====
===== Nominee =====
- Robert Fry, clergy

==== Primary results ====
Democratic primary results
Party	Candidate	Votes	%
Democratic	Robert Fry	16,460	100.0

=== Libertarian primary ===
==== Candidates ====
===== Nominee =====
- Eric Eberly and nominee for this seat in 2012

==== Primary results ====
Libertarian primary results
Party	Candidate	Votes	%
Libertarian	Eric Eberly	395	100.0

=== General election ===
==== Endorsements ====
Bob Latta (R)

Organizations

- National Federation of Independent Business
- National Rifle Association - Political Victory Fund
- National Right to Life Committee

Newspapers

- Toledo Blade
Robert Fry (D)

Labor unions

- AFL-CIO
- International Brotherhood of Boilermakers
- Sheet Metal Workers' International Association

==== Predictions ====
Source	Ranking	As of
The Cook Political Report	Safe R	November 3, 2014
Rothenberg	Safe R	October 24, 2014
Sabato's Crystal Ball	Safe R	October 30, 2014
RCP	Safe R	November 2, 2014
Daily Kos Elections	Safe R	November 4, 2014

==== Results ====
Ohio's 5th congressional district, 2014
Party	Candidate	Votes	%
Republican	Bob Latta (incumbent)	134,449	66.5
Democratic	Robert Fry	58,507	28.9
Libertarian	Eric Eberly	9,344	4.6
Total votes		202,300	100.0
Republican hold			

== District 6 ==
2014 Ohio's 6th congressional district election
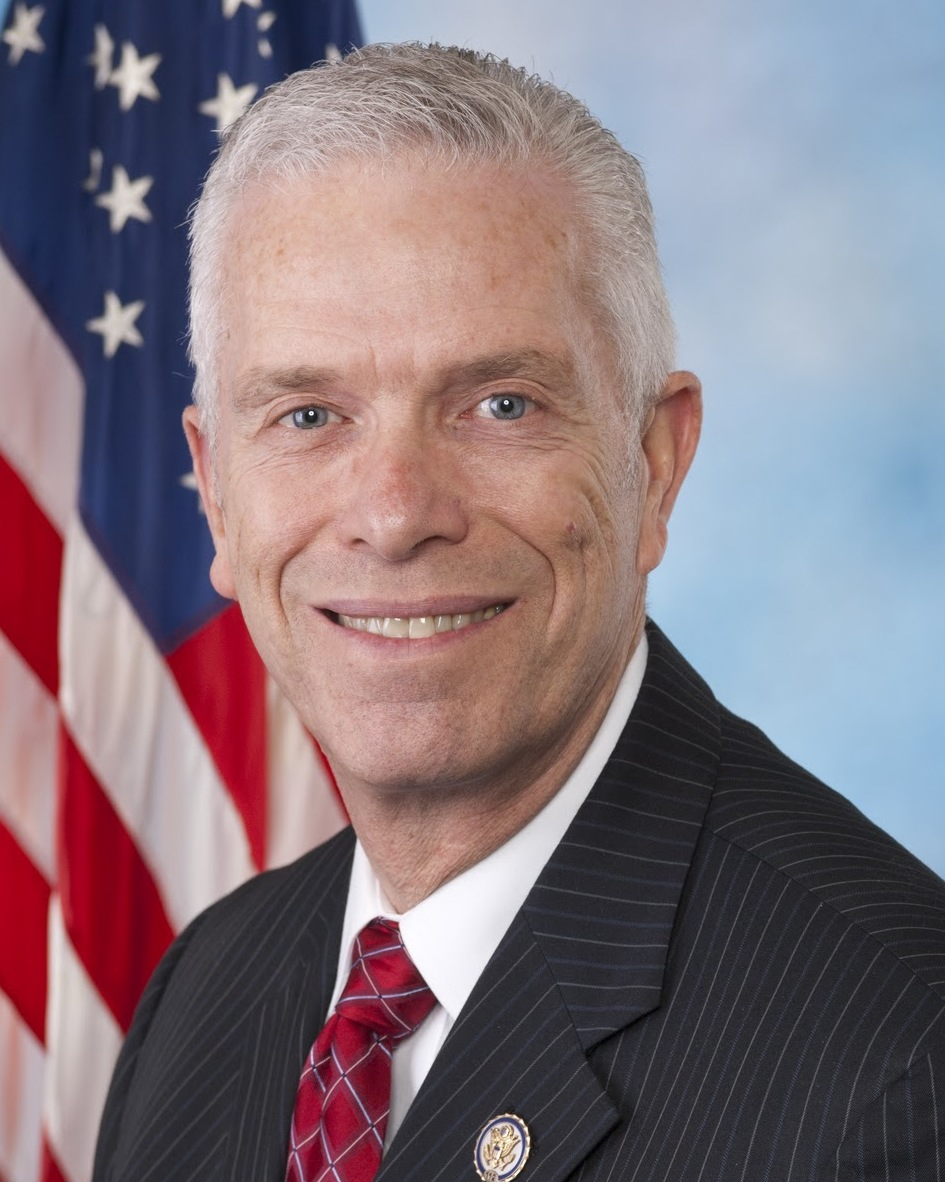

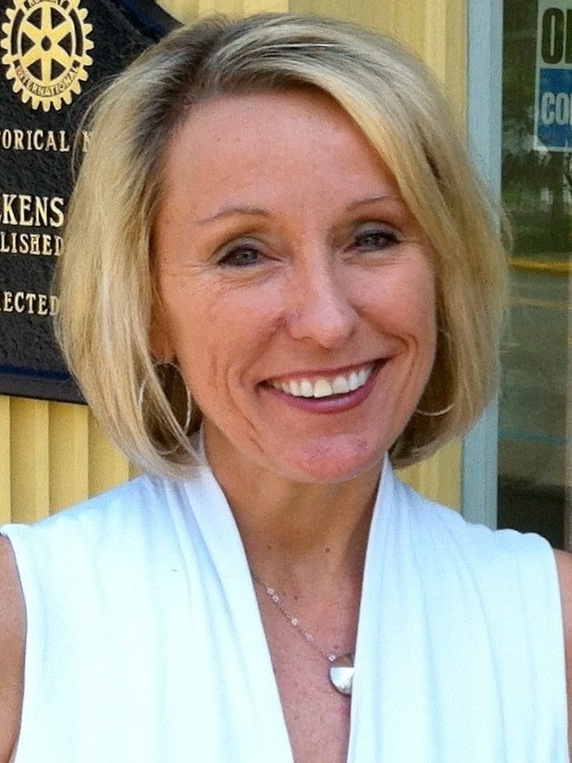
Nominee	Bill Johnson	Jennifer Garrison
Party	Republican	Democratic
Popular vote	111,026	73,561
Percentage	58.2%	38.6%
- County results Johnson: 50–60% 60–70% Garrison: 50–60%
U.S. Representative before election
Bill Johnson
Republican
Elected U.S. Representative
Bill Johnson
Republican

The 6th district encompasses Appalachian Ohio, including Steubenville, Marietta, and Ironton. It had been represented by Bill Johnson since 2011.

=== Republican primary ===
==== Candidates ====
===== Nominee =====
- Bill Johnson, incumbent U.S. Representative

==== Primary results ====
Republican primary results
Party	Candidate	Votes	%
Republican	Bill Johnson (Incumbent)	30,799	100.0

=== Democratic primary ===
==== Candidates ====
===== Nominee =====
- Jennifer Garrison, former state representative

===== Eliminated in primary =====
- Gregory Howard

===== Declined =====
- Lou Gentile, state senator
- Anthony Traficanti, Mahoning County Commissioner

==== Primary results ====
Democratic primary results
Party	Candidate	Votes	%
Democratic	Jennifer Garrison	22,359	73.0
Democratic	Gregory D. Howard	8,292	27.0
Total votes		30,651	100.0

=== Green primary ===
==== Candidates ====
===== Nominee =====
- Dennis Lambert

==== Primary results ====
Green primary results
Party	Candidate	Votes	%
Green	Dennis Lambert	29	100.0

=== General election ===
==== Endorsements ====
Bill Johnson (R)

Labor unions

- International Union of Operating Engineers
- National Association of Letter Carriers

Organizations

- National Federation of Independent Business
- National Rifle Association - Political Victory Fund
- National Right to Life Committee

Newspapers

- Youngstown Vindicator
Jennifer Garrison (D)

State legislators

- Jack Cera, state representative
- Lou Gentile, state senator
- Debbie Phillips, state representative
- Joe Schiavoni, state senator

Local officials

- Anthony Traficanti, Mahoning County Commissioner

Labor unions

- AFL-CIO
- American Federation of State, County and Municipal Employees
- American Federation of Teachers
- International Association of Sheet Metal, Air, Rail and Transportation Workers
- International Brotherhood of Boilermakers
- International Brotherhood of Electrical Workers
- International Union of Painters and Allied Trades
- Sheet Metal Workers' International Association
- United Auto Workers
- United Steelworkers
- United Transportation Union
- Utility Workers Union of America

Organizations

- Blue Dog Coalition

==== Debate ====
2014 Ohio's 6th congressional district debate
No.	Date	Host	Moderator	Link	Republican	Democratic	Green
Key: P Participant A Absent N Not invited I Invited W Withdrawn							
Key: P Participant A Absent N Not invited I Invited W Withdrawn					Bill Johnson	Jennifer Garrison	Dennis Lambert
1	Sep. 30, 2014		Susanne Walker		P	P	P

==== Predictions ====
Source	Ranking	As of
The Cook Political Report	Safe R	November 3, 2014
Rothenberg	Safe R	October 24, 2014
Sabato's Crystal Ball	Safe R	October 30, 2014
RCP	Likely R	November 2, 2014
Daily Kos Elections	Safe R	November 4, 2014

==== Results ====
Ohio's 6th congressional district, 2014
Party	Candidate	Votes	%
Republican	Bill Johnson (incumbent)	111,026	58.2
Democratic	Jennifer Garrison	73,561	38.6
Green	Dennis Lambert	6,065	3.2
Total votes		190,652	100.0
Republican hold			

== District 7 ==
2014 Ohio's 7th congressional district election
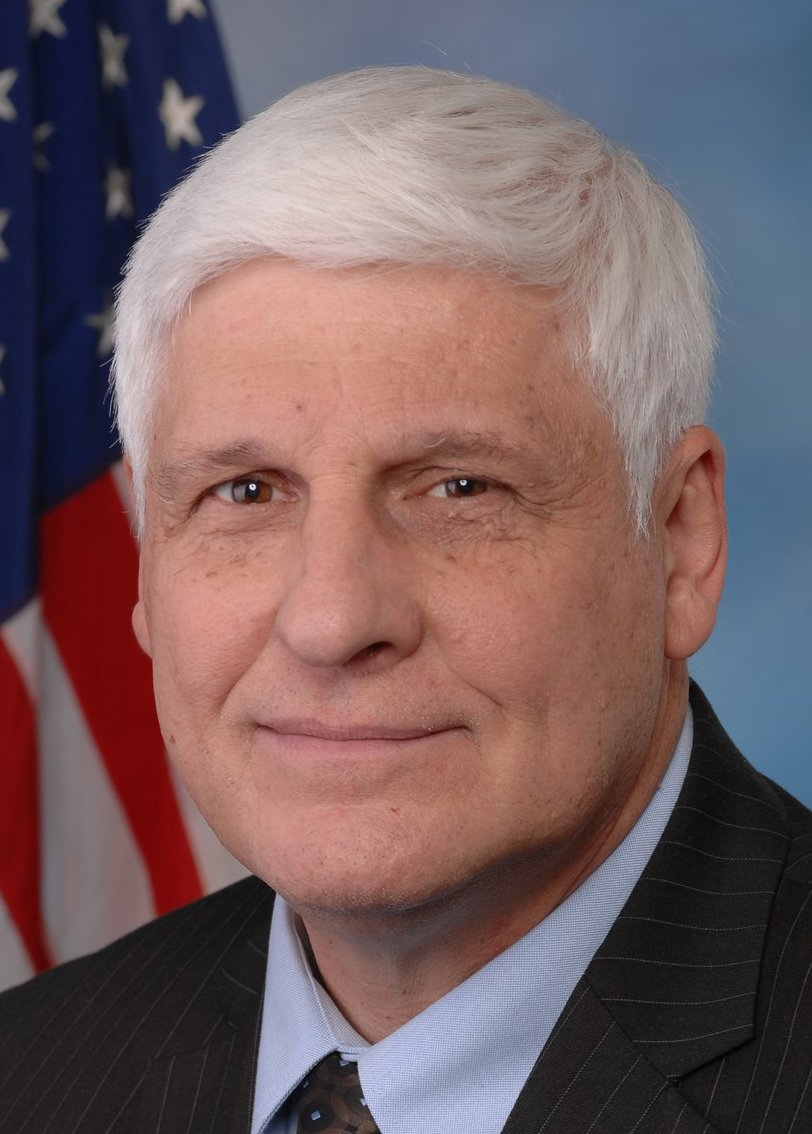
Nominee	Bob Gibbs
Party	Republican
Popular vote	143,959
Percentage	100.0%
U.S. Representative before election
Bob Gibbs
Republican
Elected U.S. Representative
Bob Gibbs
Republican

The 7th district is based in northeastern Ohio, and includes the city of Canton. It had been represented by Republican Bob Gibbs since 2011.

=== Republican primary ===
==== Candidates ====
===== Nominee =====
- Bob Gibbs, incumbent U.S. Representative

==== Primary results ====
Republican primary results
Party	Candidate	Votes	%
Republican	Bob Gibbs (incumbent)	32,839	100.0

=== Democratic primary ===
Former Democratic representative John Boccieri (who served in Ohio's 16th congressional district for a single term, from 2009 through 2011, and was defeated in his bid for reelection in the 2010 elections by Republican Jim Renacci) filed paperwork to run in the 7th district in January 2013, but put his plans on hold, to potentially run in another district or not at all. Ultimately he did not run for any seat.

==== Candidates ====
===== Declined =====
- John Boccieri, former U.S. Representative

=== General election ===
==== Endorsements ====
Bob Gibbs (R)

Organizations

- National Federation of Independent Business
- National Rifle Association - Political Victory Fund
- National Right to Life Committee

==== Predictions ====
Source	Ranking	As of
The Cook Political Report	Safe R	November 3, 2014
Rothenberg	Safe R	October 24, 2014
Sabato's Crystal Ball	Safe R	October 30, 2014
RCP	Safe R	November 2, 2014
Daily Kos Elections	Safe R	November 4, 2014

==== Results ====
Ohio's 7th congressional district, 2014
Party	Candidate	Votes	%
Republican	Bob Gibbs (incumbent)	143,959	100.0
Total votes		143,959	100.0
Republican hold			

== District 8 ==
2014 Ohio's 8th congressional district election
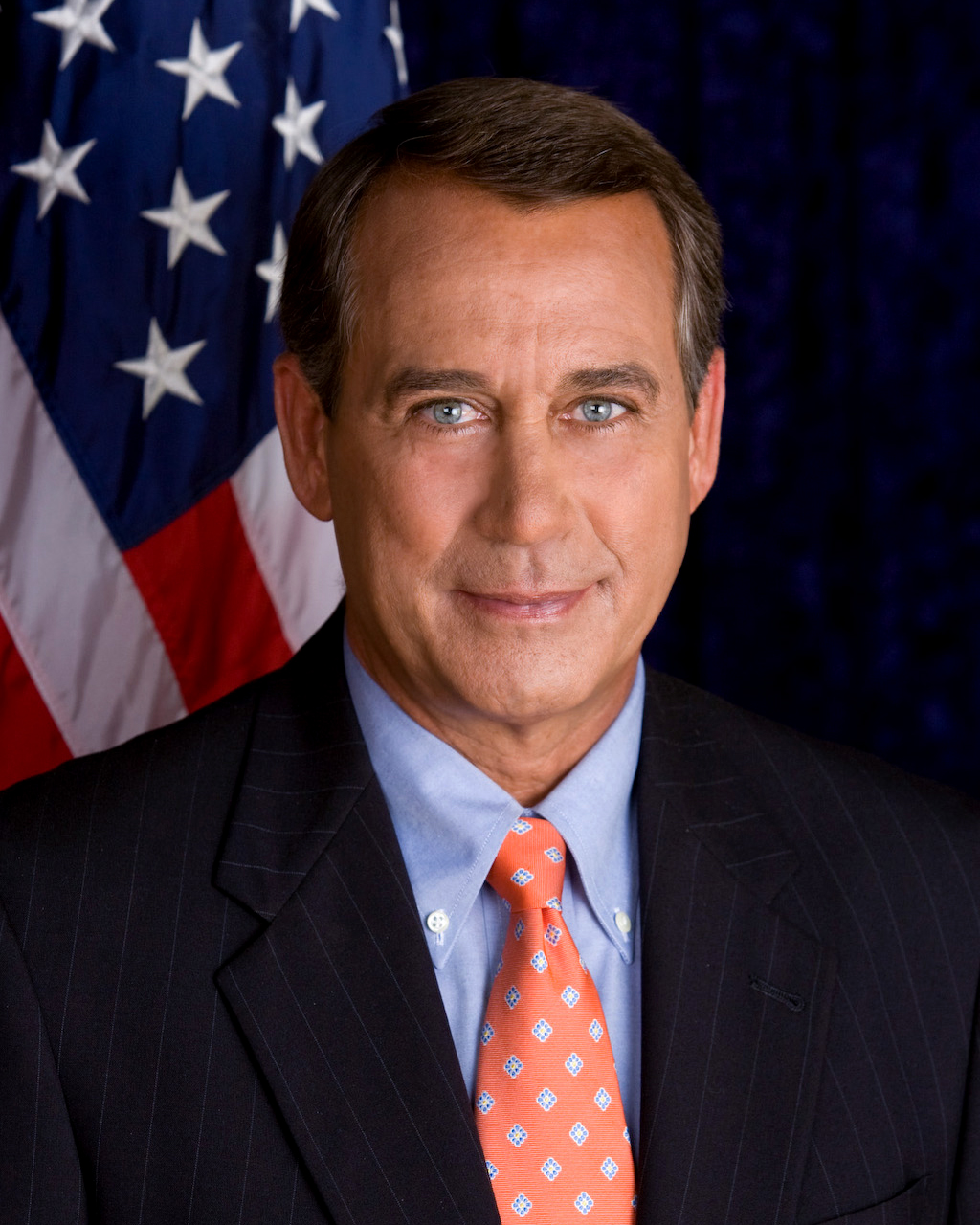

Nominee	John Boehner	Tom Poetter
Party	Republican	Democratic
Popular vote	126,539	51,534
Percentage	67.2%	27.4%
- County results Boehner: 60–70% 70–80% 80–90%
U.S. Representative before election
John Boehner
Republican
Elected U.S. Representative
John Boehner
Republican

The 8th district takes in the northern suburbs of Cincinnati, including Butler County, as well as taking in Springfield. Republican John Boehner, the Speaker of the House, had represented Ohio's 8th congressional district since 1991. This was Boehner's last election to this seat, as he would resign from office on October 31, 2015.

=== Republican primary ===
Though Republican aides believed Boehner would step down as House speaker in 2014, he had insisted that he would run for reelection to the House and as Speaker. Boehner faced primary challenges from two conservatives, Eric Gurr and J.D. Winteregg.

==== Candidates ====
===== Nominee =====
- John Boehner, incumbent U.S. Representative

===== Eliminated in primary =====
- Eric Gurr, computer consultant
- J.D. Winteregg, high school teacher and Tea Party member

==== Primary results ====
Republican primary results
Party	Candidate	Votes	%
Republican	John Boehner (incumbent)	47,261	71.5
Republican	J.D. Winteregg	15,030	22.7
Republican	Eric Gurr	3,812	5.8
Total votes		65,658	100.0

=== Democratic primary ===
==== Candidates ====
===== Nominee =====
- Tom Poetter, professor at Miami University

===== Eliminated in primary =====
- Matthew Guyette

==== Primary results ====
Democratic primary results
Party	Candidate	Votes	%
Democratic	Tom Poetter	8,911	54.6
Democratic	Matthew J. Guyette	7,399	45.4
Total votes		16,310	100.0

=== Constitution primary ===
==== Candidates ====
===== Nominee =====
- Jim Condit, Jr

==== Primary results ====
Constitution primary results
Party	Candidate	Votes	%
Constitution	James J. Condit, Jr.	60	100.0

=== General election ===
==== Endorsements ====
John Boehner (R)

Organizations

- National Federation of Independent Business
- National Rifle Association - Political Victory Fund
- National Right to Life Committee
Tom Poetter (D)

Labor unions

- AFL-CIO
- International Brotherhood of Boilermakers

==== Predictions ====
Source	Ranking	As of
The Cook Political Report	Safe R	November 3, 2014
Rothenberg	Safe R	October 24, 2014
Sabato's Crystal Ball	Safe R	October 30, 2014
RCP	Safe R	November 2, 2014
Daily Kos Elections	Safe R	November 4, 2014

==== Results ====
Ohio's 8th congressional district, 2014
Party	Candidate	Votes	%
Republican	John Boehner (incumbent)	126,539	67.2
Democratic	Tom Poetter	51,534	27.4
Constitution	James J. Condit, Jr.	10,257	5.4
Total votes		188,330	100.0
Republican hold			

== District 9 ==
2014 Ohio's 9th congressional district election
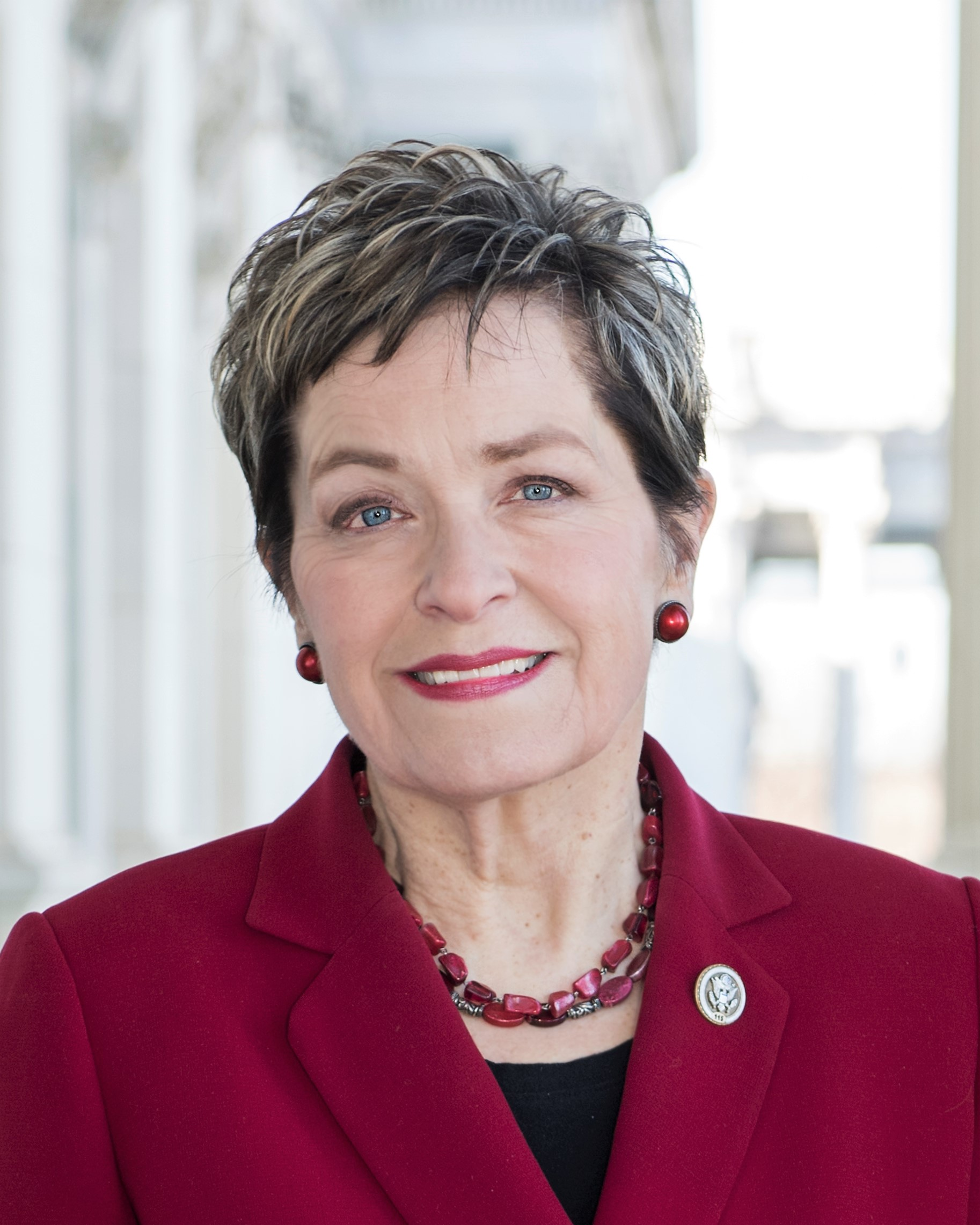

Nominee	Marcy Kaptur	Richard May
Party	Democratic	Republican
Popular vote	108,870	51,704
Percentage	67.7%	32.2%
- County results Kaptur: 50–60% 60–70% 70–80%
U.S. Representative before election
Marcy Kaptur
Democratic
Elected U.S. Representative
Marcy Kaptur
Democratic

The 9th district spans the coast of Lake Erie from Toledo to the west side of Cleveland, taking in Port Clinton, Sandusky, Lorain, Lakewood, Brook Park, and Brooklyn. Marcy Kaptur had represented Ohio's 9th congressional district since 1983.

=== Democratic primary ===
==== Candidates ====
===== Nominee =====
- Marcy Kaptur, incumbent U.S. Representative

===== Declined =====
- Isaac Quiñones II, former campaign aide

==== Primary results ====
Democratic primary results
Party	Candidate	Votes	%
Democratic	Marcy Kaptur (incumbent)	32,464	100.0

=== Republican primary ===
==== Candidates ====
===== Nominee =====
- Richard May

===== Eliminated in primary =====
- Robert C. Horrocks Jr.

==== Primary results ====
Republican primary results
Party	Candidate	Votes	%
Republican	Richard May	9,587	72.2
Republican	Robert C. Horrocks, Jr.	3,686	27.8
Total votes		13,273	100.0

=== General election ===
==== Endorsements ====
Marcy Kaptur (D)

Labor unions

- AFL-CIO
- International Brotherhood of Boilermakers
- National Association of Letter Carriers

Organizations

- Human Rights Campaign
- Sierra Club

Newspapers

- Cleveland Plain Dealer
- Toledo Blade

==== Predictions ====
Source	Ranking	As of
The Cook Political Report	Safe D	November 3, 2014
Rothenberg	Safe D	October 24, 2014
Sabato's Crystal Ball	Safe D	October 30, 2014
RCP	Safe D	November 2, 2014
Daily Kos Elections	Safe D	November 4, 2014

==== Results ====
Ohio's 9th congressional district, 2014
Party	Candidate	Votes	%
Democratic	Marcy Kaptur (incumbent)	108,870	67.7
Republican	Richard May	51,704	32.2
Independent	Cory Hoffman (write-in)	112	0.1
Independent	George A. Skalsky (write-in)	29	0.0
Total votes		160,715	100.0
Democratic hold			

== District 10 ==
2014 Ohio's 10th congressional district election
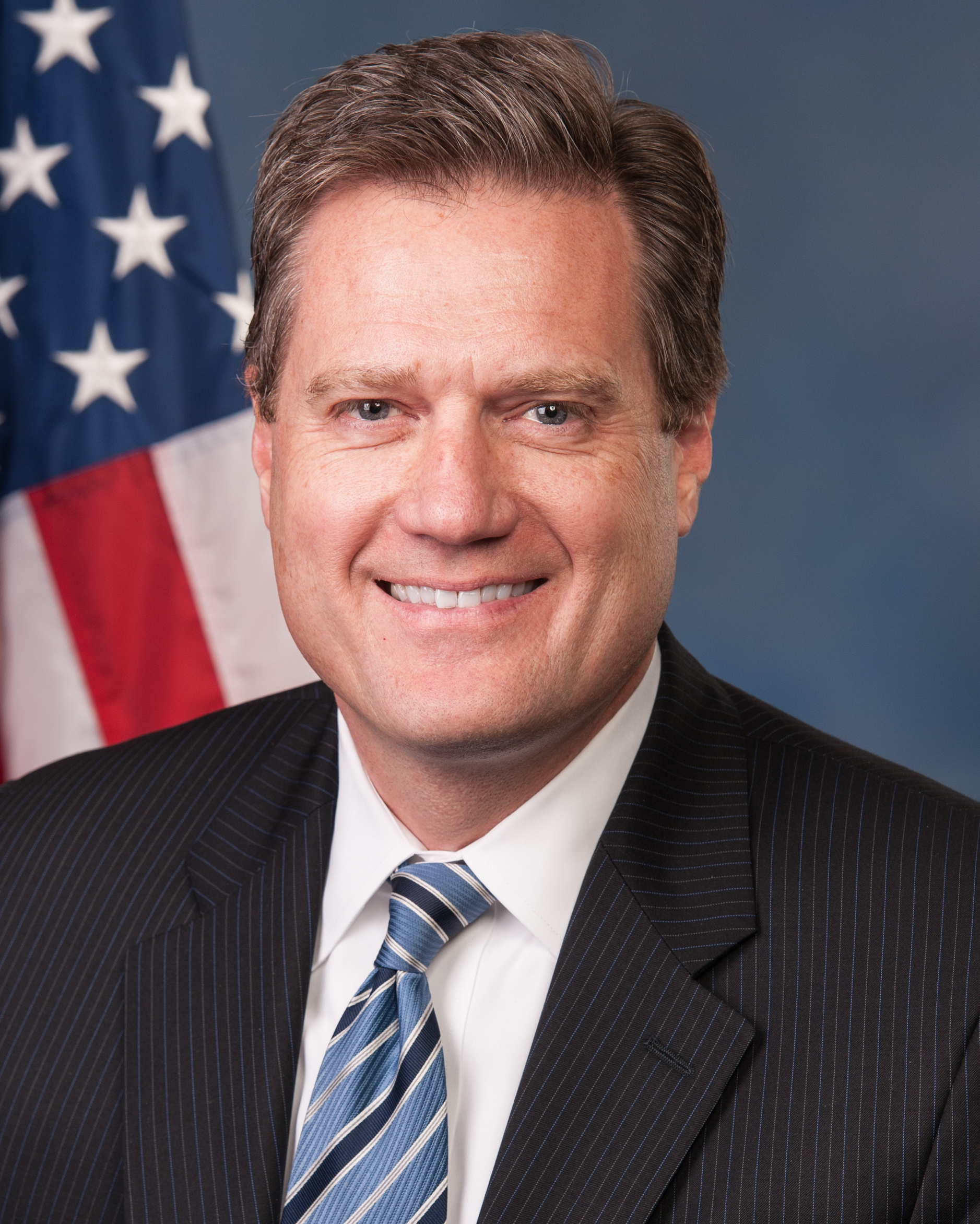

Nominee	Mike Turner	Robert Klepinger
Party	Republican	Democratic
Popular vote	130,752	63,249
Percentage	65.2%	31.5%
- County results Turner: 60–70% 70–80%
U.S. Representative before election
Mike Turner
Republican
Elected U.S. Representative
Mike Turner
Republican

The 10th district encompasses the Dayton metro area, including Dayton and the surrounding suburbs. It had been held by Republican Congressman Mike Turner since 2003.

=== Republican primary ===
==== Candidates ====
===== Nominee =====
- Mike Turner, incumbent U.S. Representative

===== Eliminated in primary =====
- John D. Anderson, civilian air force acquisition logistics and sustainment manager and candidate for this seat in 2012

==== Primary results ====
Republican primary results
Party	Candidate	Votes	%
Republican	Mike Turner (incumbent)	32,550	79.9
Republican	John D. Anderson	8,214	20.1
Total votes		40,764	100.0

=== Democratic primary ===
==== Candidates ====
===== Nominee =====
- Robert Klepinger

===== Eliminated in primary =====
- Bill Conner, programmer and Air Force veteran

===== Withdrawn =====
- Russ Gottesman

==== Primary results ====
Democratic primary results
Party	Candidate	Votes	%
Democratic	Robert Klepinger	9,645	55.8
Democratic	Bill Conner	7,655	44.2
Total votes		17,300	100.0

=== Libertarian primary ===
==== Candidates ====
===== Nominee =====
- David Harlow

==== Primary results ====
Libertarian primary results
Party	Candidate	Votes	%
Libertarian	David A. Harlow	221	100.0

=== General election ===
==== Endorsements ====
Mike Turner (R)

Organizations

- National Federation of Independent Business
- National Rifle Association - Political Victory Fund
- National Right to Life Committee

==== Predictions ====
Source	Ranking	As of
The Cook Political Report	Safe R	November 3, 2014
Rothenberg	Safe R	October 24, 2014
Sabato's Crystal Ball	Safe R	October 30, 2014
RCP	Safe R	November 2, 2014
Daily Kos Elections	Safe R	November 4, 2014

==== Results ====
Ohio's 10th congressional district, 2014
Party	Candidate	Votes	%
Republican	Mike Turner (incumbent)	130,752	65.2
Democratic	Robert Klepinger	63,249	31.5
Libertarian	David A. Harlow	6,605	3.3
Total votes		200,606	100.0
Republican hold			

== District 11 ==
2014 Ohio's 11th congressional district election
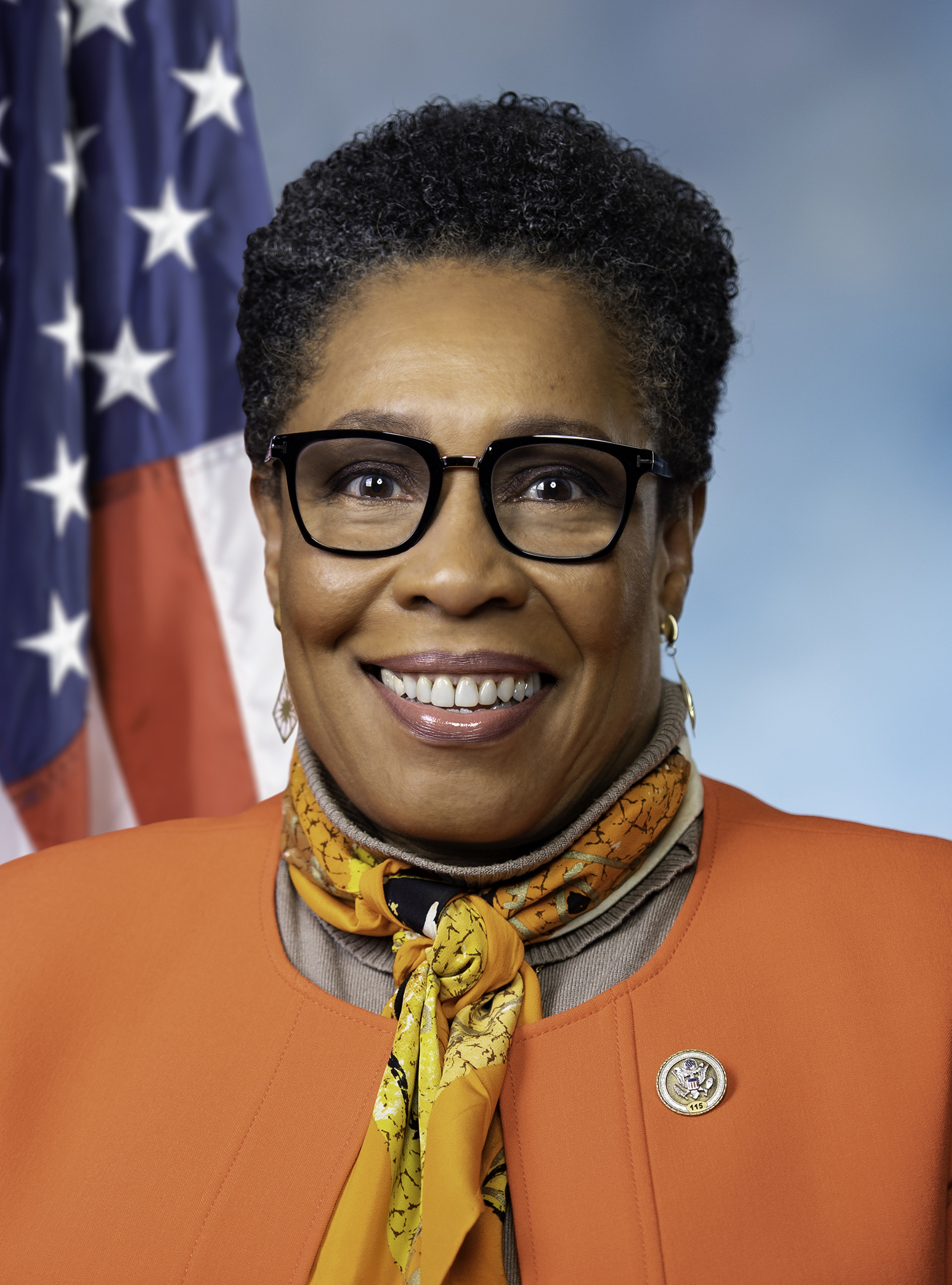

Nominee	Marcia Fudge	Mark Zetzer
Party	Democratic	Republican
Popular vote	137,105	35,461
Percentage	79.5%	20.5%
- County results Fudge: 60–70% 80–90%
U.S. Representative before election
Marcia Fudge
Democratic
Elected U.S. Representative
Marcia Fudge
Democratic

The 11th district takes in eastern Cleveland and its suburbs, including Euclid, Cleveland Heights, and Warrensville Heights, as well as stretching southward into Richfield and parts of Akron. It had been represented by Democrat Marcia Fudge since 2008.

=== Democratic primary ===
==== Candidates ====
===== Nominee =====
- Marcia Fudge, incumbent U.S. Representative

==== Primary results ====
Democratic primary results
Party	Candidate	Votes	%
Democratic	Marcia Fudge (incumbent)	55,088	100.0

=== Republican primary ===
==== Candidates ====
===== Nominee =====
- Mark Zetzer

==== Primary results ====
Republican primary results
Party	Candidate	Votes	%
Republican	Mark Zetzer	8,839	100.0

=== General election ===
==== Endorsements ====
Marcia Fudge (D)

Labor unions

- AFL-CIO
- International Brotherhood of Boilermakers
- National Association of Letter Carriers

Organizations

- Human Rights Campaign
- National Organization for Women
- Sierra Club

Newspapers

- Cleveland Plain Dealer
Mark Zetzer (R)

Organizations

- Republican Liberty Caucus

==== Predictions ====
Source	Ranking	As of
The Cook Political Report	Safe D	November 3, 2014
Rothenberg	Safe D	October 24, 2014
Sabato's Crystal Ball	Safe D	October 30, 2014
RCP	Safe D	November 2, 2014
Daily Kos Elections	Safe D	November 4, 2014

==== Results ====
Ohio's 11th congressional district, 2014
Party	Candidate	Votes	%
Democratic	Marcia Fudge (incumbent)	137,105	79.5
Republican	Mark Zetzer	35,461	20.5
Total votes		172,566	100.0
Democratic hold			

== District 12 ==
2014 Ohio's 12th congressional district election
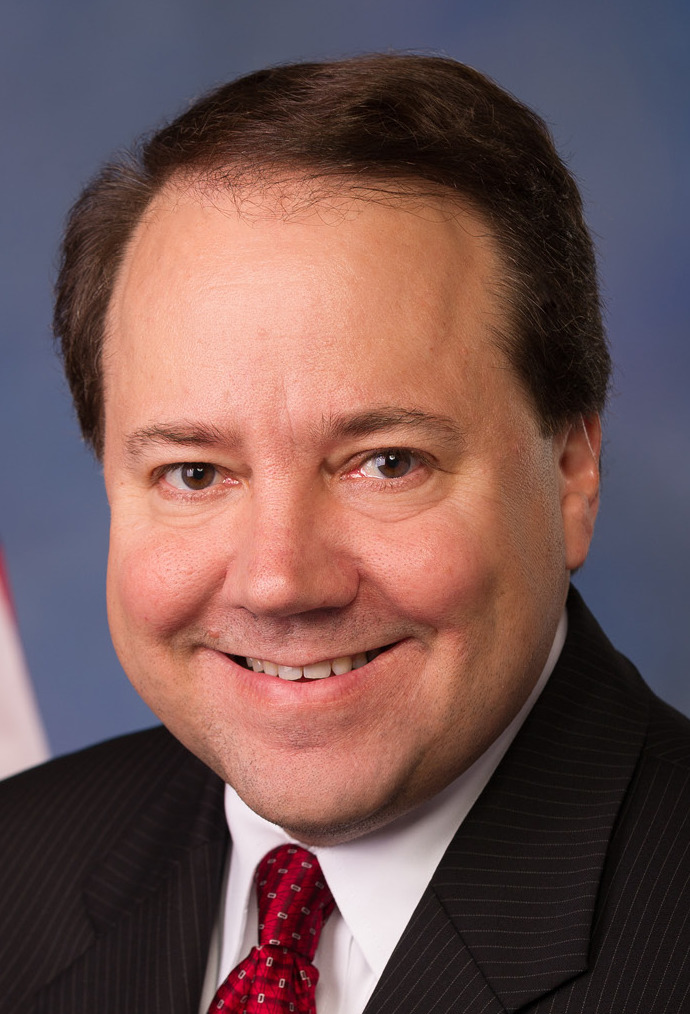

Nominee	Pat Tiberi	David Arthur Tibbs
Party	Republican	Democratic
Popular vote	150,573	61,360
Percentage	68.1%	27.8%
- County results Tiberi: 60–70% 70–80%
U.S. Representative before election
Pat Tiberi
Republican
Elected U.S. Representative
Pat Tiberi
Republican

The 12th district encompasses the northern Columbus metro area, taking in the northern Columbus suburbs, including Dublin, Westerville, Gahanna, and New Albany, as well as Newark, Mansfield, and Zanesville. It had been held by Republican Congressman Pat Tiberi since 2001.

=== Republican primary ===
==== Candidates ====
===== Nominee =====
- Pat Tiberi, incumbent U.S. Representative

==== Primary results ====
Republican primary results
Party	Candidate	Votes	%
Republican	Pat Tiberi (incumbent)	46,186	100.0

=== Democratic primary ===
==== Candidates ====
===== Nominee =====
- David Tibbs, Army veteran

==== Primary results ====
Democratic primary results
Party	Candidate	Votes	%
Democratic	David Arthur Tibbs	18,259	100.0

=== Green primary ===
==== Candidates ====
===== Nominee =====
- Bob Hart

==== Primary results ====
Green primary results
Party	Candidate	Votes	%
Green	Bob Hart	155	100.0

=== General election ===
==== Endorsements ====
Pat Tiberi (R)

Organizations

- National Federation of Independent Business
- National Rifle Association - Political Victory Fund
- National Right to Life Committee

==== Predictions ====
Source	Ranking	As of
The Cook Political Report	Safe R	November 3, 2014
Rothenberg	Safe R	October 24, 2014
Sabato's Crystal Ball	Safe R	October 30, 2014
RCP	Safe R	November 2, 2014
Daily Kos Elections	Safe R	November 4, 2014

==== Results ====
Ohio's 12th congressional district, 2014
Party	Candidate	Votes	%
Republican	Pat Tiberi (incumbent)	150,573	68.1
Democratic	David Arthur Tibbs	61,360	27.8
Green	Bob Hart	9,148	4.1
Total votes		221,081	100.0
Republican hold			

== District 13 ==
2014 Ohio's 13th congressional district election
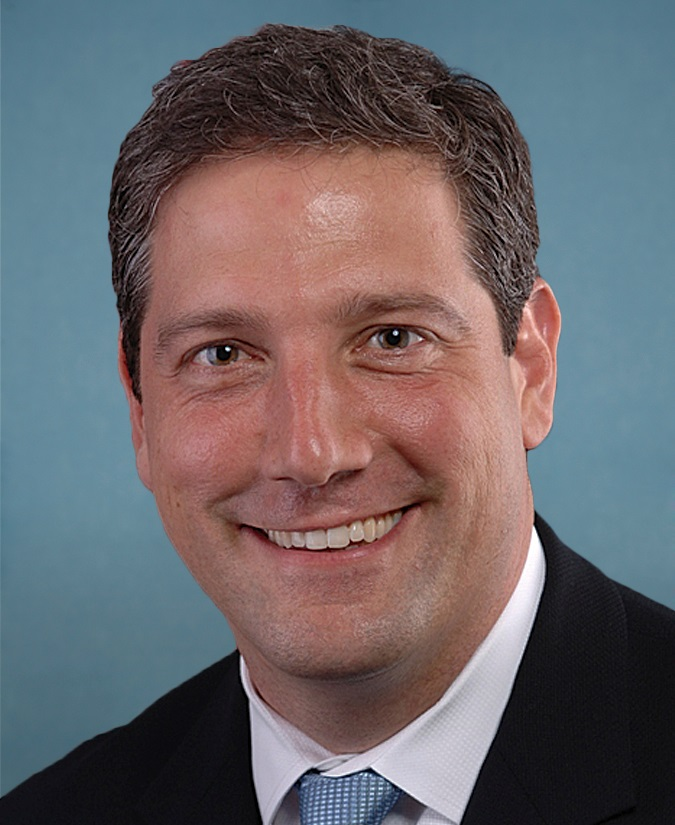

Nominee	Tim Ryan	Thomas Pekarek
Party	Democratic	Republican
Popular vote	120,230	55,233
Percentage	68.5%	31.5%
- County results Ryan: 50–60% 60–70% 70–80%
U.S. Representative before election
Tim Ryan
Democratic
Elected U.S. Representative
Tim Ryan
Democratic

The 13th district covers the Mahoning Valley in northeastern Ohio, including Youngstown and eastern parts of Akron. Democrat Tim Ryan was running for reelection.

=== Democratic primary ===
==== Candidates ====
===== Nominee =====
- Tim Ryan, incumbent U.S. Representative

===== Eliminated in primary =====
- John Stephen Luchansky

==== Primary results ====
Democratic primary results
Party	Candidate	Votes	%
Democratic	Tim Ryan (incumbent)	45,585	85.1
Democratic	John Stephen Luchansky	8,016	14.9
Total votes		53,601	100.0

=== Republican primary ===
==== Candidates ====
===== Nominee =====
- Thomas Pekarek

==== Primary results ====
Republican primary results
Party	Candidate	Votes	%
Republican	Thomas Pekarek	351	100.0

=== General election ===
==== Endorsements ====
Tim Ryan (D)

Labor unions

- AFL-CIO
- International Brotherhood of Boilermakers
- National Association of Letter Carriers

Organizations

- Human Rights Campaign

Newspapers

- Cleveland Plain Dealer

==== Predictions ====
Source	Ranking	As of
The Cook Political Report	Safe D	November 3, 2014
Rothenberg	Safe D	October 24, 2014
Sabato's Crystal Ball	Safe D	October 30, 2014
RCP	Safe D	November 2, 2014
Daily Kos Elections	Safe D	November 4, 2014

==== Results ====
Ohio's 13th congressional district, 2014
Party	Candidate	Votes	%
Democratic	Tim Ryan (incumbent)	120,230	68.5
Republican	Thomas Pekarek	55,233	31.5
Independent	David Allen Pastorius (write-in)	86	0.0
Total votes		175,549	100.0
Democratic hold			

== District 14 ==
2014 Ohio's 14th congressional district election
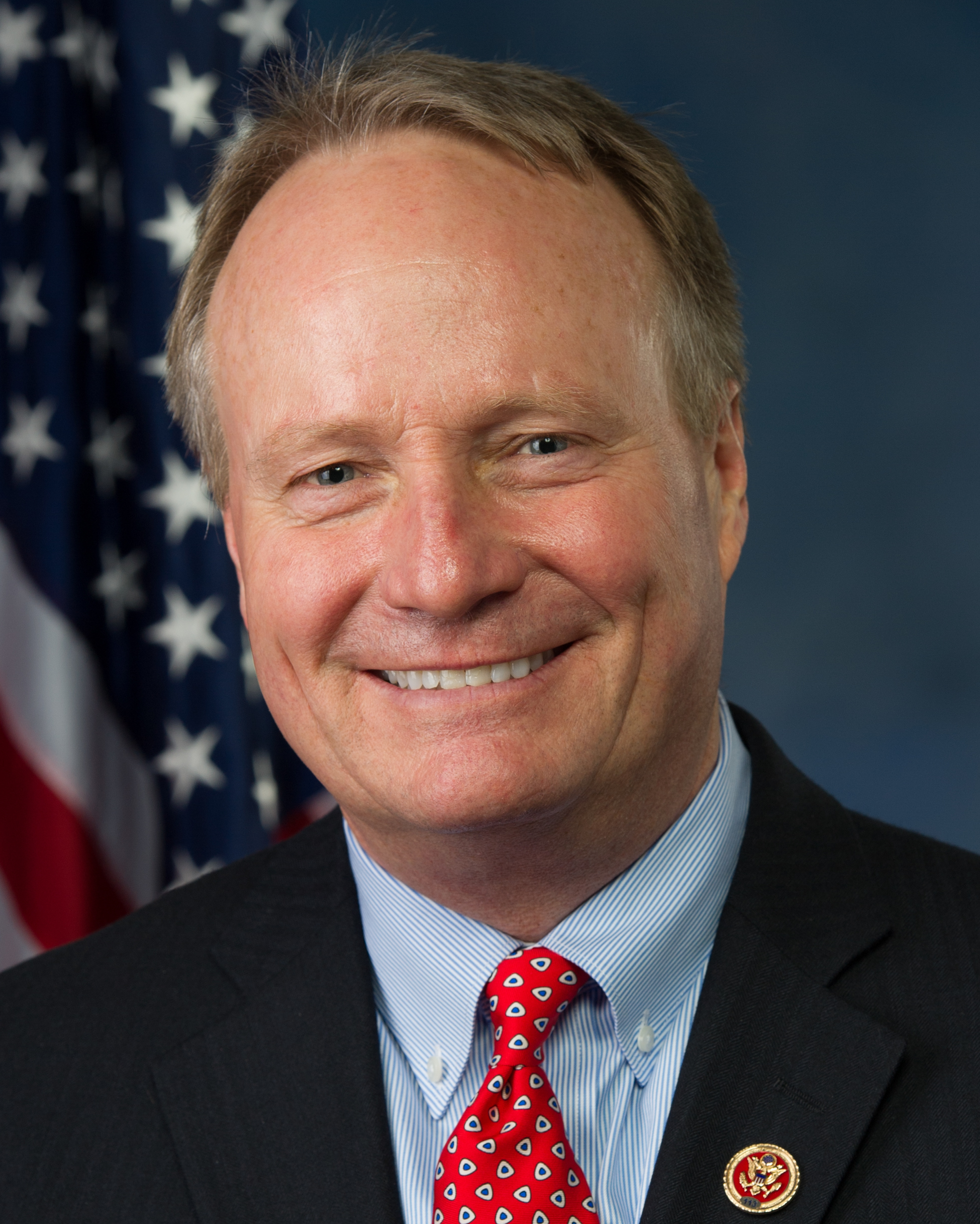

Nominee	David Joyce	Michael Wager
Party	Republican	Democratic
Popular vote	135,736	70,856
Percentage	63.3%	33.0%
- County results Joyce: 50–60% 60–70% 70–80%
U.S. Representative before election
David Joyce
Republican
Elected U.S. Representative
David Joyce
Republican

The 14th district is located in Northeast Ohio, taking in the eastern suburbs and exurbs of Cleveland, including Mayfield Heights, Solon, and Independence, as well as Ashtabula, Lake, and Geauga counties, northern Portage County, and northeastern Summit County. Republican representative David Joyce had represented the 14th district since January 2013.

=== Republican primary ===
Joyce was challenged in the Republican primary by State Representative Matt Lynch. Joyce, who had been called "Ohio's most vulnerable House Republican", did not win a primary election for the seat in 2012 after incumbent Republican Steve LaTourette retired months after winning the primary unopposed, leading local party leaders to pick Joyce to replace him.

==== Candidates ====
===== Nominee =====
- David Joyce, incumbent U.S. Representative

===== Eliminated in primary =====
- Matt Lynch, state representative

==== Primary results ====
Republican primary results
Party	Candidate	Votes	%
Republican	David Joyce (incumbent)	27,547	55.0
Republican	Matt Lynch	22,546	45.0
Total votes		50,093	100.0

=== Democratic primary ===
==== Candidates ====
===== Nominee =====
- Michael Wager, attorney

==== Primary results ====
Democratic primary results
Party	Candidate	Votes	%
Democratic	Michael Wager	23,533	100.0

==== Candidates ====
===== Nominee =====
- David Macko

==== Primary results ====
Libertarian primary results
Party	Candidate	Votes	%
Libertarian	David Macko	259	100.0

=== General election ===
==== Endorsements ====
David Joyce (R)

Labor unions

- National Association of Letter Carriers

Organizations

- National Federation of Independent Business
- National Rifle Association - Political Victory Fund
- National Right to Life Committee

Newspapers

- Cleveland Plain Dealer
Michael Wager (D)

U.S Senators

- Sherrod Brown, U.S. Senator (2007–present)

Labor unions

- AFL-CIO
- American Federation of State, County and Municipal Employees

Organizations

- Alliance for Retired Americans

Newspapers

- The Akron Beacon-Journal

==== Debate ====
2014 Ohio's 14th congressional district debate
No.	Date	Host	Moderator	Link	Republican	Democratic	Libertarian
Key: P Participant A Absent N Not invited I Invited W Withdrawn							
Key: P Participant A Absent N Not invited I Invited W Withdrawn					David Joyce	Michael Wager	David Macko
1	Oct. 13, 2014	City Club of Cleveland	Dan Moulthrop		P	P	P

==== Predictions ====
Source	Ranking	As of
The Cook Political Report	Safe R	November 3, 2014
Rothenberg	Safe R	October 24, 2014
Sabato's Crystal Ball	Safe R	October 30, 2014
RCP	Likely R	November 2, 2014
Daily Kos Elections	Safe R	November 4, 2014

==== Results ====
Ohio's 14th congressional district, 2014
Party	Candidate	Votes	%
Republican	David Joyce (incumbent)	135,736	63.3
Democratic	Michael Wager	70,856	33.0
Libertarian	David Macko	7,988	3.7
Total votes		214,580	100.0
Republican hold			

== District 15 ==
2014 Ohio's 15th congressional district election
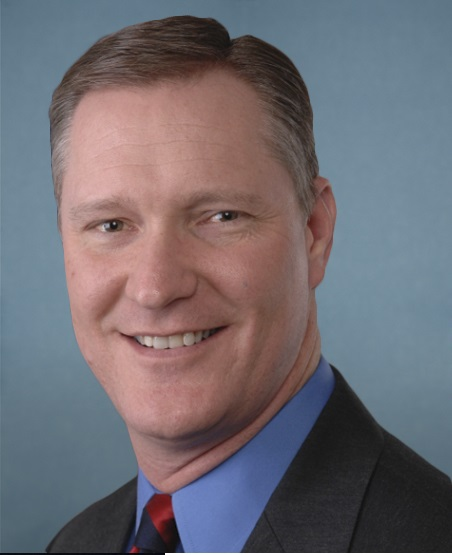

Nominee	Steve Stivers	Scott Wharton
Party	Republican	Democratic
Popular vote	128,496	66,125
Percentage	66.0%	34.0%
- County results Stivers: 60–70% 70–80% 80–90% Wharton: 60–70%
U.S. Representative before election
Steve Stivers
Republican
Elected U.S. Representative
Steve Stivers
Republican

The 15th district encompasses the southern Columbus metro area, taking in the western and eastern suburbs of Columbus, including Upper Arlington, Hilliard, and Grove City, as well as Athens. It had been held by Republican Steve Stivers since 2011.

=== Republican primary ===
==== Candidates ====
===== Nominee =====
- Steve Stivers, incumbent U.S. Representative

==== Primary results ====
Republican primary results
Party	Candidate	Votes	%
Republican	Steve Stivers (incumbent)	36,569	90.1
Republican	Charles S. Chope	3,999	9.9
Total votes		40,568	100.0

=== Democratic primary ===
==== Candidates ====
===== Nominee =====
- Scott Wharton farmer, airline pilot and candidate for this seat in 2012

==== Primary results ====
Democratic primary results
Party	Candidate	Votes	%
Democratic	Scott Wharton	18,336	100.0

=== General election ===
==== Endorsements ====
Scott Wharton (D)

U.S Senators

- Sherrod Brown, U.S. Senator (2007–present)

Labor unions

- AFL-CIO
- American Federation of State, County and Municipal Employees
- International Brotherhood of Boilermakers

Organizations

- Alliance for Retired Americans
- National Organization for Women

==== Predictions ====
Source	Ranking	As of
The Cook Political Report	Safe R	November 3, 2014
Rothenberg	Safe R	October 24, 2014
Sabato's Crystal Ball	Safe R	October 30, 2014
RCP	Safe R	November 2, 2014
Daily Kos Elections	Safe R	November 4, 2014

==== Results ====
Ohio's 15th congressional district, 2014
Party	Candidate	Votes	%
Republican	Steve Stivers (incumbent)	128,496	66.0
Democratic	Scott Wharton	66,125	34.0
Total votes		194,621	100.0
Republican hold			

== District 16 ==
2014 Ohio's 16th congressional district election
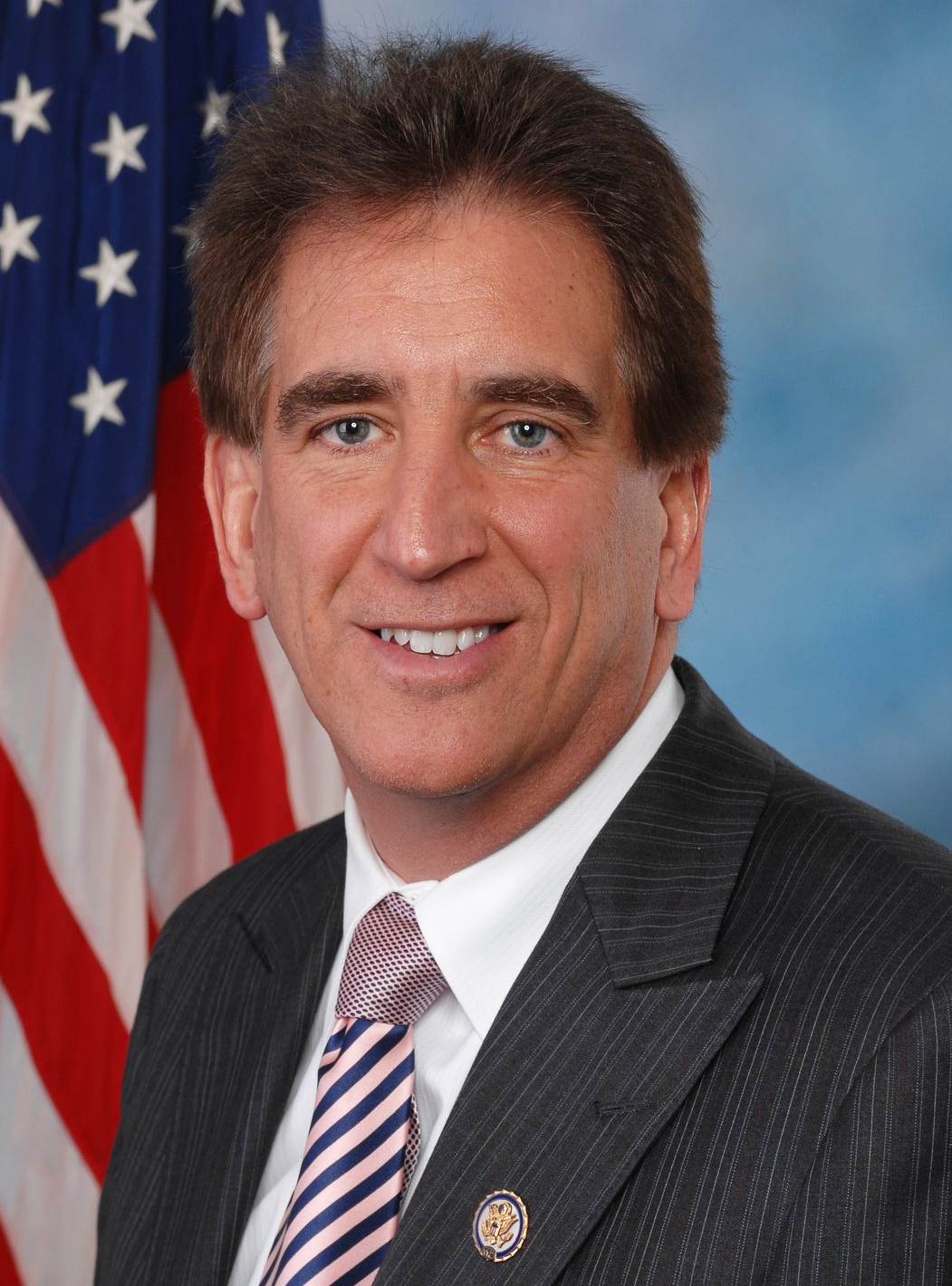

Nominee	Jim Renacci	Pete Crossland
Party	Republican	Democratic
Popular vote	132,176	75,199
Percentage	63.7%	36.3%
- County results Renacci: 50–60% 60–70% 70–80%
U.S. Representative before election
Jim Renacci
Republican
Elected U.S. Representative
Jim Renacci
Republican

The 16th district takes in the western suburbs of Cleveland, including Westlake, Parma, and Strongsville, as well as Medina, Norton, and North Canton. It had been held by Republican Jim Renacci since 2011.

=== Republican primary ===
==== Candidates ====
===== Nominee =====
- Jim Renacci, incumbent U.S. Representative

==== Primary results ====
Republican primary results
Party	Candidate	Votes	%
Republican	Jim Renacci (incumbent)	37,040	100.0

=== Democratic primary ===
Democrats were hoping to recruit a strong challenger to Renacci, as he had only won by 4 points in 2012.

==== Candidates ====
===== Nominee =====
- Pete Crossland, emeritus Professor of Political Science at Kent State University and former state representative

===== Eliminated in primary =====
- James Donenwirth, businessman

==== Primary results ====
Democratic primary results
Party	Candidate	Votes	%
Democratic	Pete Crossland	14,635	58.1
Democratic	James Donenwirth	10,575	41.9
Total votes		25,210	100.0

=== General election ===
==== Endorsements ====
Jim Renacci (R)

Organizations

- National Federation of Independent Business
- National Rifle Association - Political Victory Fund
- National Right to Life Committee

Newspapers

- Cleveland Plain Dealer
Pete Crossland (D)

Labor unions

- AFL-CIO
- American Federation of State, County and Municipal Employees
- Communication Workers of America
- International Brotherhood of Boilermakers
- United Auto Workers

Newspapers

- The Akron Beacon-Journal

==== Predictions ====
Source	Ranking	As of
The Cook Political Report	Safe R	November 3, 2014
Rothenberg	Safe R	October 24, 2014
Sabato's Crystal Ball	Safe R	October 30, 2014
RCP	Safe R	November 2, 2014
Daily Kos Elections	Safe R	November 4, 2014

==== Debate ====
2014 Ohio's 16th congressional district debate
No.	Date	Host	Moderator	Link	Republican	Democratic
Key: P Participant A Absent N Not invited I Invited W Withdrawn						
Key: P Participant A Absent N Not invited I Invited W Withdrawn					Jim Renacci	Pete Crossland
1	Sep. 25, 2014	City Club of Cleveland	Tom Beres		P	P

==== Results ====
Ohio's 16th congressional district, 2014
Party	Candidate	Votes	%
Republican	Jim Renacci (incumbent)	132,176	63.7
Democratic	Pete Crossland	75,199	36.3
Total votes		207,375	100.0
Republican hold			

== See also ==
- 2014 United States House of Representatives elections
- 2014 United States elections
