= Pete Crossland =

American politician

Member of the Ohio House of Representatives from the 42nd district
- In office January 3, 1973 – March 11, 1983
- Preceded by: Robert Manning
- Succeeded by: Vernon Sykes

Personal details
- Born: Peter Nelson Crossland, Jr. May 8, 1937 (age 89)
- Party: Democratic

Peter Nelson Crossland (born May 8, 1937) is a former member of the Ohio House of Representatives.

== Early life ==
Crossland earned a B.A. from Miami University in 1959. He attained a B.D. from Yale University in 1963 and a Ph.D. from Duke University in 1966. From 1966 to 1995, Crossland was a professor of Political Science at Kent State University.

== Political career ==
=== Ohio House of Representative ===
Crossland was a member of the Ohio House of Representatives from 1973 to 1983 before he was appointed as assistant director of the Ohio Department of Youth Services by Governor Richard Celeste.

While a member of the Ohio House of Representatives, Crossland authored 17 bills that were enacted into law and also served as chairman of the House Finance and Human Services committees.

=== Summit County Council ===
Crossland served as a member of the Summit County Council for 22 years. He began his first term on the council as an at-large member in 1988. He was then elected as the District 4 representative, serving from 1993 to 2006. District 4 is composed of portions of west, north and central Akron. As a county councilman, Crossland championed efforts to establish fiscal stability for the county by pushing through and then removing a temporary tax. In 2001, he received an Environmental Awareness Award, presented by the Summit Soil and Water Conservation District, for his distinguished leadership on innovative riparian legislation.

He is currently a Professor Emeritus of Political Science at Kent State University.

=== United States House of Representatives ===
In 2014, Crossland unsuccessfully challenged U.S. Representative Jim Renacci for Ohio's 16th congressional district.
