= Michael Wager (politician) =

Michael Keith Wager
- Born: May 17, 1951
- Died: July 8, 2023 (aged 72)
- Education: American University; Columbia University; New York University
- Occupation: Attorney
- Political party: Democratic
- Spouse: Peggy Gries Wager
- Children: Four daughters

Michael Wager (May 17, 1951 – July 8, 2023) was an attorney for Taft Stettinius & Hollister in Cleveland, Ohio, serving as the Chair of the firm's Business & Finance Group. Wager was the Democratic nominee for Ohio's 14th congressional district in 2014 and 2016.

== Personal life and education ==
Wager earned his B.A. from American University in 1973 and his J.D. from New York University School of Law in 1981, where he was Editor-in-Chief of the Journal of International Law and Politics. He also earned his MA from Columbia University in 1976. Wager has taught courses on urban policy and the U.S. judicial system at Case Western Reserve University in the Department of Political Science.

== Career ==
During the 1970s, Wager worked as a staff member for Representatives Charles Vanik and Mary Rose Oakar of Ohio, as well as Senator Lawton Chiles. More recently, Wager served as Senator Sherrod Brown's campaign finance chair.

Wager is an attorney with Taft Stettinius & Hollister, where he specializes in corporate governance, strategic growth, and corporate compliance and FCPA investigations. Before joining Taft, Wager was a partner at Squire Sanders & Dempsey LLP. Wager has served on the boards of numerous organizations including Clean Ohio Council, Northeast Ohio Development Fund, Cuyahoga County Renewable Energy Task Force, the White House Business Council, University Hospitals Seidman Cancer Center, West Side Ecumenical Ministry, the Gateway Economic Development Corporation of Greater Cleveland, the Quicken Loans Arena (formerly Gund Arena), Michael Anthony Holdings Inc., Reynard American Partners, L.P., American Speedy Printing Centers and Sembcorp Utilities (formerly Cascal N.V.).

Wager served on the Cleveland-Cuyahoga County Port Authority from 2002 to 2009, serving as chairman by the end of his tenure. Wager had supported an aggressive plan to redevelop the Cuyahoga River waterfront and related infrastructure investment, but was not reappointed by Cleveland Mayor Frank G. Jackson.

== 2014 congressional candidacy ==
Michael Wager announced his candidacy for Congress in Ohio's 14th congressional district in December 2012. The seat is currently held by Republican Congressman David Joyce who assumed office in 2013, and prevailed over State Representative Matt Lynch in the May 6, 2014 Republican primary by a final tally of 55% to 45%. On March 3, 2014, Wager, who was unopposed in the Democratic primary, was designated as an Emerging Race in the "Red-to-Blue" program of the Democratic Congressional Campaign Committee. Wager lost the November 4th election in a three-way contest with the incumbent Republican David Joyce and Libertarian David Macko. 2014 was an election cycle of historically low turnout in Ohio and the 14th Congressional District, as the campaign of Democratic candidate for Governor, Ed FitzGerald, faltered and adversely affected other democratic candidates. The final vote tallies:

Election results
Year	Office	Election	Subject	Party	Votes	%	Opponent	Party	Votes	%	Opponent	Party	Votes	%
2014	U.S. House of Representatives	General	Dave Joyce	Republican	135,736	63.26%	Michael Wager	Democratic	70,856	33.02%	David Macko	Libertarian	7,988	3.72%

== 2016 congressional candidacy ==
On March 15, 2016, Wager won the Democratic primary election, defeating former Ashtabula County Common Pleas Judge, Alfred Mackey.

The final vote tallies:

Election results
Year	Office	Election	Incumbent	Party	Votes	%	Opponent	Party	Votes	%
2016	U.S. House of Representatives	General	Dave Joyce	Republican	219,191	62.58%	Michael Wager	Democratic	130,907	37.37%
