= Jim Renacci =

American politician (born 1958)

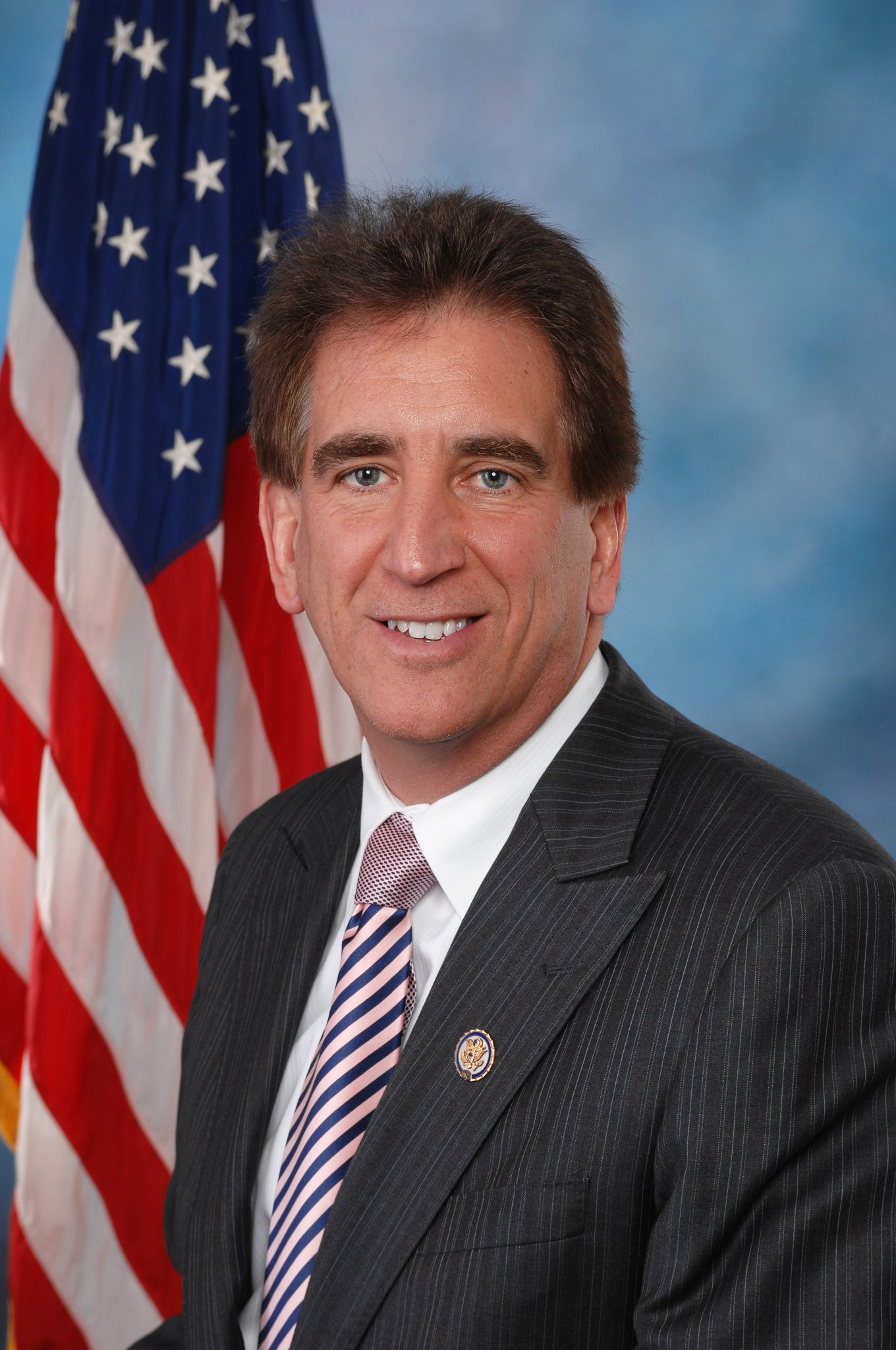
- Official portrait, 2011

Member of the U.S. House of Representatives from Ohio's 16th district
- In office January 3, 2011 – January 3, 2019
- Preceded by: John Boccieri
- Succeeded by: Anthony Gonzalez

Mayor of Wadsworth
- In office July 15, 2004 – July 17, 2008
- Preceded by: Caesar Carrino
- Succeeded by: Robin Laubaugh

Personal details
- Born: December 3, 1958 (age 67) Monongahela, Pennsylvania, U.S.
- Party: Republican
- Spouse: Tina Renacci
- Children: 3
- Education: Indiana University of Pennsylvania (BS)

James B. Renacci (/rɪˈneɪsi/ rih-NAY-see; born December 3, 1958) is an American accountant, businessman, and politician who served as the U.S. representative for Ohio's 16th congressional district from 2011 to 2019. A member of the Republican Party, he is a former city council president and two-term Mayor of Wadsworth, Ohio. In 2018, Renacci was the unsuccessful Republican nominee for the U.S. Senate, losing to Democratic incumbent Sherrod Brown by a 7-point margin. He also ran unsuccessfully in the 2022 Republican primary for governor of Ohio, losing to incumbent Mike DeWine. Renacci served as the chairman of the Republican Party of Medina County from 2020 to 2025.

== Early life and education ==
James Renacci was born December 3, 1958, in Monongahela, Pennsylvania, the son of Anna Marie (Sasko), a nurse, and Evo Renacci, a railroad worker. Renacci earned a degree in business administration from Indiana University of Pennsylvania and became a Certified Public Accountant and financial advisor.

== Business career ==
In 2003, Renacci formed the LTC Companies group, a financial consulting service that had partial ownership of three Harley-Davidson dealerships in Columbus, the Lifestyle Communities Pavilion in Columbus, and Renacci-Doraty Chevrolet in Wadsworth.

Renacci has been involved with real estate, automobile dealerships, nursing homes, and other businesses. He has made use of the legal system during his business career, including initiating legal proceedings against former business partners, companies, and the state of Ohio. He has also been sued, including for the wrongful death of a patient in one of the nursing homes he owns. That case was settled out of court.

Renacci was a partner and managing board member of the former Arena Football League's Columbus Destroyers.

Renacci also served as AFL Executive Committee Vice Chairman and was a partial owner of the Lancaster JetHawks, a defunct minor league baseball team.

== U.S. House of Representatives ==
=== Elections ===
2010

Renacci announced on August 24, 2009, that he would run for the U.S. House of Representatives in Ohio's 16th district, officially filing on January 11, 2010. Renacci ran as a "Contender" of the National Republican Congressional Committee in its "Young Guns" program. Renacci defeated Democratic incumbent John Boccieri by 52% to 41% with 7% of the vote going to Libertarian candidate Jeffrey Blevins.

2012

The Plain Dealer reported in September 2011 that the new district map of Ohio would place Representative Betty Sutton in "a Republican leaning district that's being constructed to favor Renacci." In December, Sutton filed to run against Renacci. Later that month, Roll Call reported that a poll taken at least two months earlier showed the two candidates "neck and neck at 45 percent." The race was included on the Washington Post's list of top 10 House races to watch in 2012. Renacci defeated Sutton by a 52% to 48% margin on election day.

In 2012, the Federal Bureau of Investigation investigated campaign contributions made by employees of an Ohio-based direct marketing corporation, Suarez Corporation Industries, to the campaigns of Renacci and Josh Mandel. Renacci's campaign returned all of the donations. The owner of the company was later only found guilty of witness tampering in the case and served time in prison.

=== Tenure ===
Renacci was ranked the 46th most bipartisan member of the U.S. House of Representatives during the 114th Congress (and the third most bipartisan member of the U.S. House of Representatives from Ohio) in the Bipartisan Index created by The Lugar Center and the McCourt School of Public Policy that ranks members of the United States Congress by their degree of bipartisanship (by measuring the frequency each member's bills attract co-sponsors from the opposite party and each member's co-sponsorship of bills by members of the opposite party).

He is a member of the Republican Study Committee and Republican Main Street Partnership.

==== LGBT rights ====
In 2015, Renacci was one of 60 Republicans who voted to uphold President Barack Obama's 2014 executive order banning federal contractors from making hiring decisions that discriminate based on sexual orientation or gender identity.

In 2016, Renacci was among 43 Republicans to have voted for the Maloney Amendment to H.R. 5055 which would prohibit the use of funds for government contractors who discriminate against LGBT employees.

=== Committee assignments ===
- Committee on Ways and Means
  - Subcommittee on Tax Policy
  - Subcommittee on Social Security
- Committee on the Budget

In the 112th Congress, Renacci served on the Committee on Financial Services, as vice chair of the Subcommittee on Financial Institutions and Consumer Credit, and a member of the Subcommittee on Oversight and Investigations.

=== Caucus memberships ===
Renacci has been a member of the following caucuses:

- Republican Study Committee
- Congressional Coal Caucus
- Congressional Steel Caucus
- Congressional CPA Caucus
- NorthEast-MidWest Coalition
- General Aviation Caucus
- Hydrogen & Fuel Cell Caucus
- Congressional Academic Medicine Caucus (113th Congress)

== 2018 election campaigns ==
=== Gubernatorial ===
In January 2017, several news outlets reported that Renacci was considering running for Governor of Ohio in 2018. Politico reported that "as a wealthy auto dealer prior to being elected to Congress, Renacci would potentially be able to self-fund a statewide bid." On March 21, 2017, Renacci announced his intention to run for the Republican nomination for governor of Ohio in 2018. He dropped out of the governor's race in January 2018 in order to run for U.S. Senate.

=== U.S. Senate ===
On January 10, 2018, Renacci announced his candidacy for the U.S. Senate. On May 8, 2018, he won the Republican primary, becoming the Republican nominee for the U.S. Senate from Ohio. In his campaign, Renacci was endorsed by President Donald Trump and Vice President Mike Pence.

In 2018, he was ranked Ohio's wealthiest Congress member. In 2018, he was endorsed by Donald Trump in his race for Brown's seat in Senate. During debates with Sherrod Brown, a debate at WOSU-TV studios in Columbus was almost cancelled after "last-minute arguing between the two sides, fueled by Renacci's recent escalation of personal attacks against Brown."

In March 2018, the Associated Press reported that as a registered lobbyist, Renacci had failed to report $50,000 in political contributions he had been given from 2008 to 2010. Renacci's campaign, in response, said he never lobbied, and had only been registered as a lobbyist with a consulting firm, Smokerise International Group, he helped found in 2008 as a "precautionary measure." Although Renacci's lawyer provided paperwork to journalists showing he had been listed as "inactive" as a lobbyist in 2009, the Associated Press found Renacci's lobbyist registration was deactivated in May 2011, the year when the paperwork was filed, and four months after he entered Congress.

In October 2018, he defended flying on the plane of a strip club owner to meet with religious figures, staying "He's a volunteer who... I met during the campaign. He asked to volunteer for me. I'm not going to vet volunteers, and I'm not going to vet the press's looking at volunteers." At the time, press and Ohio Republicans noted that since the May primary, Renacci had spent half a million on advertising, while Brown had spent $12.5 million, and "some Ohio Republicans have questioned whether Renacci's lack of advertising reflects his unwillingness to spend his own money on his race. Renacci has loaned his campaign $4 million of his own money, which represent[ed] the majority of his campaign fundraising."

Renacci was defeated by incumbent Democratic U.S. Senator Sherrod Brown in the November 6, 2018, general election. Brown received 53% of the vote, while Renacci received 47%.

== Post-congressional career ==
As of 2019, Renacci was the chairman of Ohio's Future Foundation, which he founded after losing the 2018 U.S. Senate election to Brown.

On June 25, 2020, Renacci announced that he had been drafted to serve as the Chairman of the Medina County GOP. He resigned at the end of 2025.

=== 2022 Ohio gubernatorial campaign ===
Renacci wrote op-eds criticizing Ohio governor Mike DeWine. In May 2021, NBC News reported that Brad Parscale was offering unpaid support to Renacci in considering a gubernatorial bid. In a tweet criticizing Governor Mike DeWine in June 2021, WKYC hinted Renacci might enter the race for governor in 2022. He launched a primary campaign officially later on June 9, 2021. He stated in an interview, "Ohio cannot afford for Mike DeWine to be the governor anymore. My path may have been diverted in 2018 but my will really to change Ohio was not." He said he wouldn't have hired Amy Acton, Ohio Department of Health director, saying her announcement of early predictions about COVID-19 had been a "scare tactic. That scared people." With his gubernatorial bid advised by Brad Parscale, Renacci also stated "Trump is still a friend. I think in the end if I get an opportunity to talk with him, which I'm hoping to be able to do that, he'll see that Jim Renacci has a really good opportunity." Although he had stated his support for Trump, by June 22, 2021, Trump hadn't endorsed a candidate in the Ohio Senate or gubernatorial races. Alongside Parscale, Renacci brought in "numerous" other former Trump staffers to his campaign, according to The Gazette. Renacci lost the Republican primary election to incumbent Governor Mike DeWine garnering 28% percent of the vote compared to DeWine's 48%.

== Personal life ==
In 2012, The Christian Science Monitor included Renacci in its list of the 10 richest members of Congress, estimating his net worth at $36.67 million.

In 2017, Renacci's net worth was estimated at $83.32 million.

In June 2016, the Ohio Supreme Court unanimously ruled that the state of Ohio must refund $359,822 that Renacci and his wife had paid in penalties in a dispute over their 2000 taxes. The court's opinion stated that the Ohio tax commissioner had abused his discretion by penalizing the Renaccis because the couple had reasonably believed they did not owe taxes on profits from an entity that the state later determined was subject to taxation. The Renaccis had relied on an earlier legal interpretation in delaying tax payments.

Renacci is Roman Catholic.

== Electoral history ==
Election results
Year	Office	Election	Subject	Party	Votes	%	Opponent	Party	Votes	%	Opponent	Party	Votes	%
2010	U.S. House of Representatives	General	Jim Renacci	Republican	114,652	52%	John Boccieri	Democratic	90,833	41%	Jeffrey Blevins	Libertarian	14,585	7%
2012	U.S. House of Representatives	General	Jim Renacci (incumbent)	Republican	185,167	52%	Betty Sutton	Democratic	170,604	48%				
2014	U.S. House of Representatives	General	Jim Renacci (incumbent)	Republican	130,463	64%	Pete Crossland	Democratic	74,158	36%				
2016	U.S. House of Representatives	General	Jim Renacci (incumbent)	Republican	221,495	65%	Keith Mundy	Democratic	117,296	35%				
2018	United States Senate	General	Jim Renacci	Republican	2,011,832	47%	Sherrod Brown (incumbent)	Democratic	2,286,730	53%				

Ohio Gubernatorial Primary 2021 Mike DeWine (R) 48% Jim Renacci (R) 28%

U.S. House of Representatives
Preceded by John Boccieri	Member of the U.S. House of Representatives from Ohio's 16th congressional district 2011–2019	Succeeded by Anthony Gonzalez
Party political offices
Preceded by Josh Mandel	Republican nominee for U.S. Senator from Ohio (Class 1); 2018	Succeeded by Bernie Moreno
U.S. order of precedence (ceremonial)
Preceded by Jean Schmidt as Former U.S. Representative	Order of precedence of the United States as Former U.S. Representative	Succeeded by Chris John as Former U.S. Representative
