= Electoral history of William Henry Harrison =

Elections featuring President of the US

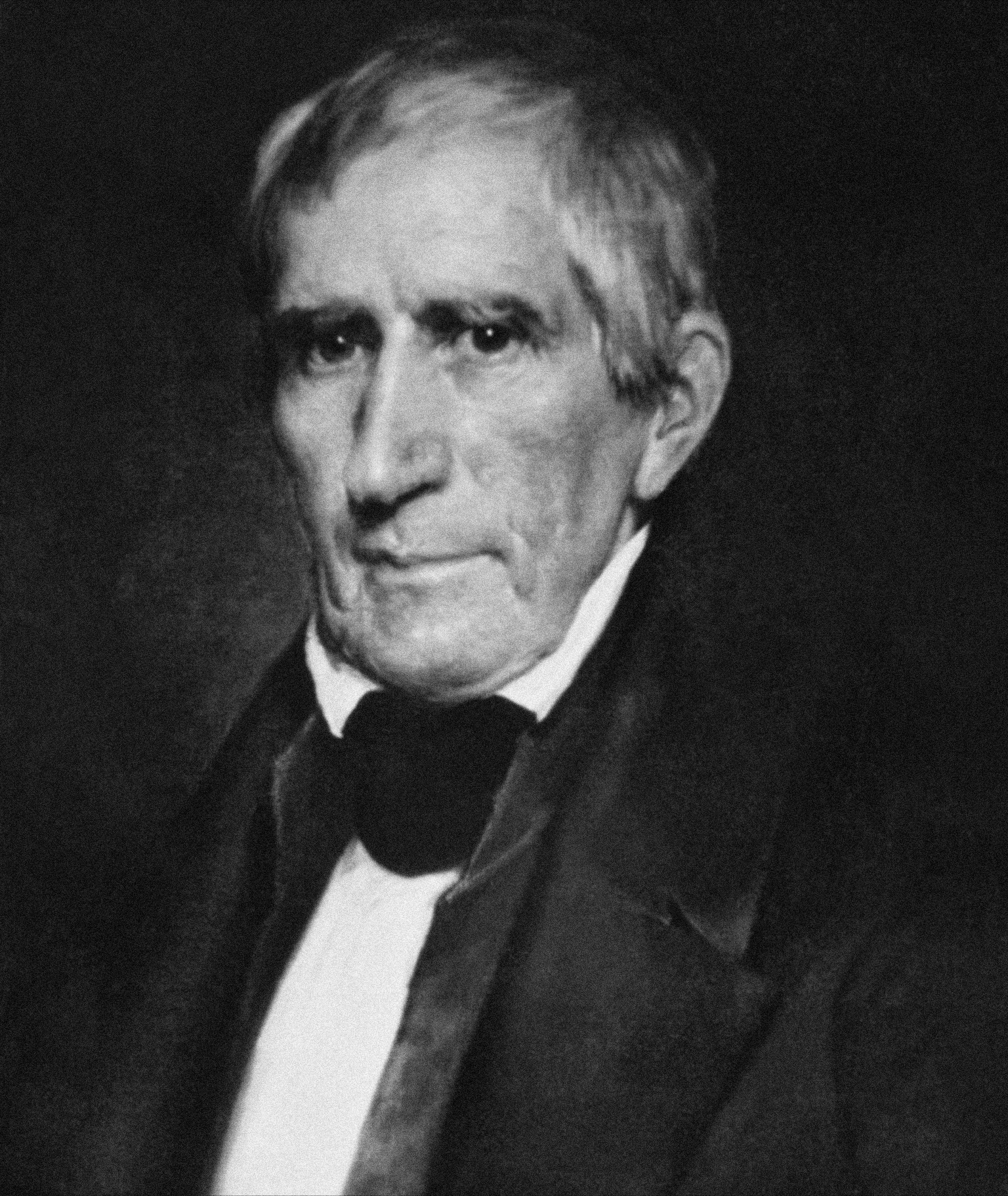
President William Henry Harrison

Electoral history of William Henry Harrison, who served as the 9th president of the United States (1841); United States Minister to Gran Colombia (1828–1829); United States senator from Ohio (1825–1828); United States representative from Ohio (1816–1819) and as the first governor of the Indiana Territory (1801–1812).

== House races ==
=== 1816 ===
Ohio U.S. House of Representatives special election District 1, 1816
Party	Candidate	Votes	%
Democratic-Republican	William H. Harrison	3,370	58.64%
Democratic-Republican	Thomas R. Ross	1,783	31.02%
Federalist	William Cortenus Schenck	351	6.11%
Federalist	William Corry	112	1.95%
Democratic-Republican	Matthais Ross	91	1.58%
Democratic-Republican	Ethan Allen Brown	40	0.70%
Total votes		5,747	100%

Ohio U.S. House of Representatives election District 1, 1816
Party	Candidate	Votes	%
Democratic-Republican	William H. Harrison	3,253	57.19%
Democratic-Republican	Thomas R. Ross	1,365	24.00%
Federalist	William Corry	593	10.43%
Federalist	William Cortenus Schenck	344	6.05%
Democratic-Republican	Matthais Ross	88	1.55%
Democratic-Republican	Ethan Allen Brown	45	0.79%
Total votes		5,688	100%

=== 1822 ===
Ohio U.S. House of Representatives election District 1, 1822
Party	Candidate	Votes	%
Democratic-Republican	James W. Gazlay	3,176	52.85%
Democratic-Republican	William H. Harrison	2,834	47.15%
Total votes		6,010	100%

== Senate races ==
=== 1821 ===
Ohio Senate election Ballot One, 1821
Party	Candidate	Votes	%
Democratic-Republican	Benjamin Ruggles	41	43.62%
Democratic-Republican	William H. Harrison	37	39.36%
Democratic-Republican	John C. Wright	12	12.77%
Democratic-Republican	Thomas Morris	3	3.19%
Democratic-Republican	John MacLean	1	1.06%
Total votes		94	100%

Ohio Senate election Ballot Two, 1821
Party	Candidate	Votes	%
Democratic-Republican	Benjamin Ruggles	47	50.00%
Democratic-Republican	William H. Harrison	39	41.49%
Democratic-Republican	John C. Wright	8	8.51%
Total votes		94	100%

Ohio Senate election Ballot Three, 1821
Party	Candidate	Votes	%
Democratic-Republican	Benjamin Ruggles	47	46.53%
Democratic-Republican	William H. Harrison	41	40.59%
Democratic-Republican	Robert Lucas	6	5.94%
Democratic-Republican	John C. Wright	4	3.96%
Total votes		101	100%

Ohio Senate election Ballot Four, 1821
Party	Candidate	Votes	%
Democratic-Republican	Benjamin Ruggles	52	50.98%
Democratic-Republican	William H. Harrison	43	42.16%
Democratic-Republican	John C. Wright	4	3.92%
Democratic-Republican	Robert Lucas	3	2.94%
Total votes		102	100%

=== 1822 ===
Ohio Senate special election Ballot One, 1822
Party	Candidate	Votes	%
Democratic-Republican	Thomas E. Worthington	32	31.68%
Democratic-Republican	Ethan Allen Brown	26	25.74%
Democratic-Republican	John Maclean	22	21.78%
Democratic-Republican	William Henry Harrison	17	16.83%
Democratic-Republican	Robert Lucas	3	2.97%
Democratic-Republican	Joseph Halsey Crane	1	0.99%
Total votes		101	100%

Ohio Senate special election Ballot Two, 1822
Party	Candidate	Votes	%
Democratic-Republican	Thomas E. Worthington	32	33.00%
Democratic-Republican	Ethan Allen Brown	30	30.00%
Democratic-Republican	John Maclean	24	24.00%
Democratic-Republican	William Henry Harrison	13	13.00%
Total votes		100	100%

Ohio Senate special election Ballot Three, 1822
Party	Candidate	Votes	%
Democratic-Republican	Thomas E. Worthington	35	32.41%
Democratic-Republican	Ethan Allen Brown	32	29.63%
Democratic-Republican	John Maclean	24	22.22%
Democratic-Republican	William Henry Harrison	8	7.41%
	Scattering	9	8.33%
Total votes		108	100%

Ohio Senate special election Ballot Four, 1822
Party	Candidate	Votes	%
Democratic-Republican	Thomas E. Worthington	36	34.29%
Democratic-Republican	Ethan Allen Brown	35	33.33%
Democratic-Republican	John Maclean	26	24.76%
Democratic-Republican	William Henry Harrison	4	3.81%
	Scattering	4	3.81%
Total votes		105	100%

=== 1825 ===
Ohio Senate election Ballot One, 1825
Party	Candidate	Votes	%
Democratic-Republican	William Henry Harrison	38	35.85%
Democratic-Republican	Wyllys Stillman	34	32.08%
Democratic-Republican	Thomas Worthington	19	17.92%
Democratic-Republican	Ethan Allen Brown	15	14.15%
Total votes		106	100%

Ohio Senate election Ballot Two, 1825
Party	Candidate	Votes	%
Democratic-Republican	William Henry Harrison	48	45.71%
Democratic-Republican	Wyllys Stillman	34	32.38%
Democratic-Republican	Thomas Worthington	18	17.14%
Democratic-Republican	Ethan Allen Brown	5	4.76%
Total votes		105	100%

Ohio Senate election Ballot Three, 1825
Party	Candidate	Votes	%
Democratic-Republican	William Henry Harrison	53	49.07%
Democratic-Republican	Wyllys Stillman	42	38.89%
Democratic-Republican	Thomas Worthington	9	8.33%
Democratic-Republican	Ethan Allen Brown	4	3.70%
Total votes		108	100%

Ohio Senate election Ballot Four, 1825
Party	Candidate	Votes	%
Democratic-Republican	William Henry Harrison	58	54.21%
Democratic-Republican	Wyllys Stillman	44	41.12%
Democratic-Republican	Thomas Worthington	3	2.80%
Democratic-Republican	Ethan Allen Brown	2	1.87%
Total votes		107	100%

== Presidential elections ==
=== 1836 ===
Presidential candidate	Party	Home state	Popular vote^{(a)}		Electoral vote
Presidential candidate	Party	Home state	Count	Percentage	Electoral vote
Martin Van Buren	Democratic	New York	764,176	50.83%	170
William Henry Harrison	Whig	Ohio	550,816	36.63%	73
Hugh Lawson White	Whig	Tennessee	146,107	9.72%	26
Daniel Webster	Whig	Massachusetts	41,201	2.74%	14
Willie Person Mangum	Whig	North Carolina	—^{(b)}	—	11
Other			1,234	0.08%	0
Total			1,503,534	100.0%	294
Needed to win					148

=== 1840 ===
United States presidential election, 1840
Party	Candidate	Running mate	Popular vote		Electoral vote	
Party	Candidate	Running mate	Count	%	Count	%
Whig	William Henry Harrison of Ohio	John Tyler of Virginia	1,275,390	52.9%	234	100.00%
Democratic	Martin Van Buren of New York	Richard Mentor Johnson/Littleton W. Tazewell/James K. Polk of Kentucky/Virginia/Tennessee	1,128,854	46.8%	60	0.00%
Liberty	James G. Birney of New York	Thomas Earle of Pennsylvania	6,797	0.3%	0	0.00%
Total			2,411,808	100.00%	294	100.00%
