= Robert Todd Lytle =

American politician

Robert T. Lytle

Member of the U.S. House of Representatives from Ohio's 1st district
- In office March 4, 1833 – March 10, 1834
- Preceded by: James Findlay
- In office December 27, 1834 – March 3, 1835
- Succeeded by: Bellamy Storer

Member of the Ohio House of Representatives from the Hamilton County district
- In office December 1, 1828 – December 6, 1829 Serving with Elijah Hayward; Alexander Duncan
- Preceded by: Elijah Hayward; John C. Short; Peter Bell
- Succeeded by: Samuel Reese; Alexander Duncan; David T. Disney; George Graham

Personal details
- Born: Robert Todd Lytle; May 19, 1804 Williamsburg, Ohio
- Died: December 22, 1839 (age 35) New Orleans, Louisiana
- Resting place: Spring Grove Cemetery
- Party: Jacksonian
- Spouse: Elizabeth Haines
- Children: William, Josephine, Elizabeth Haines

Robert Todd Lytle (May 19, 1804 – December 22, 1839) was a 19th-century lawyer and politician who represented Ohio in the United States House of Representatives for one term from 1833 to 1835.

== Early life and career ==
Lytle was born in Williamsburg, Ohio, a nephew of John Rowan. He attended the common schools and Cincinnati College, and studied law in Louisville, Kentucky, where he was admitted to the bar in 1824. He started professional practice in Cincinnati, Ohio.

Married Elizabeth Haines of New Jersey November 30, 1825. They had a son William Haines Lytle, and two daughters, Josephine R., and Elizabeth Haines Lytle.

He was elected county prosecuting attorney, and a member of the State house of representatives in 1828 and 1829.

=== Congress ===
He was then elected as a Jacksonian to the Twenty-third Congress and served from March 4, 1833, until March 10, 1834, when he resigned. He was reelected to fill the vacancy caused by his own resignation and served from December 27, 1834, to March 3, 1835.

=== Later career ===
After running as an unsuccessful candidate for reelection in 1834 to the Twenty-fourth Congress, Lytle resumed his law practice, focusing principally on real estate law. Lytle was an opponent of free black men and encouraged mob attacks against African Americans in Cincinnati. In 1836 he led rally that encouraged violence against African Americans, stating to the crowd that they should "castrate the men and the women!" He served as Surveyor General of the Northwest Territory in 1834–1838, and major general of Ohio Militia in 1838.

=== Death and burial ===
Lytle died in New Orleans, Louisiana on December 22, 1839. He was buried in Spring Grove Cemetery in Cincinnati.

U.S. House of Representatives
Preceded by James Findlay	Member of the U.S. House of Representatives from Ohio's 1st congressional district 1833–1834	Succeeded by himself
Preceded by himself	Member of the U.S. House of Representatives from Ohio's 1st congressional district 1834–1835	Succeeded by Bellamy Storer
