= Alexander Duncan (politician) =

American politician

Member of the U.S. House of Representatives from Ohio's first district
- In office March 4, 1837 – March 3, 1841
- Preceded by: Bellamy Storer
- Succeeded by: Nathanael G. Pendleton
- In office March 4, 1843 – March 3, 1845
- Preceded by: Nathanael G. Pendleton
- Succeeded by: James J. Faran

Member of the Ohio House of Representatives from the Hamilton County district
- In office December 1, 1828 – December 5, 1830 Serving with Elijah Hayward; Robert Todd Lytle; Samuel Reese; David T. Disney; George Graham
- Preceded by: Elijah Hayward; John C. Short; Peter Bell
- Succeeded by: Samuel Reese; Daniel Stone; Leonard Armstrong
- In office December 5, 1831 – December 2, 1832 Serving with Daniel H. Hawes; David T. Disney; John Burgoyne
- Preceded by: Samuel Reese; Daniel Stone; Leonard Armstrong
- Succeeded by: Adam N. Riddle; David T. Disney; Samuel Bond; Israel Brown

Member of the Ohio Senate from the Hamilton County district
- In office December 3, 1832 – November 30, 1834 Serving with David T. Disney; Samuel R. Miller
- Preceded by: Jonathan Cilley; Samuel R. Miller
- Succeeded by: Henry Morse; David T. Disney

Personal details
- Born: 1788 Bottle Hill, New Jersey
- Died: March 23, 1853 (aged 64–65) Madisonville, Cincinnati, Ohio
- Resting place: Laurel Cemetery
- Party: Democratic

Alexander Duncan (1788 – March 23, 1853) was a 19th-century American medical doctor who served as a U.S. representative from Ohio for four terms from 1837 to 1845.

== Biography ==
Born in Bottle Hill (now Madison), Morris County, New Jersey, Duncan studied and practiced medicine. He moved to Ohio and settled in Cincinnati.

=== State legislature ===
He served as member of the Ohio House of Representatives in 1828, 1829, 1831 and 1832. He then served in the Ohio Senate from 1832 to 1834.

=== Congress ===
Duncan was elected as a Democrat to the Twenty-fifth and Twenty-sixth Congresses (March 4, 1837 – March 3, 1841). He was an unsuccessful candidate for reelection in 1840 to the Twenty-seventh Congress but came back to win a seat in the Twenty-eighth Congress (March 4, 1843 – March 3, 1845).

He did not run in 1844 for reelection to the Twenty-ninth Congress but instead resumed the practice of his profession.

=== Death and burial ===
He died in Madisonville (now a part of Cincinnati), Hamilton County, Ohio, March 23, 1853, and is interred in Laurel Cemetery.

== Sources ==
- United States Congress. "Alexander Duncan (id: D000528)". Biographical Directory of the United States Congress.

U.S. House of Representatives
Preceded by Bellamy Storer	Member of the U.S. House of Representatives from Ohio's 1st congressional district 1837–1841	Succeeded by Nathanael G. Pendleton
Preceded by Robert Todd Lytle	Member of the U.S. House of Representatives from Ohio's 1st congressional district 1843–1845	Succeeded by James J. Faran
