= Bellamy Storer =

Bellamy Storer may refer to:

- Bellamy Storer (Ohio politician) (1796–1875), U.S. Representative from Ohio, served in the 24th Congress
- Bellamy Storer (ambassador) (1847–1922), his son, U.S. Representative from Ohio, served in the 52nd and 53rd Congresses, and ambassador to several countries
