= James Wickes Taylor =

American diplomat

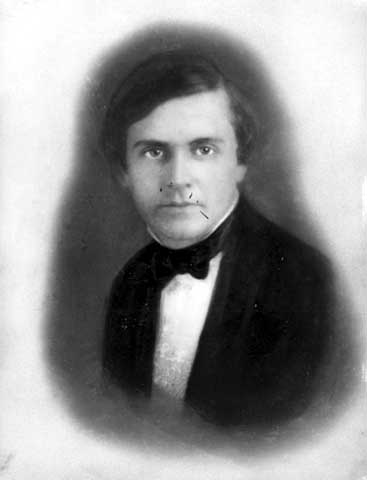
James Wickes Taylor

James Wickes Taylor (1819–1893) was an American diplomat. He was born in Starkey, New York, and, after his formal education, studied law under his father. He was admitted to the bar in Ohio in 1843 and in 1846 established the Cincinnati Morning Signal newspaper while taking an active role in politics.

He enjoyed a varied and successful career on a number of fronts in business and government. He functioned as a special agent with the US Treasury Department from 1859 to 1869. His experience there led to his appointment as United States Consul in Winnipeg, Manitoba, Canada, in 1870, a position he held until his death. Taylor spent the majority of his career advocating for the United States, through negotiation, military force or trade, to take the interior plains north of the 49th parallel, particularly the lands west of the Red River settlements along the Saskatchewan Valley. Having dedicated so much of his life to this cause, he was nicknamed James Wickes "Saskatchewan" Taylor.

== Career ==
James Wickes Taylor spent his career trying to help the United States of America gain the northwestern plains of Rupert's Land. Taylor believed that the land surrounding the Saskatchewan Valley and the Red River of the North was ideal for agricultural land that could, theoretically, support 6-8 million people. In 1866, Taylor spoke to the United States House of Representatives about the land north of the 49th parallel. Following Taylor's speech, Congress introduced a bill that favoured Taylor's views and encouraged the idea that America should be making an attempt at the northern plains. Unfortunately for Taylor, in a common theme that would haunt him throughout his career, American citizens did not respond with the same enthusiasm that Taylor had regarding the land to the north.

In 1867, a Minnesota Republican named Alexander Ramsey sent Taylor north to the Red River Colony, which is located in present-day Manitoba, as a special agent. Ramsey, like Taylor, saw the prospects of the land around the Saskatchewan Valley. Since Canada was still developing its federal power and the Saskatchewan Valley still belonged in Rupert's Land, Ramsey saw this as the perfect chance for the United States to sneak into a politically unstable country and gain the prairies. Taylor spent two years with his ear to the ground reporting back to Ramsey about the political situation in Red River. By 1869, Hamilton Fish, the Secretary of State to President Ulysses S. Grant, sent Taylor to Fort Garry, present-day Winnipeg, "to investigate and report full details of the revolt as well as all aspects of the territory and its inhabitants." During Taylor's time in Fort Garry, he predicted that the United States could purchase the land from Canada for as little as $25,000.

Following the uprising of Louis Riel, in March of 1870 Prime Minister John A. Macdonald agreed to meet with a few delegates from Riel's Red River Settlement. At the end, the negotiations were finalized and Manitoba was created. Taylor followed the Red River delegates all the way to Ottawa and stayed in constant contact with them in order to replay the information back to Fish. Taylor's daily reports back to Fish are considered today the most accurate record of the negotiation talks between Macdonald and the Red River delegates. Finally, after watching the creation of Manitoba, Fish decided that it was the end of the battle: Canada had gained the northwestern prairies.

On September 14, 1870, Taylor was appointed the United States Consul in Winnipeg. During the time when Canadian troops under General Wolseley were stationed in Winnipeg he was beaten by several soldiers, this incident occurring in June, 1871. The incident was published in The New York Times under the title "Military Reign of Terror." He wrote a report about his assault and made clear of his support of the French and Métis, "Outrages upon the French population are of daily occurrence - often most flagrant and cowardly in their character, and so far this incident has tended to identify me with this long-suffering population. I do not regret it." In September 1871 he was one of, if not the first person to alert Lieutenant-Governor Archibald of the coming Fenian attack on Manitoba. He remained in the Canadian prairies until his death in 1893.

Political offices
Preceded by Elijah Hayward	State librarian of Ohio; 1854–1856	Succeeded by William T. Coggeshall
