= Timothy Day =

Timothy Day may refer to:

- Timothy C. Day (1819–1869), U.S. Representative from Ohio
- Timothy E. Day (born 1979), American actor
