= William Corry (disambiguation) =

William M. Corry Jr. (1889–1920) was a U.S. Navy officer and Medal of Honor recipient.

William Corry may also refer to:

- William Corry (Cincinnati mayor) (1779–1833), American politician in Ohio
- Sir William Corry, 2nd Baronet (1859–1926), of the Corry baronets
- Sir William James Corry, 4th Baronet (1924–2000), of the Corry baronets

== See also ==
- William Cory (disambiguation)
- Will Corrie, British actor of the silent era
- Corry (disambiguation)
