= Nathalie Schenck Laimbeer =

American banker

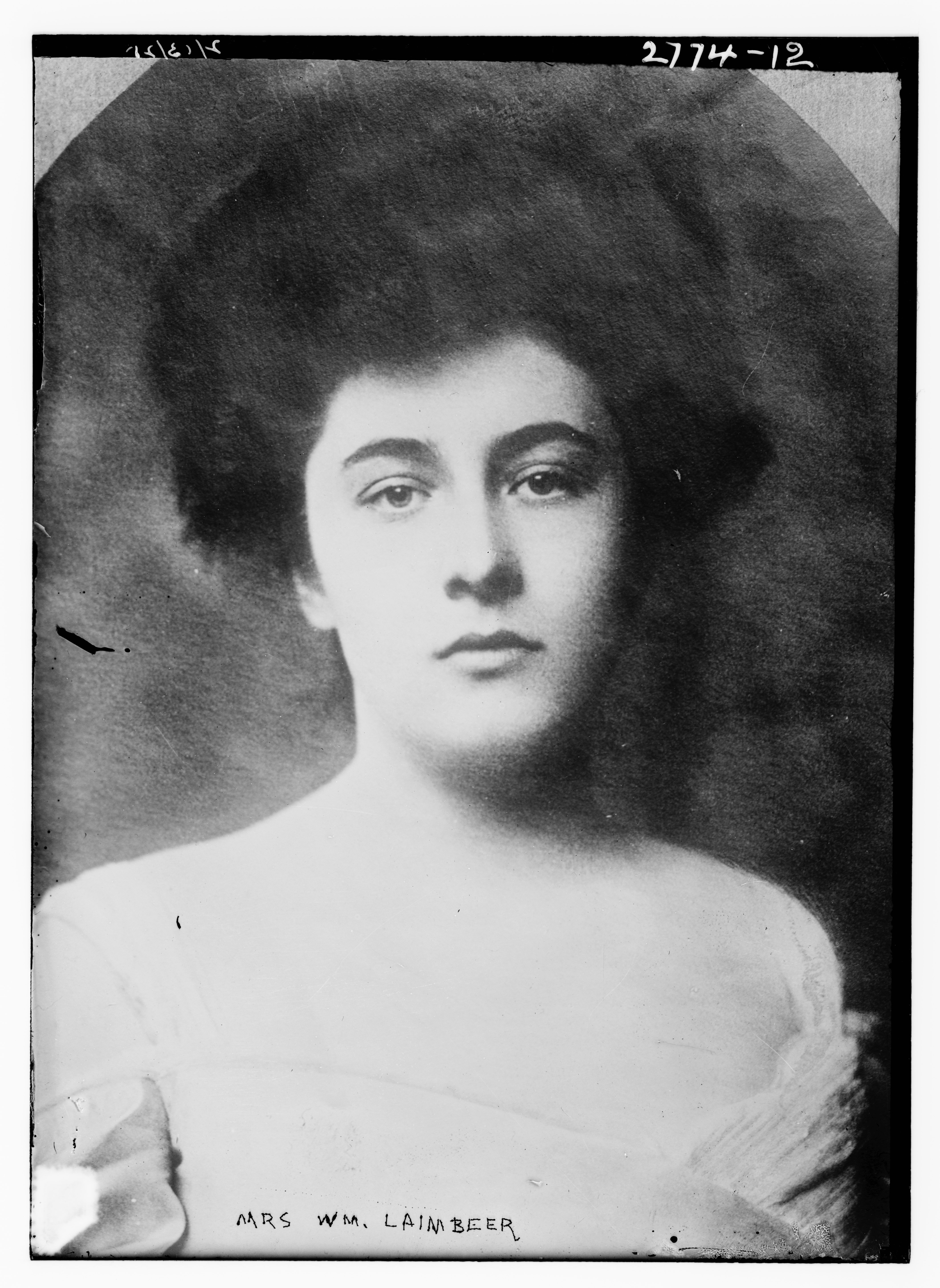
- Nathalie S. Laimbeer, from the Bain Newspaper Collection, Library of Congress
- Born: Nathalie Pendleton Cutting Schenck; December 4, 1882; New York City
- Died: October 25, 1929 (aged 46); New York City
- Other names: Nathalie S. Colins (during first marriage)
- Occupation(s): Banker, educator, philanthropist
- Relatives: Nathanael G. Pendleton (great-grandfather), John M. Schiff (son-in-law), Bill Laimbeer (great grandson)

Nathalie Schenck Laimbeer (December 4, 1882 – October 25, 1929) was an American banker, philanthropist, and socialite.

== Early life ==
Nathalie Pendleton Cutting Schenck was born in New York City, the daughter of Spotswood Dandridge Schenck and Effie Morgan Schenck. Congressman Nathanael G. Pendleton was her great-grandfather. At age 15, she raised $25,000 for the American Red Cross during the Spanish–American War, with a chain letter scheme asking friends to send dimes.

== Career ==
Laimbeer was best known as a socialite when she took a job with the Food Administration during World War I. After the war, she was manager of the Home Economics bureau of New York Edison, demonstrating kitchen applications of electricity, and in 1919 went into banking, as manager of the women's department of United States Mortgage and Trust Company. "The women's department makes it easier for women to do their banking business themselves, rather than have it done for them by men," she explained in a 1920 article. She was the first woman officer at National City Bank, where she was assistant cashier and head of the women's department from 1925 to 1926, when she retired for health reasons.

Laimbeer was president of the National Association of Bank Women, and was the first woman banker to address the American Bankers Association. She wrote articles on society topics for Harper's Bazaar, and on banking for The Delineator and New York World. She was active in the Child Study Association and supported the visiting nurse program at the Henry Street Settlement.

== Personal life ==
Nathalie Schenck married twice. She married Charles Glen Collins, of the British Army, in 1904; they had a son, George, before they divorced. She married stock broker William Laimbeer, widower of actress Clara Bloodgood, in 1909, and they had two daughters, Nathalie Lee Laimbeer Cornell and Josephine Laimbeer Schiff (wife of John M. Schiff). He died in an automobile accident in 1913. Nathalie Schenck Laimbeer was injured in the same accident, and had lingering health issues; she died at home in late October 1929, from heart disease, aged 46 years. She left over $125,000 to her children. She is the great grandmother of Bill Laimbeer.
