= William Turner Coggeshall =

American publisher, librarian and ambassador

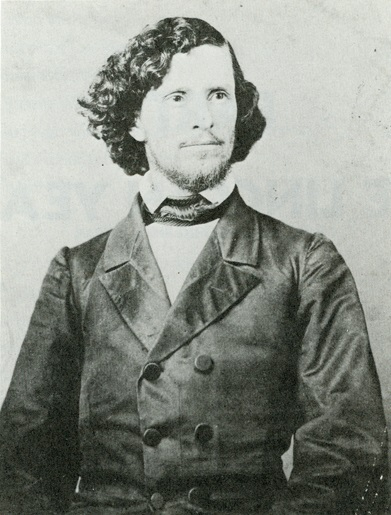

United States Ambassador to Ecuador
- In office September 20, 1866 – August 2, 1867
- Appointed by: Andrew Johnson
- Preceded by: Friedrich Hassaurek
- Succeeded by: David Alexander Nunn

Personal details
- Born: September 6, 1824 Lewistown, Pennsylvania
- Died: August 2, 1867 (aged 42) Quito, Ecuador
- Resting place: Green Lawn Cemetery, Columbus, Ohio
- Spouse: Mary Maria Carpenter
- Children: daughter Jesse (c.1851-10 January 1868)

William Turner Coggeshall (1824–1867) was an American publisher and librarian based in Ohio. Coggeshall also served as a self-appointed bodyguard for President Abraham Lincoln, but was out of town the evening the leader was assassinated.

He gained appointment in 1866 as the US ambassador to Ecuador, but died there of tuberculosis less than a year later. His daughter died there soon after of yellow fever. Congress appropriated funds to have both their bodies returned to Ohio for burial.

== Early life ==
William T. Coggeshall was born in Lewistown, Pennsylvania on September 6, 1824. He settled in Akron, Ohio in 1842, and published the temperance newspaper Cascade Roarer from 1844 to 1845. He married Mary Maria Carpenter on October 26, 1845.

== Publisher ==
In 1847, Coggeshall moved to Cincinnati, Ohio, where he wrote for and later edited the Western Fountain. He may also have written for the Gazette and Times. He traveled with General Louis Kossuth during 1851–1852, reporting on his tour and speeches for newspapers. In 1852 Coggeshall became assistant editor of the Daily Columbian, a news and business paper.

From 1854 to 1856, Coggeshall was publisher and editor of The Genius of the West, a literary magazine in Cincinnati. In 1856, he was in need of cash, and sold the magazine after securing appointment as State Librarian of Ohio by Governor Salmon P. Chase. He was re-appointed as Librarian and private secretary by Governor William Dennison, Jr. in 1860, and held those positions until 1862.

In 1860, Coggeshall published the book The Poets and Poetry of the West: With Biographical and Critical Notices. For this, he compiled contemporary poetry and authors. Among them was writer Rosella Rice, best known for her vivid descriptions of the legendary Johnny Appleseed.

== Lincoln's bodyguard ==
On February 13, 1861, President-elect Abraham Lincoln stopped at the state capitol of Ohio on his trip to Washington, D.C. for his inauguration. As the governor's representative, Coggeshall met Lincoln at the station, and escorted him to the statehouse. Coggeshall accompanied Lincoln to Washington as a reporter for the Ohio State Journal and served as a bodyguard.

He acted as bodyguard off and on for Lincoln, and was on the dais with him for the Gettysburg Address. Coggeshall had a private meeting with Lincoln on Good Friday, 1865, before embarking by rail for Ohio. After Lincoln's assassination that night, Coggeshall returned to Washington. He accompanied Lincoln's funeral train to Springfield, Illinois.

For benefit of the Ohio Soldier's Monument Fund, Coggeshall wrote Lincoln memorial: the journeys of Abraham Lincoln from Springfield to Washington, 1861, as president elect, and from Washington to Springfield, as president martyred; comprising an account of public ceremonies on the entire route, and full details of both journeys. (1865)

== Publisher and diplomat ==
Coggeshall bought the Springfield Republic in 1862 and sold it in 1865, when he became editor of the Ohio State Journal. By that time, his health was failing due to tuberculosis, which he had contracted early in the war while acting as a secret agent for the Union.

Desiring less stressful work and a healthier environment, he lobbied his political friends for appointment as United States Ambassador to Ecuador. He hoped the mountain air would be healthier for him (it was often recommended for patients with TB). He was formally appointed to the position by President Andrew Johnson in May 1866.

Coggeshall arrived in Quito on August 2, 1866, with his fifteen-year-old daughter Jesse. His health did not improve, and he died one year later. His daughter was detained by red tape from returning to the US, and served as acting ambassador for four months. She died at Guayaquil of yellow fever, on January 10, 1868. In 1869, Congress appropriated moneys to bring both bodies back to their hometown of Columbus, Ohio. They were re-interred at Green Lawn Cemetery in 1870.

== Publications ==
- Coggeshall, William T. (1860). Poets and Poetry of the West with Biographical and Critical Notices. Columbus: Follett, Foster and Company.

== Notes ==
Political offices
Preceded by James Wickes Taylor	State Librarians of Ohio; 1856-1862	Succeeded by Samuel G. Harbaugh
