= William Corry (Cincinnati mayor) =

American politician

William Corry (1779–1833) was a politician in the U.S. State of Ohio who was in the Ohio House of Representatives and was the Mayor of Cincinnati from 1815-1819.

William Corry was born in Virginia. His father was killed at the Battle of King's Mountain in 1781. William stayed on his mother's farm and attended local schools until age 20. In 1798, he was invited by William McMillan, a relative, to come to Cincinnati. He lived with McMillan and studied law in his office.

Corry was admitted to the bar in 1803. After McMillan's death in 1804, Corry moved to Hamilton and associated with John Reily. When Reily became clerk of courts, Corry practiced alone until his marriage in 1810. In 1807, he was elected to the Ohio House of Representatives from Butler County for the sixth General Assembly.

Corry returned to Cincinnati in 1811 to administer to trust for Mr. McMillan's estate. He was librarian for the Cincinnati Library, which operated from his home. In 1812, he represented Hamilton County in the Ohio House of Representatives for the eleventh General Assembly, and he was elected Mayor of Cincinnati in 1815. He was the only Mayor of the Town of Cincinnati from 1815 to 1819. Before 1815, Cincinnati was a village, and after 1819, it was a city.

After his term as mayor, Corry returned to practice of law, and he was twice more elected to the Ohio House for the 18th General Assembly, 1819 and the 25th General Assembly, 1826.

In his later years, Corry's health was poor, and he died in 1833. The village of Corryville was named for him and later annexed by Cincinnati.

== Notes ==
Political offices
| Preceded by Samuel W. Davies | Mayor of Cincinnati; 1815-1819 | Succeeded by Isaac G. Burnet |
Ohio House of Representatives
| Preceded by Solomon Line; James Shields | Representative from Butler County; 1807-1808; Served alongside: James McClure | Succeeded by James Shields; William Murray; James Heaton |
| Preceded by John Jones; Peter Bell; Ogden Ross | Representative from Hamilton County; 1812-1813; Served alongside: Ogden Ross; Peter Bell | Succeeded by Ephraim Brown; Zebulon Foster; Peter Bell |
| Preceded by Peter Bell; Andrew Mack; Samuel McHenry | Representative from Hamilton County; 1819-1820; Served alongside: Peter Bell; Samuel McHenry | Succeeded by Clayton Webb; Zacheus Biggs; Micajah T. Williams |
| Preceded by Elijah Hayward; Charles G. Swain; Samuel McHenry | Representative from Hamilton County; 1826-1827; Served alongside: Elijah Hayward; Charles G. Swain | Succeeded by Elijah Hayward; John C. Short; Peter Bell |
