= Ohio's 1st congressional district =

U.S. House district for Ohio

Coordinates: 39°10′N 84°34′W

- Interactive map of district boundaries
- Representative: Greg Landsman; D–Cincinnati
- Distribution: 92.5% urban; 7.5% rural
- Population (2025): 800,183
- Median household income: $85,975
- Ethnicity: 67.4% White; 19.2% Black; 4.4% Asian; 4.2% Two or more races; 4.0% Hispanic; 0.6% other
- Cook PVI: D+3

Ohio's 1st congressional district is represented by Democrat Greg Landsman. The district includes the city of Cincinnati, all of Warren County and borders the state of Kentucky. This district was once represented by President William Henry Harrison. After redistricting in 2010, the district was widely seen as heavily gerrymandered by state Republicans to protect the incumbent, Steve Chabot. Chabot lost the seat in 2022 to Landsman, after redistricting unified the city of Cincinnati into the district. The city was previously split between the 1st and 2nd districts. It is the wealthiest congressional district in Ohio, with 14.2 percent of households earning over $200,000, per a 2024 study.

The district is somewhat more Democratic than its predecessor even though it includes heavily Republican Warren County. Previous iterations of the district (before 2013) did not include Warren County. However, Hamilton County has double Warren County's population, creating a marginally Democratic seat.

== Demographics ==
According to the APM Research Lab's Voter Profile Tools (featuring the U.S. Census Bureau's 2019 American Community Survey), the district contained about 551,000 potential voters (citizens, age 18+). Of these, 74% are White and 21% are Black. Immigrants make up 4% of the district's potential voters. Median income among households (with one or more potential voter) in the district is about $64,000, while 11% of households live below the poverty line. 8% of those 25 and older have not earned a high school degree, while 34% hold a bachelor's or higher degree.

== Composition ==
For the 118th and successive Congresses (based on redistricting following the 2020 census), the district contains all or portions of the following counties, townships, and municipalities:

Hamilton County (27)

Amberley, Anderson Township, Arlington Heights, Blue Ash, Cincinnati, Columbia Township, Deer Park, Delhi Township, Elmwood Place, Evendale, Fairfax, Golf Manor, Loveland (part; also 2nd and 8th; shared with Clermont and Warren counties), Madeira, Mariemont, Milford (part; also 2nd; shared with Clermont County), Montgomery, Newtown, Norwood, Reading, Sharonville (part; also 8th), Silverton, St. Bernard, Symmes Township, Syracuse Township, Terrace Park, The Village of Indian Hill

Warren County (28)

All 28 townships and municipalities

== Recent election results from statewide races ==
=== 2023–2027 boundaries ===
Year	Office	Results
2008	President	Obama 51% - 48%
2012	President	Romney 50.01% - 49.99%
2016	President	Clinton 50% - 46%
2016	Senate	Portman 57% - 39%
2018	Senate	Brown 56% - 44%
2018	Governor	Cordray 50% - 47%
2018	Secretary of State	Clyde 51% - 47%
2018	Treasurer	Richardson Jr. 50.2% - 49.8%
2018	Auditor	Space 48% - 47%
2018	Attorney General	Dettelbach 52% - 48%
2020	President	Biden 53% - 45%
2022	Senate	Ryan 54% - 46%
2022	Governor	DeWine 55% - 45%
2022	Secretary of State	LaRose 51% - 48%
2022	Treasurer	Sprague 52% - 48%
2022	Auditor	Faber 51% - 49%
2022	Attorney General	Yost 52% - 48%
2024	President	Harris 53% - 46%
2024	Senate	Brown 54% - 43%

=== 2027–2033 boundaries ===
Year	Office	Results
2008	President	McCain 50% - 49%
2012	President	Romney 52% - 48%
2016	President	Trump 49% - 46%
2016	Senate	Portman 59% - 36%
2018	Senate	Brown 52% - 48%
2018	Governor	DeWine 50% - 47%
2018	Secretary of State	LaRose 50% - 48%
2018	Treasurer	Sprague 53% - 47%
2018	Auditor	Faber 50% - 45%
2018	Attorney General	Yost 51% - 49%
2020	President	Biden 49.3% - 49.1%
2022	Senate	Vance 50.1% - 49.9%
2022	Governor	DeWine 59% - 41%
2022	Secretary of State	LaRose 55% - 44%
2022	Treasurer	Sprague 56% - 44%
2022	Auditor	Faber 55% - 45%
2022	Attorney General	Yost 56% - 44%
2024	President	Trump 51% - 48%
2024	Senate	Brown 49% - 47%

== List of members representing the district ==
Member	Party	Years	Cong ress	Electoral history	Counties represented
District established March 4, 1813
John McLean (Lebanon)	Democratic- Republican	March 4, 1813 – April 1816	13th 14th	Elected in 1812. Re-elected in 1814. Resigned to become Associate Judge of the Ohio Supreme Court.	
Vacant	April 1816 – October 8, 1816	14th			
William Henry Harrison (Cincinnati)	Democratic- Republican	October 8, 1816 – March 3, 1819	14th 15th	Elected to finish McLean's term. Also elected the same day in 1816 to the next term. Retired.	
Thomas R. Ross (Lebanon)	Democratic- Republican	March 4, 1819 – March 3, 1823	16th 17th	Elected in 1818. Re-elected in 1820. Redistricted to the 2nd district.	
James W. Gazlay (Cincinnati)	Democratic- Republican	March 4, 1823 – March 3, 1825	18th	Elected in 1822. Lost re-election.	
James Findlay (Cincinnati)	Jacksonian	March 4, 1825 – March 3, 1833	19th 20th 21st 22nd	Elected in 1824. Re-elected in 1826. Re-elected in 1828. Re-elected in 1830. [data missing]	
Robert Todd Lytle (Cincinnati)	Jacksonian	March 4, 1833 – March 10, 1834	23rd	Elected in 1832. Resigned.	
Vacant		March 10, 1834 – December 27, 1834	23rd		
Robert Todd Lytle (Cincinnati)	Jacksonian	December 27, 1834 – March 3, 1835	23rd	Re-elected in 1834 to finish the vacant term. Was not elected to the next term.	
Bellamy Storer (Cincinnati)	Anti-Jacksonian	March 4, 1835 – March 3, 1837	24th	Elected in 1834. [data missing]	
Alexander Duncan (Cincinnati)	Democratic	March 4, 1837 – March 3, 1841	25th 26th	Elected in 1836. Re-elected in 1838. [data missing]	
Nathanael G. Pendleton (Cincinnati)	Whig	March 4, 1841 – March 3, 1843	27th	Elected in 1840. [data missing]	
Alexander Duncan (Cincinnati)	Democratic	March 4, 1843 – March 3, 1845	28th	Elected in 1843. [data missing]	
James J. Faran (Cincinnati)	Democratic	March 4, 1845 – March 3, 1849	29th 30th	Elected in 1844. Re-elected in 1846. [data missing]	
David T. Disney (Cincinnati)	Democratic	March 4, 1849 – March 3, 1855	31st 32nd 33rd	Elected in 1848. Re-elected in 1850. Re-elected in 1852. [data missing]	
Timothy C. Day (Cincinnati)	Anti-Nebraska	March 4, 1855 – March 3, 1857	34th	Elected in 1854. [data missing]	
George H. Pendleton (Cincinnati)	Democratic	March 4, 1857 – March 3, 1865	35th 36th 37th 38th	Elected in 1856. Re-elected in 1858. Re-elected in 1860. Re-elected in 1862. [data missing]	
Benjamin Eggleston (Cincinnati)	Republican	March 4, 1865 – March 3, 1869	39th 40th	Elected in 1864. Re-elected in 1866. Lost re-election.	
Peter W. Strader (Cincinnati)	Democratic	March 4, 1869 – March 3, 1871	41st	Elected in 1868. [data missing]	
Aaron F. Perry (Cincinnati)	Republican	March 4, 1871 – 1872	42nd	Elected in 1870. Resigned.	
Vacant		1872 – October 8, 1872	42nd		
Ozro J. Dodds (Cincinnati)	Democratic	October 8, 1872 – March 3, 1873	42nd	Elected to finish Perry's term. [data missing]	
Milton Sayler (Cincinnati)	Democratic	March 4, 1873 – March 3, 1879	43rd 44th 45th	Elected in 1872. Re-elected in 1874. Re-elected in 1876. [data missing]	
Benjamin Butterworth (Cincinnati)	Republican	March 4, 1879 – March 3, 1883	46th 47th	Elected in 1878. Re-elected in 1880. [data missing]	
John F. Follett (Cincinnati)	Democratic	March 4, 1883 – March 3, 1885	48th	Elected in 1882. [data missing]	
Benjamin Butterworth (Cincinnati)	Republican	March 4, 1885 – March 3, 1891	49th 50th 51st	Elected in 1884. Re-elected in 1886. Re-elected in 1888. [data missing]	
Bellamy Storer (Cincinnati)	Republican	March 4, 1891 – March 3, 1895	52nd 53rd	Elected in 1890. Re-elected in 1892. [data missing]	
Charles Phelps Taft (Cincinnati)	Republican	March 4, 1895 – March 3, 1897	54th	Elected in 1894. [data missing]	
William B. Shattuc (Madisonville)	Republican	March 4, 1897 – March 3, 1903	55th 56th 57th	Elected in 1896. Re-elected in 1898. Re-elected in 1900. [data missing]	
Nicholas Longworth (Cincinnati)	Republican	March 4, 1903 – March 3, 1913	58th 59th 60th 61st 62nd	Elected in 1902. Re-elected in 1904. Re-elected in 1906. Re-elected in 1908. Re-elected in 1910. Lost re-election.	
Stanley E. Bowdle (Cincinnati)	Democratic	March 4, 1913 – March 3, 1915	63rd	Elected in 1912. Lost re-election.	
Nicholas Longworth (Cincinnati)	Republican	March 4, 1915 – April 9, 1931	64th 65th 66th 67th 68th 69th 70th 71st 72nd	Elected in 1914. Re-elected in 1916. Re-elected in 1918. Re-elected in 1920. Re-elected in 1922. Re-elected in 1924. Re-elected in 1926. Re-elected in 1928. Re-elected in 1930. Died.	
Vacant		April 9, 1931 – November 3, 1931	72nd		
John B. Hollister (Cincinnati)	Republican	November 3, 1931 – January 3, 1937	72nd 73rd 74th	Elected to finish Longworth's term. Re-elected in 1932. Re-elected in 1934. Lost re-election.	
Joseph A. Dixon (Cincinnati)	Democratic	January 3, 1937 – January 3, 1939	75th	Elected in 1936. Lost re-election.	
Charles H. Elston (Cincinnati)	Republican	January 3, 1939 – January 3, 1953	76th 77th 78th 79th 80th 81st 82nd	Elected in 1938. Re-elected in 1940. Re-elected in 1942. Re-elected in 1944. Re-elected in 1946. Re-elected in 1948. Re-elected in 1950. Retired.	
Gordon H. Scherer (Cincinnati)	Republican	January 3, 1953 – January 3, 1963	83rd 84th 85th 86th 87th	Elected in 1952. Re-elected in 1954. Re-elected in 1956. Re-elected in 1958. Re-elected in 1960. Retired.	
Carl West Rich (Cincinnati)	Republican	January 3, 1963 – January 3, 1965	88th	Elected in 1962. Lost re-election.	
John J. Gilligan (Cincinnati)	Democratic	January 3, 1965 – January 3, 1967	89th	Elected in 1964. Lost re-election.	
Robert Taft Jr. (Cincinnati)	Republican	January 3, 1967 – January 3, 1971	90th 91st	Elected in 1966. Re-elected in 1968. Retired to run for U.S. Senator.	
William J. Keating (Cincinnati)	Republican	January 3, 1971 – January 3, 1974	92nd 93rd	Elected in 1970. Re-elected in 1972. Resigned.	
Vacant		January 3, 1974 – March 5, 1974	93rd		
Tom Luken (Cincinnati)	Democratic	March 5, 1974 – January 3, 1975	93rd	Elected to finish Keating's term. Lost re-election.	
Bill Gradison (Cincinnati)	Republican	January 3, 1975 – January 3, 1983	94th 95th 96th 97th	Elected in 1974. Re-elected in 1976. Re-elected in 1978. Re-elected in 1980. Redistricted to the 2nd district.	
Tom Luken (Cincinnati)	Democratic	January 3, 1983 – January 3, 1991	98th 99th 100th 101st	Redistricted from the 2nd district and re-elected in 1982. Re-elected in 1984. Re-elected in 1986. Re-elected in 1988. Retired.	
Charlie Luken (Cincinnati)	Democratic	January 3, 1991 – January 3, 1993	102nd	Elected in 1990. Retired.	
David S. Mann (Cincinnati)	Democratic	January 3, 1993 – January 3, 1995	103rd	Elected in 1992. Lost re-election.	
Steve Chabot (Cincinnati)	Republican	January 3, 1995 – January 3, 2009	104th 105th 106th 107th 108th 109th 110th	Elected in 1994. Re-elected in 1996. Re-elected in 1998. Re-elected in 2000. Re-elected in 2002. Re-elected in 2004. Re-elected in 2006. Lost re-election.	
Steve Chabot (Cincinnati)	Republican	January 3, 1995 – January 3, 2009	104th 105th 106th 107th 108th 109th 110th	Elected in 1994. Re-elected in 1996. Re-elected in 1998. Re-elected in 2000. Re-elected in 2002. Re-elected in 2004. Re-elected in 2006. Lost re-election.	2003–2013
Steve Driehaus (Cincinnati)	Democratic	January 3, 2009 – January 3, 2011	111th	Elected in 2008. Lost re-election.	2003–2013
Steve Chabot (Cincinnati)	Republican	January 3, 2011 – January 3, 2023	112th 113th 114th 115th 116th 117th	Elected again in 2010. Re-elected in 2012. Re-elected in 2014. Re-elected in 2016. Re-elected in 2018. Re-elected in 2020. Lost re-election.	2003–2013
Steve Chabot (Cincinnati)	Republican	January 3, 2011 – January 3, 2023	112th 113th 114th 115th 116th 117th	Elected again in 2010. Re-elected in 2012. Re-elected in 2014. Re-elected in 2016. Re-elected in 2018. Re-elected in 2020. Lost re-election.	2013–2023
Greg Landsman (Cincinnati)	Democratic	January 3, 2023 – present	118th 119th	Elected in 2022. Re-elected in 2024. Re-elected in 2026.	2023–2027

== Recent election results ==
Year	Democratic	Republican	Other
1920	John H. Allen: 40,195	√ Nicholas Longworth (Incumbent): 57,328	Eli G. Frankenstein: 1,134; Edward L. Hutchins (FL): 926
1922	Sidney G. Stricker: 30,945	√ Nicholas Longworth (Incumbent): 45,253	Edward L. Hutchins (FL): 3,094
1924	Thomas B. Paxton: 36,065	√ Nicholas Longworth (Incumbent): 58,125	
1926	John C. Rogers: 26,511	√ Nicholas Longworth (Incumbent): 45,317	Edward D. Colley: 268
1928	Arthur Espy: 49,880	√ Nicholas Longworth (Incumbent): 80,812	
1930	John W. Pattison: 46,974	√ Nicholas Longworth (Incumbent): 50,481	
1932	Edward H. Brink: 55,416	√ John B. Hollister (Incumbent): 66,018	
1934	Edwin G. Becker: 42,723	√ John B. Hollister (Incumbent): 53,985	
1936	√ Joseph A. Dixon: 71,935	John B. Hollister (Incumbent): 66,082	
1938	Joseph A. Dixon (Incumbent): 45,536	√ Charles H. Elston: 63,285	
1940	Joseph A. Dixon: 61,382	√ Charles H. Elston (Incumbent): 84,622	
1942	William H. Hessler: 33,884	√ Charles H. Elston (Incumbent): 54,120	
1944	Frank J. Richter: 62,617	√ Charles H. Elston (Incumbent): 82,373	
1946	G. Andrews Espy: 40,594	√ Charles H. Elston (Incumbent): 72,909	
1948	Morse Johnson: 69,240	√ Charles H. Elston (Incumbent): 73,952	
1950	Rollin H. Everett: 53,760	√ Charles H. Elston (Incumbent): 77,507	
1952	Walter A. Kelly: 60,015	√ Gordon H. Scherer: 96,385	
1954	Mrs. Warwick B. Hobart: 39,421	√ Gordon H. Scherer (Incumbent): 71,042	
1956	Leonard D. Slutz: 49,701	√ Gordon H. Scherer (Incumbent): 91,181	
1958	W. Ted Osborne: 54,119	√ Gordon H. Scherer (Incumbent): 70,686	
1960	W. Ted Osborne: 62,043	√ Gordon H. Scherer (Incumbent): 88,899	
1962	Monica Nolan: 44,264	√ Carl W. Rich: 74,320	
1964	√ John J. Gilligan: 74,525	Carl W. Rich (Incumbent): 69,114	
1966	John J. Gilligan (Incumbent): 62,580	√ Robert Taft Jr.: 70,366	
1968	Carl F. Heiser: 49,830	√ Robert Taft Jr. (Incumbent): 102,219	
1970	Bailey W. Turner: 39,820	√ William J. Keating: 89,169	
1972	Carl F. Heiser: 50,575	√ William J. Keating (Incumbent): 119,469	
1974	Thomas A. Luken (Incumbent): 67,685	√ Willis D. Gradison Jr.: 70,284	
1976	William F. Bowen: 56,995	√ Willis D. Gradison Jr. (Incumbent): 109,789	Christopher L. Martinson: 2,732
1978	Timothy M. Burke: 38,669	√ Willis D. Gradison Jr. (Incumbent): 73,593	Joseph E. May: 1,907
1980	Donald J. Zwick: 38,529	√ Willis D. Gradison Jr. (Incumbent): 124,080	Scott A. Breen: 3,571
1982	√ Thomas A. Luken (Incumbent): 99,143	John E. Held: 52,658	Jim Berms (L): 4,386
1984	√ Thomas A. Luken (Incumbent): 121,577	Norman A. Murdock: 88,859	Other: 10,222
1986	√ Thomas A. Luken (Incumbent): 90,477	Fred E. Morr: 56,100	
1988	√ Thomas A. Luken (Incumbent): 117,628	Steve Chabot: 90,738	
1990	√ Charles J. Luken: 83,932	Ken Blackwell: 80,362	
1992	√ David S. Mann: 120,190	Stephen Grote: 101,498	Jim Berns: 12,734
1994	David S. Mann (Incumbent): 72,822	√ Steve Chabot: 92,997	
1996	Mark P. Longabaugh: 94,719	√ Steve Chabot (Incumbent): 118,324	John G. Halley (N): 5,381
1998	Roxanne Qualls: 82,003	√ Steve Chabot (Incumbent): 92,421	
2000	John Cranley: 98,328	√ Steve Chabot (Incumbent): 116,768	David A. Groshoff (L): 3,399; Richard L. Stevenson (N): 1,933
2002	Greg Harris: 60,168	√ Steve Chabot (Incumbent): 110,760	
2004	Greg Harris: 116,320	√ Steve Chabot (Incumbent): 167,991	
2006	John Cranley: 90,963	√ Steve Chabot (Incumbent): 101,838	
2008	√ Steve Driehaus: 155,089	Steve Chabot (Incumbent): 140,469	Eric Wilson: 84; Rich Stevenson: 67
2010	Steve Driehaus (Incumbent): 92,672	√ Steve Chabot: 103,770	Jim Berns: 3,076; Rich Stevenson: 2,000
2012	Jeff Sinnard: 131,490	√ Steve Chabot (Incumbent): 201,907	Jim Berns (L): 9,674; Rich Stevenson (G): 6,654
2014	Fred Kundrata: 72,604	√ Steve Chabot (Incumbent): 124,779	
2016	Michele Young: 144,644	√ Steve Chabot (Incumbent): 210,014	
2018	Aftab Pureval: 141,118	√ Steve Chabot (Incumbent): 154,409	Dirk Kubala (L): 5,339
2020	Kate Schroder: 172,022	√ Steve Chabot (Incumbent): 199,560	Kevin David Kahn (L): 13,692 Kiumars Kiani (I) (WI): 11
2022	√ Greg Landsman: 156,416	Steve Chabot (Incumbent): 140,058	
2024	√ Greg Landsman (Incumbent): 213,916	Orlando Sonza: 177,993	
2026	√Greg Landsman (Incumbent): 163,137	Eric Conroy: 132,128	Nathan Weise (L): 8,058

=== 2010 ===
Ohio's 1st Congressional district election (2010)
Party	Candidate	Votes	%
Republican	Steve Chabot	103,770	51.49
Democratic	Steve Driehaus (Incumbent)	92,672	45.99
Libertarian	Jim Berns	3,076	1.53
Green	Rich Stevenson	2,000	0.99
Total votes		201,518	100.00
Republican gain from Democratic			

Source: "Representative to Congress: November 2, 2010". Ohio Secretary of State. Archived from the original on December 27, 2010.

=== 2012 ===
Ohio's 1st congressional district (2012)
Party	Candidate	Votes	%
Republican	Steve Chabot (incumbent)	201,907	57.7
Democratic	Jeff Sinnard	131,490	37.6
Libertarian	Jim Berns	9,674	2.8
Green	Rich Stevenson	6,645	1.9
Total votes		349,716	100.0
Republican hold			

=== 2014 ===
Ohio's 1st congressional district (2014)
Party	Candidate	Votes	%
Republican	Steve Chabot (incumbent)	124,779	63.2
Democratic	Fred Kundrata	72,604	36.8
Total votes		197,383	100.0
Republican hold			

=== 2016 ===
Ohio's 1st congressional district (2016)
Party	Candidate	Votes	%
Republican	Steve Chabot (incumbent)	210,014	59.2
Democratic	Michele Young	144,644	40.8
Independent	Sholom D. Keller (write-in)	114	0.0
Independent	Kiumars G. Kiani (Write-in)	16	0.0
Total votes		354,788	100.0
Republican hold			

=== 2018 ===
Ohio's 1st congressional district (2018)
Party	Candidate	Votes	%
Republican	Steve Chabot (incumbent)	154,409	51.3
Democratic	Aftab Pureval	141,118	46.9
Libertarian	Dirk Kubala	5,339	1.8
Independent	Kiumars Kiani (write-in)	5	0.0
Total votes		300,871	100.0
Republican hold			

=== 2020 ===
Ohio's 1st congressional district (2020)
Party	Candidate	Votes	%
Republican	Steve Chabot (incumbent)	199,560	51.8
Democratic	Kate Schroder	172,022	44.7
Libertarian	Kevin David Kahn	13,692	3.5
Write-in		11	0.0
Total votes		385,285	100.0
Republican hold			

=== 2022 ===
Ohio's 1st congressional district (2022)
Party	Candidate	Votes	%
Democratic	Greg Landsman	156,416	52.8
Republican	Steve Chabot (incumbent)	140,058	47.2
Total votes		296,474	100.0
Democratic gain from Republican			

=== 2024 ===
Ohio's 1st congressional district (2024)
Party	Candidate	Votes	%
Democratic	Greg Landsman (incumbent)	213,916	54.6
Republican	Orlando Sonza	177,993	45.4
Total votes		391,909	100.0
Democratic hold			

== See also ==
- Ohio's congressional districts
- List of United States congressional districts

U.S. House of Representatives
Preceded by Massachusetts's 2nd congressional district (Frederick H. Gillett)	Home district of the speaker of the House (Nicholas Longworth); December 7, 1925 – March 4, 1931	Succeeded by Texas's 15th congressional district (John Nance Garner)
