= Ozro J. Dodds =

American politician

Ozro John Dodds
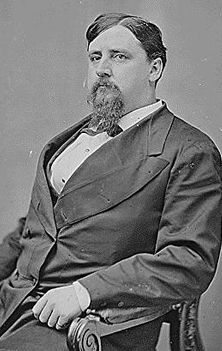

Member of the U.S. House of Representatives from Ohio's 1st district
- In office October 8, 1872 – March 3, 1873
- Preceded by: Aaron F. Perry
- Succeeded by: Milton Sayler

Member of the Ohio House of Representatives from the Hamilton County district
- In office January 3, 1870 – December 31, 1870 Serving with nine others
- Preceded by: nine others
- Succeeded by: ten others

Personal details
- Born: March 22, 1840 Cincinnati, Ohio
- Died: April 18, 1882 (aged 42) Columbus, Ohio
- Resting place: Spring Grove Cemetery
- Party: Democratic
- Education: Miami University; Cincinnati Law School

Ozro John Dodds (March 22, 1840 – April 18, 1882) was an American lawyer and Civil War veteran who briefly served as a U.S. representative from Ohio from 1872 to 1873.

== Early life, education and career ==
Born in Cincinnati, Ohio, Dodds attended the common schools, and Miami University, Oxford, Ohio, for four years.

=== Civil War ===
At the outbreak of the Civil War, he organized Captain Dodd's Miami University company and enlisted on April 18, 1861, as captain of Company B, Twentieth Ohio Volunteer Regiment. He served as captain of Company F, Eighty-first Ohio Volunteer Infantry from September 1, 1861, to January 1, 1863. He became lieutenant colonel of the First Alabama Union Cavalry October 18, 1863.

=== Law degree ===
At the close of the war was given his degree from Miami University. He studied law at Cincinnati Law School. He was admitted to the bar in 1866 and commenced practice in Cincinnati.

== Political career ==
He served as member of the Ohio House of Representatives in 1870 and 1871.

=== Congress ===
Dodds was elected as a Democrat to the Forty-second Congress to fill the vacancy caused by the resignation of Aaron F. Perry and served from October 8, 1872, to March 3, 1873. He was not a candidate for renomination in 1872.

== Later career and death ==
He resumed the practice of law at Cincinnati.

He died in Columbus, Ohio, April 18, 1882. He was interred in Spring Grove Cemetery, Cincinnati, Ohio.

== Legacy ==
Dodds Hall is a residence hall on the Miami University campus named in his memory.

U.S. House of Representatives
Preceded by Aaron F. Perry	Member of the U.S. House of Representatives from Ohio's 1st congressional district 1872-1873	Succeeded by Milton Sayler
