= James J. Faran =

American lawyer and politician (1808–1892)

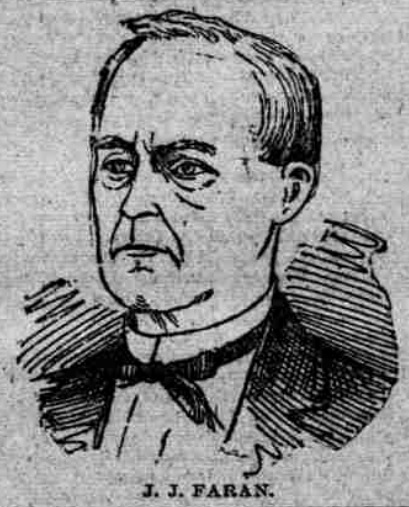
- 1886 illustration

Member of the U.S. House of Representatives from Ohio's 1st district
- In office March 4, 1845 – March 3, 1849
- Preceded by: Alexander Duncan
- Succeeded by: David T. Disney

Member of the Ohio House of Representatives
- In office 1835-1836; 1837-1839

Member of the Ohio Senate
- In office 1839-1843

Mayor of Cincinnati
- In office 1855-1857

Personal details
- Born: December 29, 1808 Cincinnati, Ohio, U.S.
- Died: December 12, 1892 (aged 83) Cincinnati, Ohio, U.S.
- Resting place: Spring Grove Cemetery
- Party: Democratic
- Education: Miami University

James John Faran (December 29, 1808 – December 12, 1892) was an American lawyer and politician who served two terms as a U.S. representative from Ohio from 1845 to 1849.

== Early life and career ==
James John Faran was born on December 29, 1808, in Cincinnati, Ohio. Faran attended the common schools, and was graduated from Miami University, Oxford, Ohio, in 1831. He studied law and was admitted to the bar in 1833. He commenced practice in Cincinnati.

== Political career ==
Faran was elected as a Democrat a member of the State house of representatives 1835-1839 and served as speaker in 1838 and 1839. He served in the State senate 1839–1843, and was its presiding officer 1841–1843. He served as associate editor and proprietor of The Cincinnati Enquirer 1844–1881.

=== Congress ===
Faran was elected as a Democrat to the Twenty-ninth and Thirtieth Congresses (March 4, 1845 – March 3, 1849). He served as chairman of the Committee on Public Buildings and Grounds (Twenty-ninth Congress). He was not a candidate for renomination in 1848.

== Later career ==
Faran was appointed by Governor Medill one of the commissioners to supervise the erection of the State capitol in 1854.

=== Mayor of Cincinnati ===
Faran served as mayor of Cincinnati 1855–1857. He was appointed by President Buchanan postmaster of Cincinnati June 4, 1855, and served until October 21, 1859. He served as delegate to the 1860 Democratic National Convention at Baltimore. He engaged in newspaper work until shortly before his death.

== Death ==
On December 12, 1892, Faran died in Cincinnati, Ohio. He was interred in Spring Grove Cemetery.

== Sources ==
- United States Congress. "James J. Faran (id: F000014)". Biographical Directory of the United States Congress.

U.S. House of Representatives
Preceded by Alexander Duncan	United States Representative from Ohio's 1st congressional district March 4, 1845–March 3, 1849	Succeeded by David T. Disney
Ohio House of Representatives
Preceded by John C. Short, W. C. Anderson, Samuel Bond, Elisha Hotchkiss	Representative from Hamilton County; December 7, 1835-December 4, 1836; Served alongside: William Condin, Andrew Porter, D. Hosbrook	Succeeded by Israel Brown, James Armstrong, George W. Holmes
Preceded by Israel Brown, James Armstrong, George W. Holmes	Representative from Hamilton County; December 4, 1837-December 1, 1839; Served alongside: A. F. Carpenter, James Given, Israel Brown	Succeeded by Robert Moore, T. B. Henderson
Preceded by Charles Anthony	Speaker of the House; December 3, 1838-December 1, 1839	Succeeded by Thomas J. Buchanan
Ohio Senate
Preceded by George W. Holmes, William Oliver	Senator from Hamilton County District; December 2, 1839-December 3, 1843; Served alongside: George W. Holmes (1839-1842), Oliver Jones (1842-1843)	Succeeded by David T. Disney, Oliver Jones
Political offices
Preceded by David T. Snelbaker	Mayor of Cincinnati; 1855-1857	Succeeded by Nicholas W. Thomas
