= Fort Findlay =

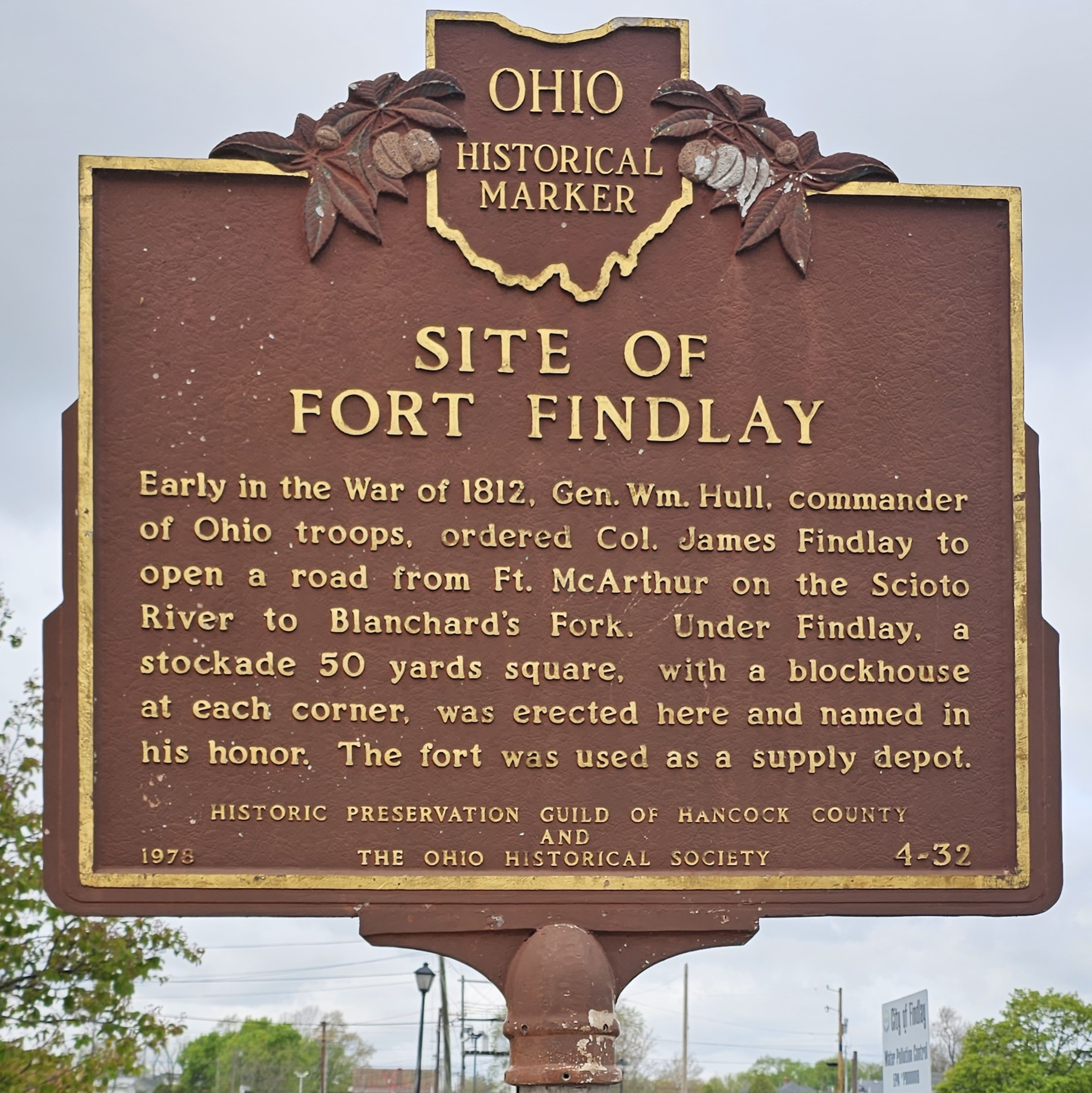
Historical marker for the site of the fort in present-day Findlay, Ohio

Fort Findlay was erected in northwestern Ohio in 1812 as part of United States defenses during the War of 1812. It was established by Col. James Findlay under the orders of General Hull, and named in honor of the colonel. The stockade-style fort had blockhouses at each corner and comprised about fifty square yards total space. The fort was garrisoned by a company under the command of Captain Arthur Thomas during the War of 1812. And historic marker is located on South Main Street near the Ralph-Cole Memorial Bridge in Findlay, Ohio

Jacob A. Kimmell, an area physician and early 20th-century local historian, wrote that no battles took place there:

"So far as known there were no battles fought at Findlay and the garrison duty was no doubt monotonous and irksome. After the close of the war, Captain Thomas' company returned to Urbana. On their journey home, the Captain and his son lost their horses and separated from the rest of the company in search of them. They encamped at the Big Spring near Solomonstown, about five miles from Bellefontaine and the next morning were found murdered and scalped."

There were still armed confrontations in this period with Native Americans in the region who resisted the encroachment of European Americans.

A 1909 history of the county by Ezra Parmenter said that five male members of his ancestral family died in the defense of Fort Findlay during the War of 1812.
