= List of state librarians of Ohio =

The State Library of Ohio was created in 1817 as a service to the government of the state. Over the years, the State Library has increased its scope to include service to all residents of the state. The position of State Librarian of Ohio was created with the creation of the first State Library of Ohio in 1821. In the early days of the state library, the position was a political 'reward' given by the Governor or legislature. An illustration of that is the fact that the position of changed twice between two men from 1896 to 1921. During the administration of a Democratic Governor, John Newman held the position. Then, when a Republican Governor was elected Charles Galbreath held the job. The first professional librarian was not appointed until 1921. Today, the post is held by a trained librarian who is responsible for the overall management of the State Library.

The first State Librarian was John Harper, appointed by Governor Worthington. The governor had purchased 509 books to be used as a resource for the Ohio State Legislature. Mr. Harper was paid $2.00 per day for each day the legislature was in session. The second librarian was appointed by a senator in 1820. In 1823 the Ohio legislature passed a law defining the term of state librarian as three years with an annual salary of $200.

An outcome of the Ohio Constitutional Convention of 1851 was that the appointment of state librarian was returned to the Governor, though appointment was subject to consent of the Ohio State Senate. The salary was increased to $10,000 and length of term changed to 2 years. A Board of Library Commissioners, consisting of the Governor, Secretary of State, and the State Librarian, was created by the Ohio General Assembly in 1858.

In 1921 the State Library became a division of the Department of Education with a five-member board overseeing policies of the library and the appointment of the State Librarian. Four members of the board were appointed by the Governor and the Director of Education would be the fifth member. The State Librarian was the board's secretary.

== List ==
State Librarians of Ohio
| Librarian | Term | Notes |
|---|---|---|
| John L. Harper | 1817–1818 | |
| John McElvain | 1818–1820 | |
| David S. Brodrick | 1820–1824 | |
| Zachariah Mills | 1824–1842 | |
| Thomas Kennedy | 1842–1845 | |
| John B. Greiner | 1845–1851 | |
| Elijah Hayward | 1851–1854 | |
| James Wickes Taylor | 1854–1856 | Organized and bound the 1850 census; promoted the preservation of state documents; began exchange system between Ohio and other states and countries |
| William T. Coggeshall | 1856–1862 | |
| Samuel G. Harbaugh | 1862–1874 | |
| Walter C. Hood | 1874–1875 | |
| Hiram H. Robinson | 1875–1877 | |
| Rodney M. Stimson | 1877–1879 | Donated 19,000 books and newspapers related to the history of the Northwest Territory and Ohio; elected State Senator in 1869 and 1871 |
| Henry V. Kerr | 1879–1881 | |
| Joseph H. Geiger | 1881–1883 | |
| Howard T. Conard | 1883–1885 | Author |
| Hamilton W. Pierson | 1885–1886 | |
| Francis Butler Loomis | 1886–1887 | |
| John M. Doane | 1887–1889 | |
| William B. Sibley | 1889–1890 | |
| John C. Tuthill | 1890–1892 | |
| Joseph P. Smith | 1892–1896 | |
| Charles B. Galbreath | 1896–1911 | Instituted the system of traveling libraries, first president of the National Association of State Librarians in 1900 |
| John H. Newman | 1911–1915 | |
| Charles B. Galbreath | 1915–1918 | |
| John H. Newman | 1918–1921 | |
| Herbert S. Hirshberg | 1921–1927 | First professionally trained librarian to hold the position |
| George E. McCormick | 1928–1931 | |
| John H. Newman | 1931–1933 | |
| Paul A. T. Noon | 1933–1942 | |
| Walter T. Brahm | 1942–1963 | President of the National Association of State Libraries 1959-1960; awarded the Ohio Library Association’s Librarian of the Year award in 1959 |
| Ruth Hess, Acting State Librarian | 1963–1966 | |
| Joseph F. Shubert | 1966–1977 | |
| Richard M. Cheski | 1978–1995 | |
| Michael S. Lucas | 1996–2004 | |
| Joanne Budler | 2004–2010 | |
| Beverly Cain | 2010–2020 | |
| Wendy Knapp | 2020–2024 | |
| Beverly Cain | 2024–2024 | Beverly Cain was appointed as Interim State Librarian beginning April 29, 2024 by the State Library of Ohio Board |
| Mandy Knapp | 2025– | |
