= James Findlay (Ohio politician) =

American politician (1770–1835)

James B. Findlay
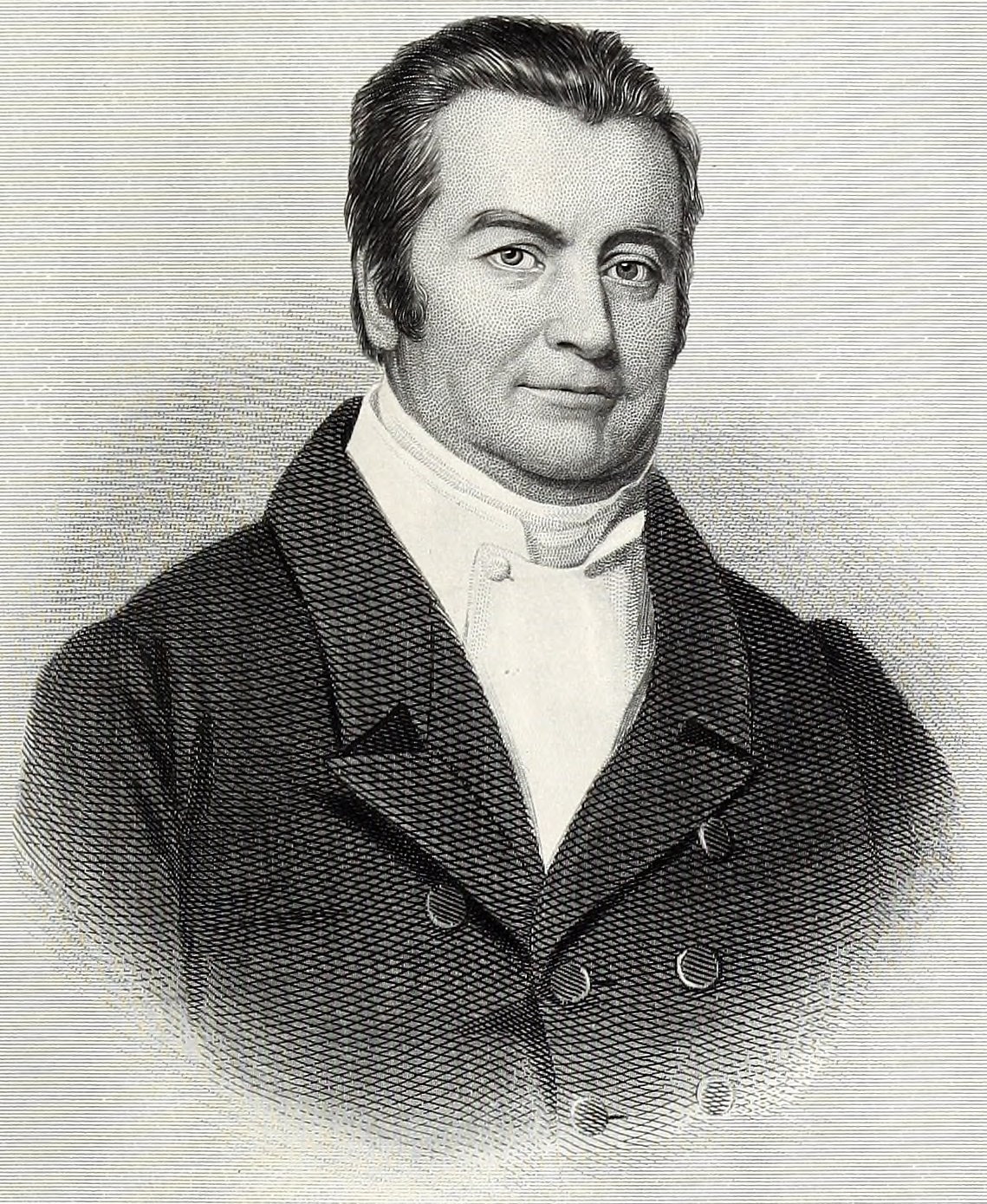

Member of the U.S. House of Representatives from Ohio's first district
- In office March 4, 1825 – March 3, 1833
- Preceded by: James W. Gazlay
- Succeeded by: Robert Todd Lytle

Personal details
- Born: October 12, 1770 Mercersburg, Province of Pennsylvania, British America
- Died: December 28, 1835 (aged 65) Cincinnati, Ohio, U.S.
- Resting place: Spring Grove Cemetery in Cincinnati, Ohio, U.S.
- Party: Jacksonian; Whig
- Spouse: Jane Irwin

Military service
- Allegiance: United States
- Branch/service: United States Army
- Battles/wars: War of 1812

James B. Findlay (October 12, 1770 – December 28, 1835) was an American merchant, politician and veteran of the War of 1812, having served with both the state militia and the United States Army. He was based in Cincinnati, Ohio after migrating there as a young man. He was elected as mayor of Cincinnati to two non-successive terms.

For defenses in the War of 1812, he supervised construction of Fort Findlay, which was named for him. In 1824, he was elected to multiple terms in the US House of Representatives, serving from 1825 to 1833.

== Early life ==
Findlay was born in Mercersburg in the Province of Pennsylvania, to Samuel Findlay and Jane Smith. He had two older brothers, John and William. All three brothers became politicians: John Findlay served in the U.S. House of Representatives from Pennsylvania, and William Findlay served two separate periods as governor of Pennsylvania.

== Career ==
After their father suffered financial setbacks, Findlay moved to the Northwest Territory in 1793 with his wife Jane Irwin (1769–1851). There, in partnership with John Smith, he soon became a leading merchant and influential in the young city of Cincinnati. He was elected to the legislature of the Northwest Territory in 1798. In 1802, he was appointed as the United States Marshal for the Northwest Territory.

In 1800, Findlay was appointed as receiver of public money at the Cincinnati Public Land Office, as settlers arrived in the Northwest Territory seeking land. As such, he was the region's most visible federal official and a central figure in the business and politics of Cincinnati.

After statehood, he was elected in 1804 as mayor of Cincinnati, serving into 1806. He was re-elected in 1810, serving through 1811. Findlay participated in the Ohio state militia, attaining the rank of brigadier general.

In 1806 and 1807, Findlay helped to quash the Burr conspiracy. That required him to confront his partner Smith, an alleged conspirator. In the War of 1812, Findlay was commissioned as a colonel in the United States Army, and commanded the 2nd Ohio Volunteer Infantry. He marched north with General William Hull. He opposed Hull's disastrous decision to surrender Detroit. Afterward Findlay was promoted to major general in the Ohio militia, and built Fort Findlay in 1812, which was named for him. Present-day Findlay, Ohio developed around it.

Findlay was elected in 1824 to represent Ohio's 1st congressional district in the Nineteenth and Twentieth Congresses. He was next elected as a Jacksonian Democrat to the Twenty-first and Twenty-second Congresses, serving in total from March 4, 1825 – March 3, 1833. Findlay eventually broke with the Jackson Democrats.

He was defeated for reelection to the House in 1832. As an Anti-Jacksonian, he lost a bid for Governor of Ohio in 1834.

He died in Cincinnati in 1835 and was buried at Spring Grove Cemetery in Cincinnati.

== Legacy ==
Fort Findlay was named for him, as he had directed its construction.

The City of Findlay founded at the site of Fort Findlay is named after him.

Findlay Market and the adjacent Findlay Street are built on land donated to Cincinnati by the estate of General Findlay and his wife Jane Irwin Findlay.

Political offices
Preceded by Joseph Prince	Mayor of Cincinnati; 1805-1806	Succeeded by John S. Gano
Preceded by Daniel Symmes	Mayor of Cincinnati; 1810-1811	Succeeded by Martin Baum
Assembly seats
New district	Member of the Northwest Territory Legislative Council from Hamilton County; 1799–1802; Served alongside: Jacob Burnet	Ohio statehood
U.S. House of Representatives
Preceded by James W. Gazlay	Representative from Ohio's 1st congressional district 1825-03-04 – 1833-03-03	Succeeded by Robert Todd Lytle
Party political offices
First	Whig Party nominee for Governor of Ohio; 1834	Succeeded by Joseph Vance
