= Nathanael G. Pendleton =

American politician

Member of the U.S. House of Representatives from Ohio's 1st district
- In office March 4, 1841 – March 3, 1843
- Preceded by: Alexander Duncan
- Succeeded by: Alexander Duncan

Member of the Ohio Senate from Hamilton County
- In office December 5, 1825 – December 2, 1827
- Preceded by: Clayton Webb; Nathan Guilford
- Succeeded by: Stephen Wood; Andrew Mack

Personal details
- Born: Nathanael Greene Pendleton; August 25, 1793 Savannah, Georgia
- Died: June 16, 1861 (aged 67) Cincinnati, Ohio
- Resting place: Spring Grove Cemetery
- Party: Whig
- Education: Columbia College

Nathanael Greene Pendleton (August 25, 1793 – June 16, 1861) was a U.S. representative from Ohio, and the father of George Hunt Pendleton.

Born in Savannah, Georgia, August 25, 1793, he moved to New York City with his parents (Nathaniel Pendleton and Susan Bard Pendleton). Pendleton graduated from Columbia College at New York City in 1813. He studied law and was admitted to the bar. He served in the War of 1812. He moved to Cincinnati, Ohio, in 1818 and practiced law. He served as a member of the State senate 1825–1827.

Pendleton was elected as a Whig to the Twenty-seventh Congress (March 4, 1841 – March 3, 1843). He did not seek renomination in 1842. He died in Cincinnati, Ohio, June 16, 1861. He was interred in Spring Grove Cemetery.

His great-granddaughter Nathalie Schenck Laimbeer was a pioneering woman banker in New York in the 1910s and 1920s.

== Sources ==
- United States Congress. "Nathanael G. Pendleton (id: P000208)". Biographical Directory of the United States Congress.
- A Guide to the Pendleton Family Papers, 1775-1881

Ohio Senate
Preceded by Clayton Webb, Nathan Guilford	Senator from Hamilton County District; December 5, 1825-December 2, 1827; Served alongside: Clayton Webb (1825-1826), Stephen Wood (1826-1827)	Succeeded by Stephen Wood, Andrew Mack
U.S. House of Representatives
Preceded by Alexander Duncan	Member of the U.S. House of Representatives from Ohio's 1st congressional district 1841–1843	Succeeded by Alexander Duncan
