= William Cory =

William Cory may refer to:

- William Johnson Cory, poet
- William Wallace Cory, Canadian politician

== See also ==
- William Corry (disambiguation)
