= Ohio idea =

1868 American politicial proposal

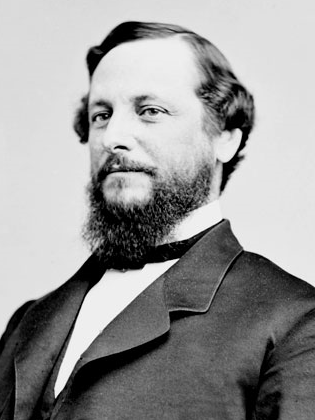
George H. Pendleton

The Ohio idea, also known as the Pendleton Plan, was an idea proposed by poor Midwesterners during the US presidential election of 1868. They wanted to redeem federal war bonds in United States dollars, also known as greenbacks, rather than gold. The idea was first introduced in 1867 in The Cincinnati Enquirer, a newspaper, and was later sponsored in Senate by Democrat George H. Pendleton. Democrats supported this in order to keep more money in circulation and thus keep interest rates lower. Moreover, they hoped to improve the political favourability of the Democratic Party by addressing popular issues. However, the idea was never implemented; it quickly died with the election of President Ulysses S. Grant and the federal bonds were reimbursed in gold through the Public Credit Act of 1869.

== Background ==
The Ohio idea was a product of the political issues regarding the circulation of money that largely characterized the late 19th century. At the time of its proposal, greenbacks had only recently been introduced with the Legal Tender Act of 1862, being the first fiat paper money made legal tender in the US. Many politicians were in opposition, claiming the act was unconstitutional. However, it was deemed necessary to be implemented in a time of emergency during the Civil War, as there was a severe shortage of money that otherwise only existed in the form of gold and silver coins. Greenbacks had free floating exchange rates and many of the government bonds sold during the civil war were not backed by gold. After the war ended, there were some politicians who persisted in their advocacy for the exclusive use of gold and silver as a currency, among which were Hugh McCulloch, Secretary of the Treasury at the time, and James A. Garfield, a Member of the House of Representatives, representing Ohio. McCulloch started a policy to withdraw greenbacks from circulation in an attempt to terminate the use of the currency, but this result was never achieved as they were still needed during the postwar recession.

Crucially, the use of greenbacks was widely supported in Ohio by then. The issue then was that the fluctuating money supply would influence inflation and midwestern farmers feared that contraction would cause crop prices to fall. Furthermore, most of the bonds were purchased in depreciated greenbacks, and rentiers would only take payment in gold, effectively putting a higher burden on poor agrarian and trades workers to pay the necessary tax money on top of their heavy debt. Their proposition, being the Ohio idea, was eagerly responded to by the Democratic Party, which decided to capitalize on this new issue to gain popularity among voters following its loss in the 1866 election.

=== Involvement of the Democratic Party ===
Seeing the emergence of a new popular voter issue, midwestern Democrats were quick to capitalize on it. After all, following its tremendous loss in the 1866 election, something sweeping was needed, and the Ohio idea was indeed sweeping; it simultaneously tackled the issue of public debt, prevented further contraction of the currency, and appealed to voters’ sense of justice as it highlighted the inequalities that came with the alternative. Since Pendleton held strong Jacksonian beliefs himself, the Ohio idea incorporated strong elements of Jacksonianism and emphasized the empowerment of the “common people” - that’s to say, those who could not afford to invest in government bonds but bore their financial weight nonetheless. Pendleton was not only the sponsor, but also the one who explained and promoted the idea to the general public in the first place through a variety of speeches. While initially being opposed to the Legal Tender Act, he began to advocate for the Ohio idea instead amidst the discussion of solutions among other Democrats, and many of his speeches addressed the inconsistency of his viewpoint and decision making. Voters elected a Democratic Party majority in the state legislature during the Election of 1867 in Ohio.

=== Result ===
Seeing as the Ohio idea was a major contributor to the success of the Democrats, the Republican Party decided that they also needed a clear stance on the issue. When it was used in the Democratic platform in the National Election of 1868, the Republican Party countered it by pledging to reimburse all bonds in gold. Afterwards, Ulysses S. Grant, the Republican representative, was elected, and in order to fulfill that campaign promise, the Public Credit Act of 1869 was passed in 1869, bringing an end to the Ohio idea.
