= John Woods (Ohio politician) =

American politician

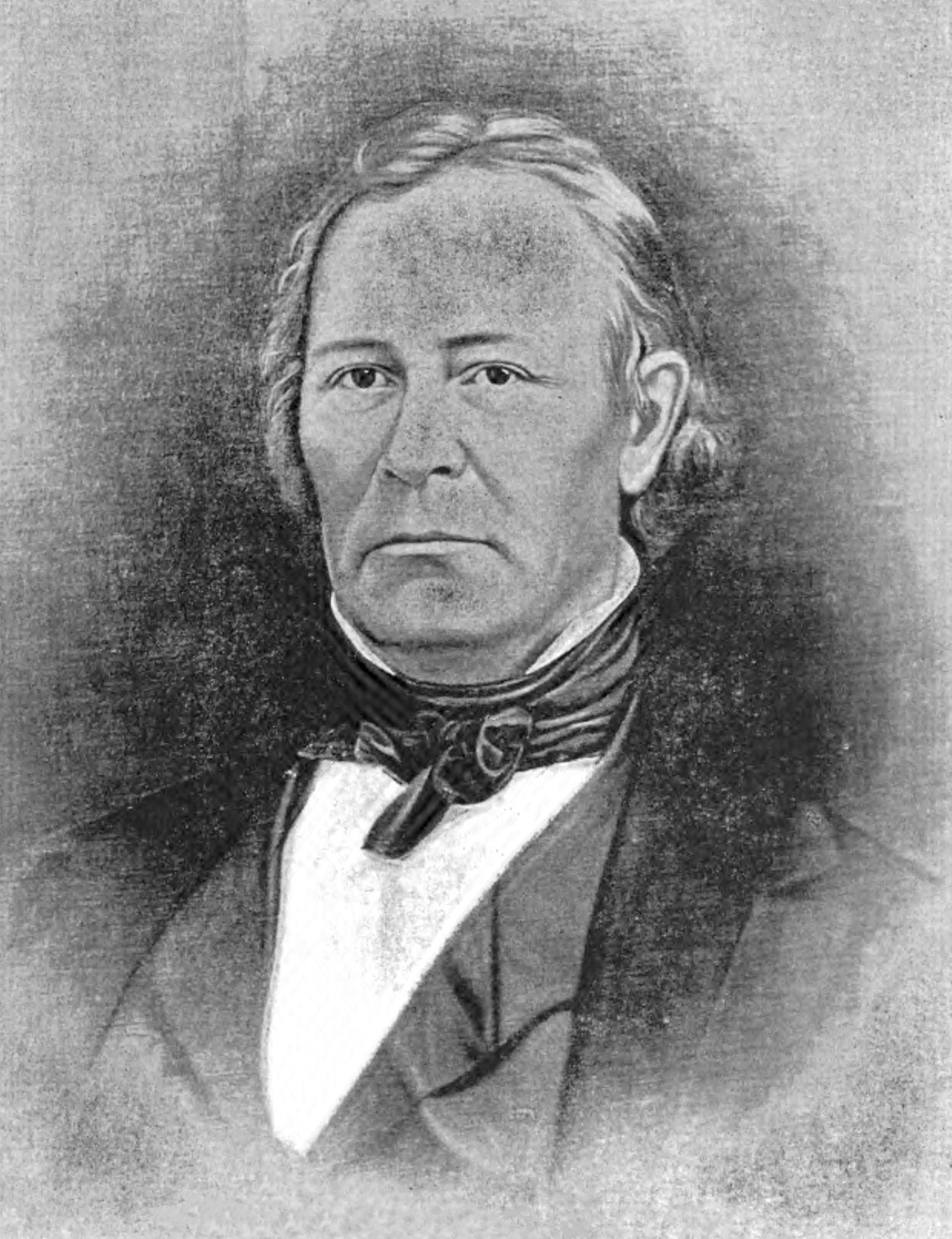

Member of the U.S. House of Representatives from Ohio's 2nd district
- In office March 4, 1825 – March 3, 1829
- Preceded by: Thomas R. Ross
- Succeeded by: James Shields

6th Ohio State Auditor
- In office 1845 – January 10, 1852
- Governor: Mordecai Bartley
- Preceded by: John Brough
- Succeeded by: William Duane Morgan

Personal details
- Born: October 18, 1794 Johnstown, Pennsylvania
- Died: July 30, 1855 (aged 60) Hamilton, Ohio
- Resting place: Greenwood Cemetery (Hamilton, Ohio)
- Party: Adams Party, Whig

John Woods (October 18, 1794 – July 30, 1855) was a 19th-century American lawyer, politician, and newspaperman who served two terms as a U.S. representative from Ohio from 1825 to 1829.

== Early life and education ==
Born in Johnstown, Pennsylvania, Woods moved with his parents to Ohio, where he attended the common schools. As a young man, he served in the War of 1812. After the war he operated a school near Springborough for two years.

== Career ==
Woods studied law, was admitted to the bar in 1819, and commenced the practice of his profession in Hamilton, Ohio. From 1820 to 1825, he served as prosecuting attorney of Butler County.

=== Congress ===
Woods was elected to the Nineteenth and Twentieth Congresses (March 4, 1825 – March 3, 1829). He was an unsuccessful candidate for re-election in 1828 to the Twenty-first Congress.

=== Later career ===
In 1829 he became editor and publisher of the Hamilton Intelligencer. He served as state auditor of Ohio from 1845 to 1852 as a Whig. Woods was also president of the Cincinnati, Hamilton and Indianapolis Railroad.

== Death ==
He died in Hamilton, Ohio on July 30, 1855. He was interred in Greenwood Cemetery.

== Sources ==
- United States Congress. "John Woods (id: W000724)". Biographical Directory of the United States Congress.

U.S. House of Representatives
Preceded by Thomas R. Ross	Member of the U.S. House of Representatives from Ohio's 2nd congressional district 1825-1829	Succeeded by James Shields
