= George H. Pendleton =

American lawyer, politician and businessman

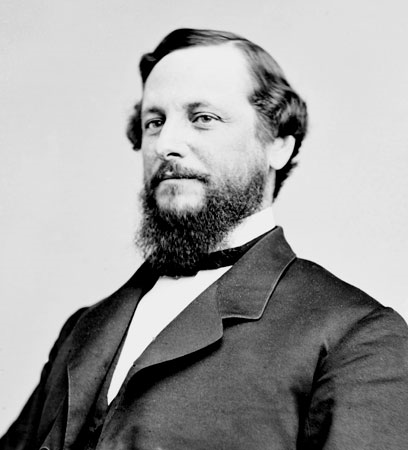

United States Minister to Germany
- In office June 21, 1885 – April 25, 1889
- President: Grover Cleveland; Benjamin Harrison
- Preceded by: John A. Kasson
- Succeeded by: William Phelps

Chairman of the Senate Democratic Caucus
- In office March 4, 1881 – March 3, 1885
- Preceded by: William A. Wallace
- Succeeded by: James B. Beck

United States Senator from Ohio
- In office March 4, 1879 – March 3, 1885
- Preceded by: Stanley Matthews
- Succeeded by: Henry B. Payne

Member of the U.S. House of Representatives from Ohio's 1st district
- In office March 4, 1857 – March 3, 1865
- Preceded by: Timothy C. Day
- Succeeded by: Benjamin Eggleston

Member of the Ohio Senate from the 1st district
- In office January 2, 1854 – January 6, 1856; Served with John Schiff, William Converse
- Preceded by: Edwin Armstrong; Adam Riddle; John Vattier
- Succeeded by: Stanley Matthews; George Holmes; William Converse

Personal details
- Born: George Hunt Pendleton; July 19, 1825 Cincinnati, Ohio, U.S.
- Died: November 24, 1889 (aged 64) Brussels, Belgium
- Resting place: Spring Grove Cemetery; Cincinnati, Ohio, U.S.
- Party: Democratic
- Spouse: Alice Key
- Parent(s): Jane Frances Hunt Pendleton; Nathanael Greene Pendleton
- Relatives: Francis Scott Key (father-in-law)
- Education: University of Cincinnati; Heidelberg University

George Hunt Pendleton (July 19, 1825 – November 24, 1889) was an American politician, lawyer and diplomat. He represented Ohio in both houses of Congress and was the Democratic nominee for Vice President of the United States in 1864.

After studying at the University of Cincinnati and Heidelberg University in Europe, Pendleton practiced law in his hometown of Cincinnati, Ohio. He was the son of Congressman Nathanael G. Pendleton and the son-in-law of poet Francis Scott Key. After serving in the Ohio Senate, Pendleton was elected to the United States House of Representatives. During the Civil War, he emerged as a leader of the Copperheads, a group of Democrats who favored peace with the Confederacy. After the war, he opposed the Thirteenth Amendment and the Civil Rights Act of 1866.

The 1864 Democratic National Convention nominated a ticket of George B. McClellan, who favored continuing the war, and Pendleton, who opposed it. The ticket lost to the National Union ticket of Abraham Lincoln and Andrew Johnson, and Pendleton's term as a Congressman expired shortly thereafter. Pendleton was a strong contender for the presidential nomination at the 1868 Democratic National Convention, but was defeated by New York Governor Horatio Seymour. After Pendleton lost the 1869 Ohio gubernatorial election, he temporarily left politics.

He served as the president of the Kentucky Central Railroad before returning to Congress. Pendleton was elected to the U.S. Senate in 1879 and served a single term, becoming Chairman of the Senate Democratic Conference. After the assassination of President James A. Garfield, he wrote and helped pass the Pendleton Civil Service Reform Act of 1883. The act required that many civil service hirings be based on merit rather than political connections. Passage of the act lost him support in Ohio and he was not nominated for a second Senate term. President Grover Cleveland appointed him ambassador to the German Empire. He served in that position until 1889, dying later that year.

== Early life ==
Pendleton was born in Cincinnati on July 19, 1825. He was the son of Jane Frances (née Hunt) Pendleton (1802–1839) and U.S. Representative Nathanael Greene Pendleton (1793–1861).

He attended the local schools and Cincinnati College and the University of Heidelberg in Germany. Pendleton studied law, was admitted to the bar in 1847, and commenced practice in Cincinnati.

== Career ==
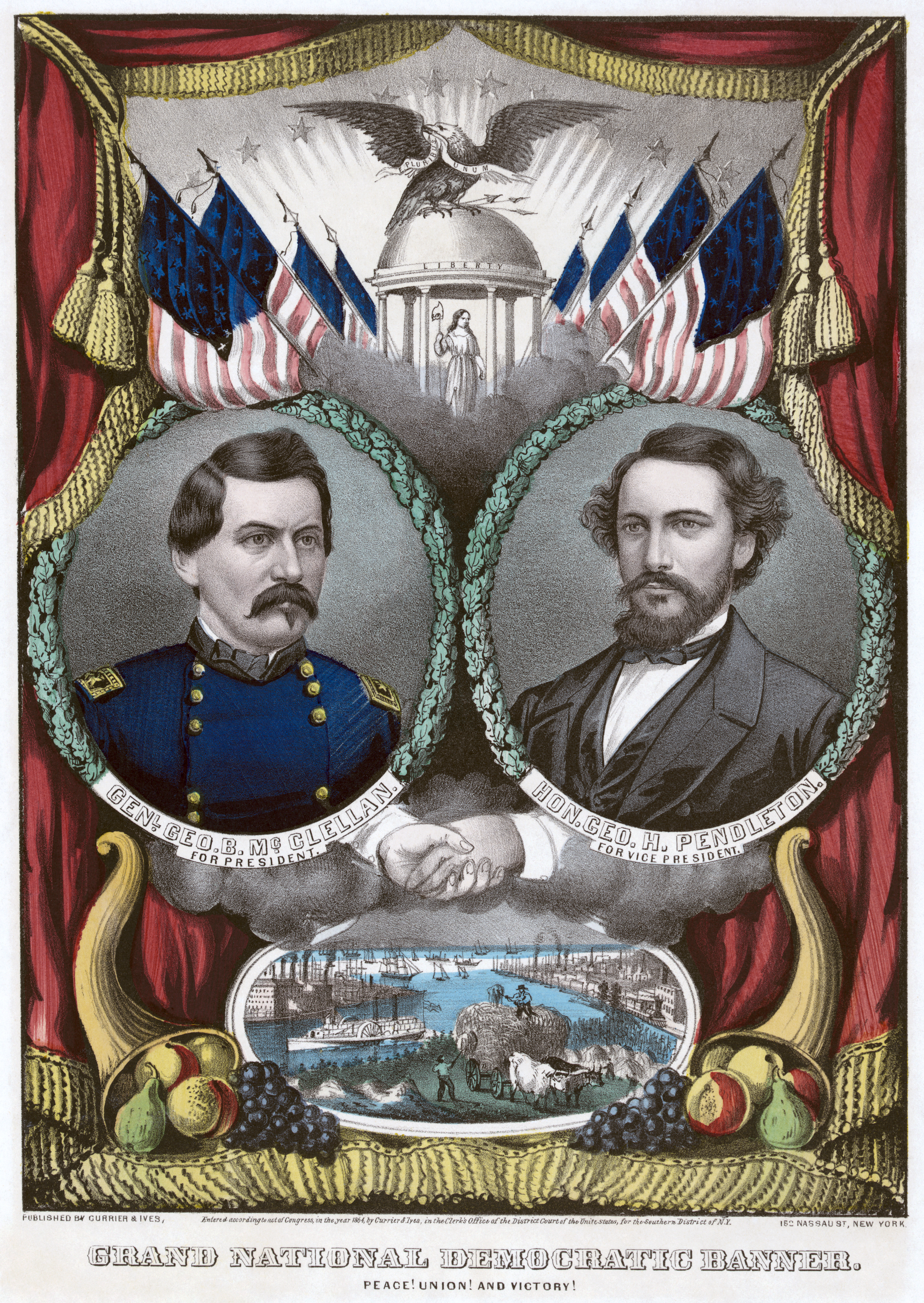
Currier and Ives print of the Democratic presidential party ticket, 1864. Lithograph with watercolor.

Pendleton was elected as a member of the Ohio Senate, serving from 1854 to 1856. His father had been a member of the Ohio Senate from 1825 until 1827. In 1854, he ran unsuccessfully for the Thirty-fourth United States Congress. Two years later, he was elected as a Democrat to the Thirty-fifth Congress. He was reelected to the three following Congresses (March 4, 1857 – March 3, 1865). During his time in the House, he was one of the managers appointed in 1862 to conduct the impeachment proceedings against West H. Humphreys, a US judge for several districts of Tennessee.

In the 1850s, Pendleton actively opposed measures to prohibit slavery in the Western United States. A leading defender of slavery, he was a leader of his party's "peace" faction during the Civil War, with close ties to the Copperheads. He voted against the Thirteenth Amendment, which outlawed slavery and involuntary servitude.

=== National politics ===
Pendleton, a nationally prominent Extreme Peace Democrat, was nominated as the vice-presidential running mate of George McClellan, a War Democrat, in the 1864 presidential election. McClellan, age 37 at the time of the convention, and Pendleton, age 39, are the youngest major-party presidential ticket ever nominated in the United States. Their National Union opponents were President Lincoln and Andrew Johnson. McClellan and Pendleton lost, receiving about 45% of the popular vote and less than 10% of the electoral vote.

Since Pendleton was the Democratic vice-presidential nominee, he was not a candidate for reelection to the Thirty-ninth Congress. George E. Pugh, the Democrat nominated to run for Pendleton's seat, lost to Republican Benjamin Eggleston.

=== Out of office ===
Out of office for the first time in a decade, Pendleton ran for his old House seat in 1866 but lost. In 1868, he sought the Democratic Party's presidential nomination. He led for the first 15 ballots but his support disappeared and he lost to Horatio Seymour, primarily for his support of the "Ohio idea." In 1869, he was the Democratic nominee for Governor of Ohio and lost to Rutherford B. Hayes.

Pendleton stepped away from politics, and in 1869, he became president of the Kentucky Central Railroad.

=== Political comeback ===
In 1879, Pendleton was elected to the United States Senate. During his only term, from 1881 to 1885, he served concurrently as the Chairman of the Democratic Conference. Following the 1881 assassination of James A. Garfield, he passed his most notable legislation, the Pendleton Act of 1883, requiring civil service exams for government positions. The Act helped put an end to the system of patronage in widespread use at the time, but it cost Pendleton politically, as many members of his party preferred the spoils system. He was thus not renominated to the Senate.

=== Later life ===
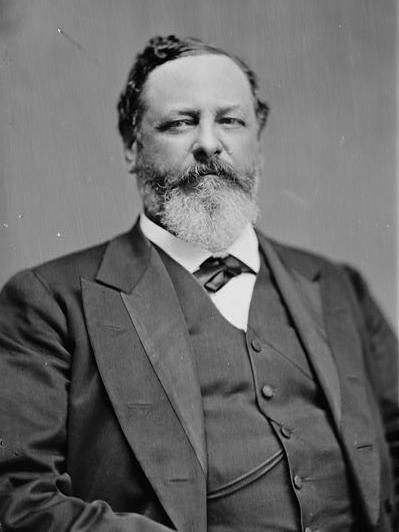
Pendleton in his later years.

President Grover Cleveland appointed Pendleton Envoy Extraordinary and Minister Plenipotentiary to Germany the year he left office. He served until April 1889. Five months later, during his return trip to the United States, he died in Brussels, Belgium.

=== Beliefs ===
Pendleton had a very Jacksonian commitment to the Democratic Party as the best and perhaps only mechanism through which ordinary Americans could shape government policies. Mach (2007) argues that Pendleton's chief contribution was to demonstrate the Whig Party's willingness to use its power in government to achieve Jacksonian ideals.

While his Jacksonian commitment to states' rights and limited government made him a dissenter during the Civil War, what Mach calls Pendleton's Jacksonian "ardor to expand opportunities for ordinary Americans" was the basis for his leadership in civil service reform and his controversial plan to use greenbacks to repay the federal debt. What appeared to be a substantive ideological shift, Mach argues, represented Pendleton's pragmatic willingness to use new means to achieve old ends.

== Personal life ==
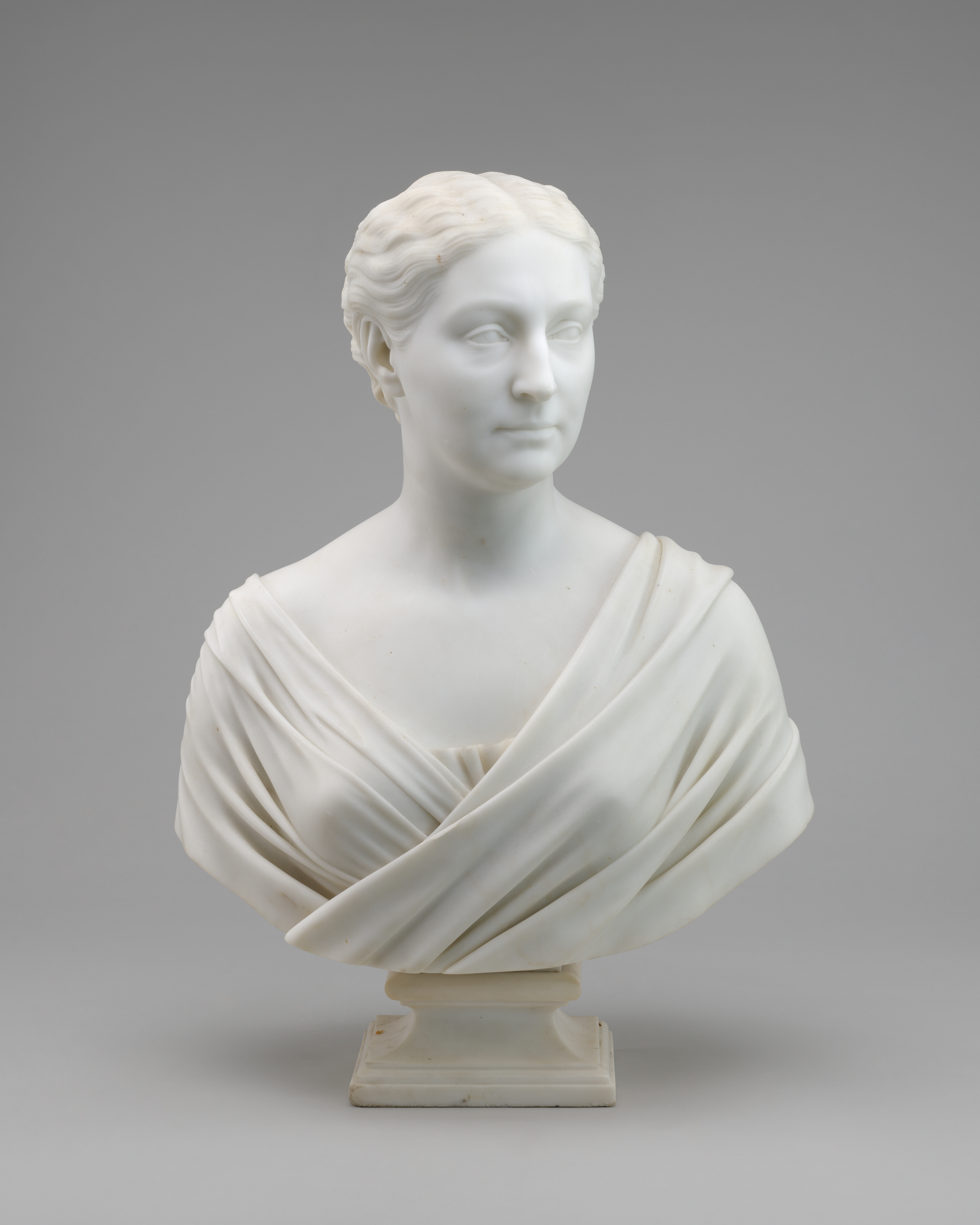
Alice Key Pendleton, sculpted by Hiram Powers

In 1846, Pendleton married Mary Alicia Key, the daughter of Francis Scott Key, the lawyer, author, and amateur poet best known for writing the poem that later became the lyrics of the United States' national anthem, "The Star-Spangled Banner." George and Alicia were the parents of:

- Sarah Pendleton (born in Ireland, about 1846)
- Francis Key Pendleton (1850–1930), who was born in Cincinnati and became prominent in New York society during the Gilded Age.
- Mary Lloyd Pendleton (1852–1929), who was born in Cincinnati.
- Jane Francis Pendleton (1860–1950), who was born in the District of Columbia, April 22, 1860.
- George Hunt Pendleton (1863–1868)

Pendleton became a member of the New York Society of the Cincinnati in 1886 by right of his descent from Captain Nathaniel Pendleton of the Continental Army.

At the end of his life, Pendleton suffered a stroke. He died in Brussels, Belgium, on November 24, 1889. He is interred in Spring Grove Cemetery, Cincinnati, Ohio.

=== Memorials ===
The city of Pendleton, Oregon, is named after him.

The George H. Pendleton House in Cincinnati is a National Historical Landmark and was listed on the National Register of Historic Places in 1966.

== In popular culture ==
In Steven Spielberg's 2012 film Lincoln, Pendleton is played by Peter McRobbie and portrayed as one of the most notable opponents of the Thirteenth Amendment and the Civil Rights Act of 1866.

== Sources ==
- Mach, Thomas S. "Gentleman George" Hunt Pendleton: Party Politics and Ideological Identity in Nineteenth-Century America, Kent State University Press, 2007, ISBN 978-0-87338-913-6, 317 pp. excerpt; also online review
  - PhD dissertation version

Ohio Senate
Preceded by Edwin Armstrong; Adam Riddle; John Vattier	Member of the Ohio Senate from the 1st district 1854–1856; Served alongside: John Schiff, William Converse	Succeeded by Stanley Matthews; George Holmes; William Converse
U.S. House of Representatives
Preceded by Timothy C. Day	Member of the U.S. House of Representatives from Ohio's 1st congressional district 1857–1865	Succeeded by Benjamin Eggleston
Party political offices
Preceded by Herschel Johnson^{(1)} Joseph Lane	Democratic nominee for Vice President of the United States; 1864	Succeeded by Francis Blair
Preceded by Allen G. Thurman	Democratic nominee for Governor of Ohio; 1869	Succeeded by George Wythe McCook
Preceded by William A. Wallace	Chair of the Senate Democratic Caucus; 1881–1885	Succeeded by James B. Beck
U.S. Senate
Preceded by Stanley Matthews	U.S. Senator (Class 3) from Ohio; 1879–1885; Served alongside: Allen G. Thurman, John Sherman	Succeeded by Henry B. Payne
Diplomatic posts
Preceded by John A. Kasson	United States Ambassador to Germany; 1885–1889	Succeeded by William Phelps
Notes and references
1. The Democratic Party split in 1860, producing two vice presidential candidates. Johnson was nominated by Northern Democrats; Lane was nominated by Southern Democrats.
