= Milton Sayler =

American politician

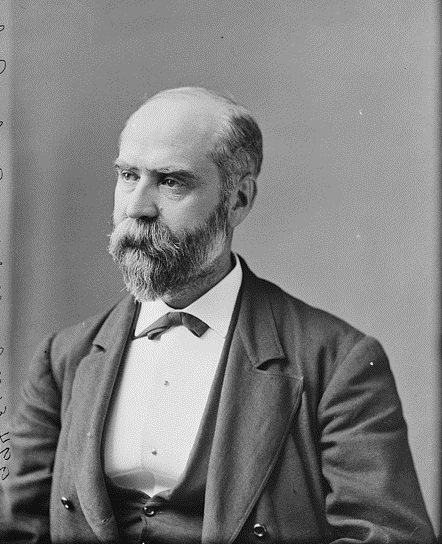

Member of the U.S. House of Representatives from Ohio's 1st district
- In office March 4, 1873 – March 3, 1879
- Preceded by: Ozro J. Dodds
- Succeeded by: Benjamin Butterworth

Member of the Ohio House of Representatives from the Hamilton County district
- In office January 6, 1862 – January 3, 1864 Serving with eight others
- Preceded by: seven others
- Succeeded by: ten others

Personal details
- Born: November 4, 1831 Lewisburg, Ohio
- Died: November 17, 1892 (aged 61) New York City
- Resting place: Spring Grove Cemetery
- Party: Democratic
- Alma mater: Miami University; Cincinnati Law School

Milton Sayler (November 4, 1831 – November 17, 1892) was an American lawyer and politician who served as a three-term U.S. representative from Ohio from 1873 to 1879. He was a cousin of Henry B. Sayler, who served in the U.S. Congress, representing Indiana.

== Early life and career ==
Born in Lewisburg, Ohio, Sayler attended the public schools. He pursued classical studies and was graduated from Miami University, Oxford, Ohio, in 1852. He studied law at the Cincinnati Law School. He was admitted to the bar and commenced practice in Cincinnati, Ohio.

== Political career ==
He served as member of the Ohio House of Representatives in 1862 and 1863. He served as member of the Cincinnati City Council in 1864 and 1865.

== Congress ==
Sayler was elected as a Democrat to the Forty-third, Forty-fourth, and Forty-fifth Congresses (March 4, 1873 – March 3, 1879). He served as chairman of the Committee on Public Lands (Forty-fourth Congress). He was an unsuccessful candidate for reelection in 1878 to the Forty-sixth Congress.

== Later career and death ==
He moved to New York City and resumed the practice of his profession. He died in that city November 17, 1892. He was interred in Spring Grove Cemetery, Cincinnati, Ohio.

== Sources ==
- United States Congress. "Milton Sayler (id: S000101)". Biographical Directory of the United States Congress.

U.S. House of Representatives
Preceded by Ozro J. Dodds	Member of the U.S. House of Representatives from Ohio's 1st congressional district 1873-1879	Succeeded by Benjamin Butterworth
