= Benjamin Eggleston =

American politician

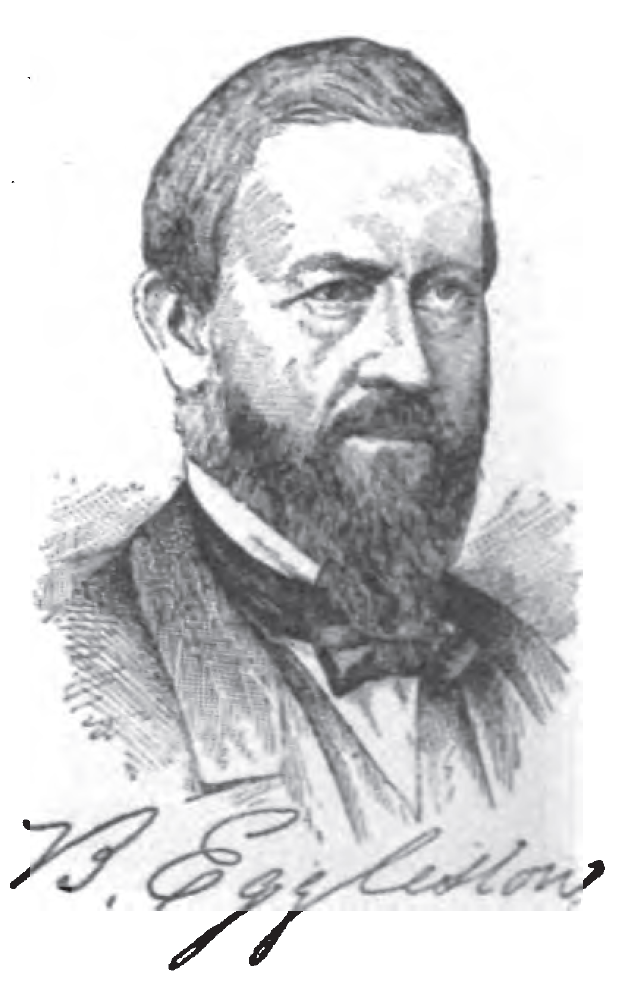

Member of the U.S. House of Representatives from Ohio's 1st district
- In office March 4, 1865 – March 3, 1869
- Preceded by: George H. Pendleton
- Succeeded by: Peter W. Strader

Member of the Ohio Senate from the 1st district
- In office January 6, 1862 – March 3, 1865 Serving with Thomas H. Whetstone; William S. Groesbeck; Joshua H. Bates
- Preceded by: Thomas W. Key; George W. Holmes; E. A. Ferguson
- Succeeded by: W. M. Bateman; S. L. Hayden
- In office January 5, 1880 – January 1, 1882 Serving with Charles Fleishman; Josiah Kirby
- Preceded by: William T. Forrest; James M. Armstrong; Henry C. Lord; Theodore Marsh
- Succeeded by: W. M. Yeatman; Lewis Balluf; Julius Dexter

Personal details
- Born: January 3, 1816 Corinth, New York, U.S.
- Died: February 9, 1888 (aged 72) Cincinnati, Ohio, U.S.
- Resting place: Spring Grove Cemetery
- Party: Republican

Benjamin Eggleston (January 3, 1816 – February 9, 1888) was a U.S. representative from Ohio.

== Life and career ==
Born in Corinth, New York, Eggleston completed preparatory studies. He moved with his parents to Hocking County, Ohio, in 1831. He moved to Cleveland and worked on a canal boat, later becoming an owner of boats and interested in several companies. He settled in Cincinnati in 1845 and engaged in mercantile pursuits. He was elected presiding officer of the city council of Cincinnati. He served as delegate to the Republican National Convention in 1860. Presidential elector for Lincoln/Hamlin in 1860. He served as member of the Ohio Senate 1862–1865.

Eggleston was elected as a Republican to the Thirty-ninth and Fortieth Congresses (March 4, 1865 – March 3, 1869). He was an unsuccessful candidate for reelection in 1868 to the Forty-first Congress. He again served in the Ohio Senate in 1880 and 1881. He resumed mercantile pursuits. He died in Cincinnati, Ohio, February 9, 1888. He was interred in Spring Grove Cemetery.

== Sources ==
- United States Congress. "Benjamin Eggleston (id: E000090)". Biographical Directory of the United States Congress.

- Smith, Joseph P, ed. (1898). History of the Republican Party in Ohio. Vol. I. Chicago: the Lewis Publishing Company.

U.S. House of Representatives
| Preceded by George H. Pendleton | Member of the U.S. House of Representatives from Ohio's 1st congressional district 1857–1865 | Succeeded by Peter W. Strader |
