= Peter W. Strader =

American politician

Peter Wilson Strader
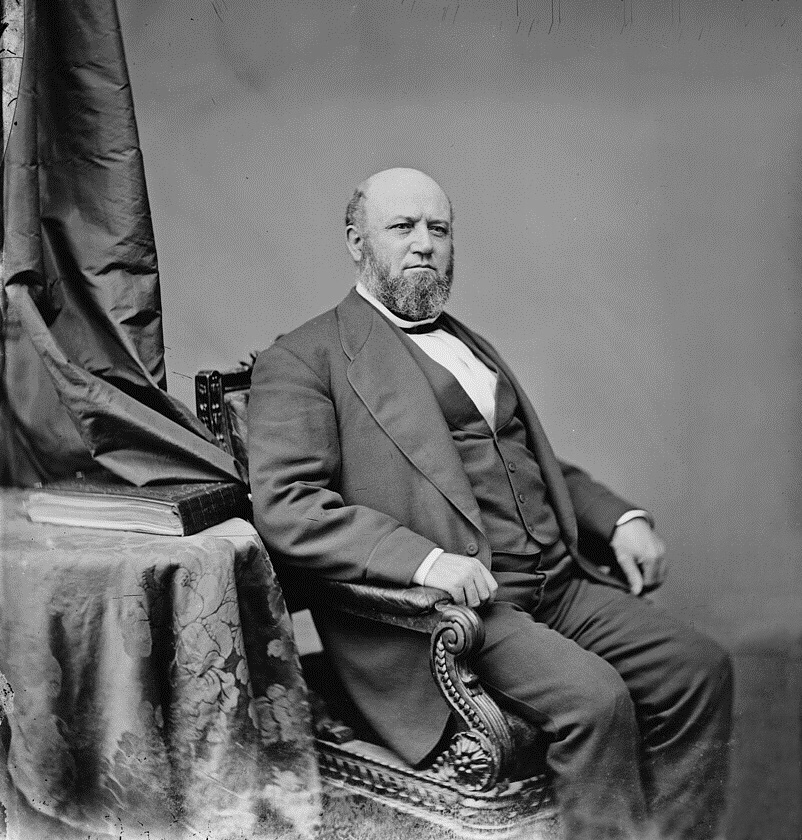

Member of the U.S. House of Representatives from Ohio's 1st district
- In office March 4, 1869 – March 3, 1871
- Preceded by: Benjamin Eggleston
- Succeeded by: Aaron F. Perry

Personal details
- Born: November 6, 1818 New Jersey
- Died: February 25, 1881 (aged 62) Ashtabula, Ohio
- Resting place: Spring Grove Cemetery
- Party: Democratic

Peter Wilson Strader (November 6, 1818 – February 25, 1881) was an American politician who served one term as a U.S. representative from Ohio from 1869 to 1871.

== Biography ==
Born in Shawnee, New Jersey, Strader moved with his parents to Lebanon, Ohio, in 1819. He attended the common schools. He worked in a printing office for three years. He moved to Cincinnati, Ohio, in 1835. Connected with the steamboat interests on the Ohio and Mississippi Rivers as a clerk and an engineer 1835–1848. He served as general ticket agent of the Little Miami Railroad 1848–1867.

== Congress ==
Strader was elected as a Democrat to the Forty-first Congress (March 4, 1869 – March 3, 1871). He was not a candidate for renomination in 1870.

== Later career and death ==
He resumed his former business interests. He moved to Ashtabula, Ohio, in 1876, where he died February 25, 1881. He was interred in Spring Grove Cemetery, Cincinnati, Ohio.

== Sources ==
- United States Congress. "Peter W. Strader (id: S000987)". Biographical Directory of the United States Congress.

U.S. House of Representatives
Preceded by Benjamin Eggleston	Member of the U.S. House of Representatives from Ohio's 1st congressional district 1869–1871	Succeeded by Aaron F. Perry
