= Bellamy Storer (Ohio politician) =

American politician (1796–1875)

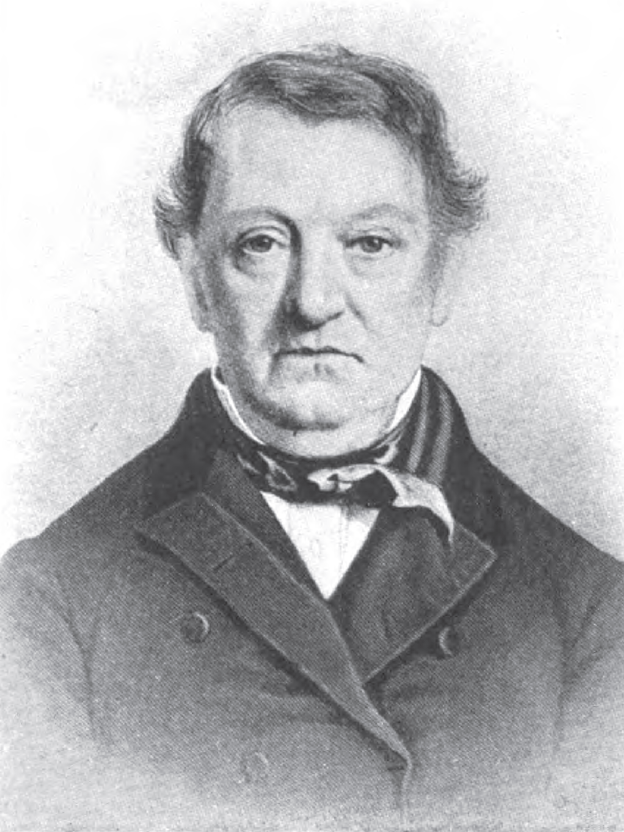

Member of the U.S. House of Representatives from Ohio's 1st district
- In office March 4, 1835 – March 3, 1837
- Preceded by: Robert Todd Lytle
- Succeeded by: Alexander Duncan

Personal details
- Born: March 26, 1796 Portland, Massachusetts (now Maine)
- Died: June 1, 1875 (aged 79) Cincinnati, Ohio
- Resting place: Spring Grove Cemetery
- Party: Anti-Jacksonian
- Children: Bellamy Storer
- Education: Bowdoin College

Bellamy Storer (March 26, 1796 – June 1, 1875) was a U.S. representative from Ohio, father of Bellamy Storer (1847).

Born in Portland in Massachusetts' District of Maine, Storer attended private schools in his native city. He entered Bowdoin College in Brunswick in 1809. He studied law in Boston. He was admitted to the bar in Portland in 1817 and commenced practice in Cincinnati, Ohio, the same year.

Storer was elected as an Anti-Jacksonian to the Twenty-fourth Congress (March 4, 1835 – March 3, 1837). He declined to be a candidate for renomination in 1836 to the Twenty-fifth Congress, taking a job as a professor in Cincinnati Law School 1855–1874. He was a Whig Presidential elector in 1844 for Clay/Frelinghuysen. He was nominated by the Whigs in 1851 for the Ohio Supreme Court, but lost. He served as judge of the superior court of Cincinnati from its organization in 1854 until 1872, when he resigned. He resumed the practice of law, and died in Cincinnati, Ohio, on June 1, 1875. He was interred in Spring Grove Cemetery.

He was a trustee of Ohio University beginning in 1866. A bust of Storer was sculpted by Moses Jacob Ezekiel.

== Sources ==
- United States Congress. "Bellamy Storer (id: S000971)". Biographical Directory of the United States Congress.
- Taylor, William Alexander; Taylor, Aubrey Clarence (1899). Ohio statesmen and annals of progress: from the year 1788 to the year 1900 ... Vol. 1. State of Ohio. p. 255.
- Reed, George Irving; Randall, Emilius Oviatt; Greve, Charles Theodore, eds. (1897). Bench and Bar of Ohio: a Compendium of History and Biography. Vol. 1. Chicago: Century Publishing and Engraving Company. pp. 113–114.
- Walker, Charles M (1869). History of Athens County, Ohio And Incidentally of the Ohio Land Company and the First Settlement of the State at Marietta etc. Robert Clarke & Co. pp. 346–348. ISBN 9780608396323.

U.S. House of Representatives
Preceded by Robert Todd Lytle	Member of the U.S. House of Representatives from Ohio's 1st congressional district 1835–1837	Succeeded by Alexander Duncan
