= Thomas R. Ross =

American politician (1788–1869)

Member of the U.S. House of Representatives from Ohio
- In office March 4, 1819 – March 3, 1825
- Preceded by: William Henry Harrison
- Succeeded by: John Woods
- Constituency: 1st district (1819–1823); 2nd district (1823–1825)

Personal details
- Born: Thomas Randolph Ross; October 26, 1788 New Garden Township, Pennsylvania
- Died: June 28, 1869 (aged 80) Lebanon, Ohio
- Resting place: Lebanon Cemetery
- Party: Democratic-Republican

Thomas Randolph Ross (October 26, 1788 – June 28, 1869) was a 19th-Century American lawyer and politician who served three terms as United States representative from Ohio from 1819 to 1825.

== Biography ==
Born in New Garden Township, Pennsylvania, Ross completed preparatory studies. He studied law, was admitted to the bar, and began practice in Lebanon, Ohio, in 1810.

=== Congress ===
Ross was elected as a Republican to the Sixteenth and Seventeenth Congresses and reelected as a Crawford Republican to the Eighteenth Congress (March 4, 1819 – March 3, 1825). He served as chairman of the Committee on Revisal and Unfinished Business (Seventeenth and Eighteenth Congresses). He was an unsuccessful candidate for reelection in 1824 to the Nineteenth Congress.

He resumed the practice of law in Lebanon. He lost his eyesight in 1866.

=== Death and burial ===
He died on his farm near Lebanon, Ohio, June 28, 1869, and was interred in Lebanon Cemetery.

His brother-in-law was former Ohio Governor Thomas Corwin, who married Ross's sister Sarah.

== Sources ==
- United States Congress. "Thomas R. Ross (id: R000456)". Biographical Directory of the United States Congress.

U.S. House of Representatives
Preceded by William Henry Harrison	Representative from Ohio's 1st congressional district 1819-03-04 – 1823	Succeeded by James W. Gazlay
Preceded by John Wilson Campbell	Representative from Ohio's 2nd congressional district 1823–1825-03-03	Succeeded by John Woods
