= Timothy C. Day =

American politician

Timothy Crane Day
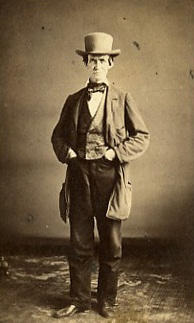

Member of the U.S. House of Representatives from Ohio's first district
- In office March 4, 1855 – March 3, 1857
- Preceded by: David T. Disney
- Succeeded by: George H. Pendleton

Personal details
- Born: January 8, 1819 Cincinnati, Ohio, US
- Died: April 15, 1869 (aged 50) Cincinnati, Ohio, US
- Resting place: Spring Grove Cemetery
- Party: Anti-Nebraska

Timothy Crane Day (January 8, 1819 – April 15, 1869) was a U.S. representative from Ohio.

Born in Cincinnati, Ohio, Day attended the public schools. Day worked as a printer and engraver from 1838 to 1840. When his older brother died in 1850, he took his job as one of the editors and proprietors of the Cincinnati Enquirer. He disposed of his interests in the paper in 1852 and subsequently toured Europe.

Day was elected to the Thirty-fourth Congress (March 4, 1855 – March 3, 1857). Day ran as an Anti-Nebraska, or anti-slavery, candidate. He declined renomination in 1856 because of ill health and retired from active business. Day endowed the Ohio Mechanics Institute toward establishing a permanent library. When this library closed, the bequest was transferred to the University of Cincinnati's College of Applied Science in 1911 and bears his name as the Timothy C. Day Technical Library. He died in Cincinnati, Ohio, April 15, 1869. He was interred in Spring Grove Cemetery.

U.S. House of Representatives
| Preceded by David T. Disney | Member of the U.S. House of Representatives from Ohio's 1st congressional district 1855–1857 | Succeeded by George H. Pendleton |
