= James Shields (Ohio politician) =

Irish-American politician

Member of the U.S. House of Representatives from Ohio's 2nd district
- In office March 4, 1829 – March 3, 1831
- Preceded by: John Woods
- Succeeded by: Thomas Corwin

Member of the Ohio House of Representatives from Butler County
- In office 1821–1823
- Preceded by: Robert Anderson; James Clark; Joel Collins
- Succeeded by: James Clark; David Higgins; Marsh Williams
- In office 1819–1820
- Preceded by: Robert Anderson; Joel Collins; William Murray
- Succeeded by: Robert Anderson; James Clark; Joel Collins
- In office 1811–1818
- Preceded by: James Clark; James Heaton; John C. Imlay
- Succeeded by: Robert Anderson; Joel Collins; William Murray
- In office 1808–1810
- Preceded by: William Corry; James McClure
- Succeeded by: James Clark; James Heaton; John C. Imlay
- In office 1806–1807
- Preceded by: James McClure; Matthew Richardson
- Succeeded by: William Corry; James McClure

Personal details
- Born: April 13, 1762 Banbridge, County Down, Kingdom of Ireland
- Died: August 13, 1831 (aged 69) Venice, Ohio, U.S.
- Resting place: Venice Cemetery
- Party: Jacksonian
- Education: University of Glasgow

James Shields (April 13, 1762 – August 13, 1831) was a one-term U.S. Representative from Ohio, serving from 1829 to 1831.

== Biography ==
A descendant of the Ó Siadhail family, Shields was born in Banbridge, County Down, in the Kingdom of Ireland.

He received a good common-school education, entering the University of Glasgow, Scotland, in 1782 and graduated in 1786. He attended medical college for two years, before emigrating to the United States in July 1791 and settled in Frederick County, Virginia, where he taught school. He moved to Butler County, Ohio, in 1801, but then returned to Virginia and became a citizen of the United States in 1804.

=== Political career ===
He returned to Ohio in 1807 and was a member of the Ohio House of Representatives between 1806 and 1827 and was an elector for Andrew Jackson in 1828. He was elected as a Jacksonian to the 21st United States Congress (March 4, 1829 – March 3, 1831).

=== Death ===
Shields was killed through the accidental overturning of a stagecoach near Venice, Butler County, Ohio, on August 13, 1831. He was interred in Venice Cemetery, Venice, Ohio. He was the uncle of U.S. Senator James Shields.

Ohio House of Representatives
Preceded by James McClure; Matthew Richardson	Representative from Butler County; 1806–1807; Served alongside: Solomon Line	Succeeded by William Corry; James McClure
Preceded by William Corry; James McClure	Representative from Butler County; 1808–1810; Served alongside: James Heaton, William Murray	Succeeded by James Clark; James Heaton; John C. Imlay
Preceded by James Clark; James Heaton; John C. Imlay	Representative from Butler County; 1811–1818; Served alongside: Robert Anderson (1817–1818), Joel Collins (1817–1818), John C. Imlay (1811–1816), William Ludlow (1811–1812), Daniel Millikin (1816–1817), Charles Swearingen (1812–1817)	Succeeded by Robert Anderson; Joel Collins; William Murray
Preceded by Robert Anderson; Joel Collins; William Murray	Representative from Butler County; 1819–1820; Served alongside: Robert Anderson, Joel Collins	Succeeded by Robert Anderson; James Clark; Joel Collins
Preceded by Robert Anderson; James Clark; Joel Collins	Representative from Butler County; 1821–1823; Served alongside: Robert Anderson (1821–1822), Joel Collins (1821–1823), James McBride (1822–1823)	Succeeded by James Clark; David Higgins; Marsh Williams
U.S. House of Representatives
Preceded by John Woods	United States Representative from Ohio's 2nd congressional district 1829-03-04 – 1831-03-03	Succeeded by Thomas Corwin
