= James W. Gazlay =

American politician

Member of the U.S. House of Representatives from Ohio's 1st district
- In office March 4, 1823 – March 3, 1825
- Preceded by: Thomas R. Ross
- Succeeded by: James Findlay

Personal details
- Born: James William Gazlay; July 23, 1784 New York City, US
- Died: June 8, 1874 (aged 89) Cincinnati, Ohio, US
- Resting place: Spring Grove Cemetery
- Party: Democratic-Republican

James William Gazlay (July 23, 1784 – June 8, 1874) was an American lawyer and politician who served as a U.S. representative from Ohio for one term from 1823 to 1825.

== Biography ==
Born in New York City, Gazlay moved with his parents to Dutchess County, New York, in 1789. He attended the common schools, after which he pursued an academic course. He studied law in Poughkeepsie, New York. He was admitted to the bar in 1809 and practiced. He moved to Cincinnati, Ohio, in 1813 and continued the practice of law.

=== Congress ===
Gazlay was elected as a Jackson Republican to the Eighteenth Congress (March 4, 1823 – March 3, 1825). His opponent was Ohio State Senator and future President William Henry Harrison. He was an unsuccessful candidate for reelection in 1824 to the Nineteenth Congress.

=== Later career ===
He edited a weekly paper called the Western Tiller in 1826 and 1827. He engaged in literary pursuits.

=== Death and burial ===
He died in Cincinnati, Ohio, June 8, 1874. He was interred in Spring Grove Cemetery.

== Sources ==
- United States Congress. "James W. Gazlay (id: G000109)". Biographical Directory of the United States Congress.

U.S. House of Representatives
Preceded by Thomas R. Ross	Member of the U.S. House of Representatives from Ohio's 1st congressional district 1823–1825	Succeeded by James Findlay
