= David T. Disney =

American politician (1803–1857)

David Tiernan Disney
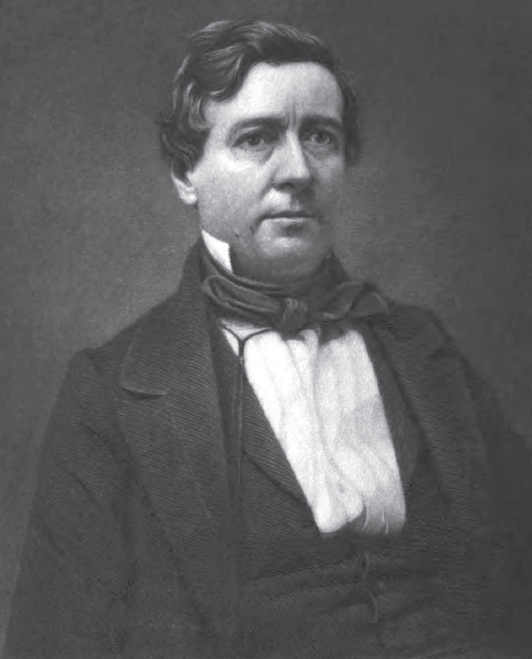

Member of the U.S. House of Representatives from Ohio's 1st district
- In office March 4, 1849 – March 3, 1855
- Preceded by: James J. Faran
- Succeeded by: Timothy C. Day

19th Speaker of the Ohio State Senate
- In office December 2, 1833 – November 30, 1834
- Preceded by: Samuel R. Miller
- Succeeded by: Peter Hitchcock

24th Speaker of the Ohio House of Representatives
- In office December 3, 1832 – December 1, 1833
- Preceded by: William Blackstone Hubbard
- Succeeded by: John H. Keith

Member of the Ohio Senate
- In office 1833-1834; 1843-1844

Member of the Ohio House of Representatives
- In office 1829; 1831-1832

Personal details
- Born: August 25, 1803 Baltimore, Maryland
- Died: March 14, 1857 (aged 53) Washington, D.C.
- Resting place: Spring Grove Cemetery
- Party: Democratic

David Tiernan Disney (August 25, 1803 – March 14, 1857) was a U.S. representative from Ohio for three terms from 1849 to 1855. He also served as speaker of both the Ohio State Senate and the Ohio House of Representatives.

== Early life and career ==
David Disney was born in Baltimore, Maryland, but moved to Ohio in 1807 where he spent most of his life. After he was admitted to the bar and commenced practice in Cincinnati.

=== State legislature ===
He served as member of the Ohio House of Representatives in 1829, 1831, and 1832, serving as speaker for the 1832-33 session. After his last term in the house, he moved over to the Ohio State Senate, where he was immediately elected Speaker of the Senate (the predecessor position to the President of the Senate), in 1833. He was elected for another term in 1834, and would serve two more in 1843 and 1844. He served as delegate to the Democratic National Convention in 1848 where Lewis Cass was nominated for President.

== Congress ==
Disney was elected as a Democrat to the Thirty-first, Thirty-second, and Thirty-third Congresses, and served as chairman of the Committee on Elections (Thirty-second Congress), Committee on Public Lands (Thirty-third Congress). He was an unsuccessful candidate for renomination in 1854.

== Death ==
He died in Washington, D.C., on March 14, 1857. He was interred in Spring Grove Cemetery, Cincinnati, Ohio.

== Sources ==
- United States Congress. "David T. Disney (id: D000361)". Biographical Directory of the United States Congress.

U.S. House of Representatives
Preceded by James J. Faran	United States Representative from Ohio's 1st congressional district 1849–1855	Succeeded by Timothy C. Day
Ohio House of Representatives
Preceded by Elijah Hayward; Alexander Duncan; Robert Todd Lytle	Representative from Hamilton County; 1829-1830; Served alongside: Samuel Reese; Alexander Duncan; George Graham	Succeeded by Samuel Reese; Daniel Stone; Leonard Armstrong
Preceded by Samuel Reese; Daniel Stone; Leonard Armstrong	Representative from Hamilton County; 1831-1833; Served alongside: John Burgoyne; Alexander Duncan; Daniel H. Hawes; Adam N. Riddle; Samuel Bond; Israel Brown	Succeeded by Adam N. Riddle; W. C. Anderson; Samuel Bond; John Burgoyne
Preceded by William B. Hubbard	Speaker of the House; 1832-1833	Succeeded by John H. Keith
Ohio Senate
Preceded by Alexander Duncan; Samuel R. Miller	Senator from Hamilton County; 1833-1835; Served alongside: Alexander Duncan	Succeeded by Henry Morse; William Price
Preceded by Oliver Jones; James J. Faran	Senator from Hamilton County; 1843-1845; Served alongside: Oliver Jones	Succeeded by Oliver Jones; James H. Ewing
Preceded by Samuel R. Miller	Speaker of the Senate; 1833-1834	Succeeded by Peter Hitchcock
