= Elijah Hayward =

American judge

5th Commissioner of the General Land Office
- In office September 30, 1830 – July 24, 1835
- Preceded by: George Graham
- Succeeded by: Ethan Allen Brown

Personal details
- Born: November 17, 1786 Bridgewater, Massachusetts, US
- Died: September 22, 1864 (aged 77) McConnelsville, Ohio, US
- Resting place: McConnelsville Cemetery
- Party: Democratic
- Spouse: Eliza Kingman

Elijah Hayward (November 17, 1786 – September 22, 1864) was a lawyer in the U.S. State of Ohio who represented his county in the Ohio House of Representatives, sat on the Ohio Supreme Court for a short time, and was Commissioner of the United States General Land Office. He was a noted genealogist and historian.

== Early life ==
Elijah Hayward was born in 1786 in Bridgewater, Plymouth County, Massachusetts. He was descended from Thomas Hayward, one of the original proprietors of Bridgewater, who immigrated from England in 1634. His mother's ancestor came on the same ship passage. Hayward attended the village schools, and in 1801 entered Bridgewater Academy, where he learned English grammar and arithmetic for three months.

Starting in late 1801, Hayward worked in stores in West Bridgewater, and later Plymouth. In 1803, he went to Hanover, to learn shipbuilding. He became partner with David Kingman in 1807, and married his daughter, Eliza Kingman, February 19, 1809. He traveled to England on one of his ships, the Belfast, in 1812, and returned to the U.S. in June of that year after hearing of the death of his partner and father-in-law Kingman. In Hanover, he decided to pursue the study of law at the office of John Winslow, esq. His studies were delayed by the need to attend to his father-in-law's estate, including a return to London for a lawsuit. He returned to East Bridgewater to study under Nahum Mitchell.

== Immigration to the West ==
In the autumn of 1819, having studied law off and on for four and one half years, Hayward emigrated to Cincinnati, Ohio, where he opened an office. He established a partnership with David Wade, which lasted for eight years. In 1825, he was elected to represent Hamilton County in the Ohio House of Representatives, serving until 1829 in the 24th to 27th General Assemblies.

In 1830, the two houses of the Ohio Legislature, in joint session, elected Hayward as a judge of the Ohio Supreme Court for a seven-year term. He only served a part of that year when he accepted an appointment from President Jackson as Commissioner of the United States General Land Office in Washington D.C. Hayward resigned in 1835, after his wife died, and returned to Ohio and the practice of law. In April, 1851, Hayward was named State librarian by Ohio Governor Reuben Wood. He served until May 1854.

Judge Hayward was a dedicated genealogist, who would spend weeks at a time copying the records of Plymouth Colony and towns of Massachusetts. He was elected a corresponding member of the Massachusetts Historical Society in 1854. He was a member of the Royal Society of Northern Antiquaries of Copenhagen. He was elected a corresponding member of the New England Historic Genealogical Society in 1852, and elected honorary vice-president for Ohio in 1855. His principal employment in later years was in preparing briefs before the Ohio Supreme Court. He adhered to the Puritanism of his ancestors, before rejecting it to accept the Roman Catholic faith. He died in McConnelsville, Morgan County, Ohio in 1864. Hayward left one son, George Hayward, born Hanover, Massachusetts, July 14, 1817.

== Notes ==
Ohio House of Representatives
Preceded by Samuel McHenry; William Carey	Representative from Hamilton County; 1825–1829; Served alongside: Samuel McHenry; Charles G. Swain; William Corry; John C. Short; Peter Bell; Alexander Duncan; Robert Todd Lytle	Succeeded by Samuel Reese; Alexander Duncan; David T. Disney; George Graham
Legal offices
Preceded by Calvin Pease	Ohio Supreme Court Judges; 1830	Succeeded by Ebenezer Lane
Political offices
Preceded by George Graham	Commissioner of the General Land Office; 1830–1835	Succeeded by Ethan Allen Brown
Preceded by John B. Greiner	State librarian of Ohio; 1851–1854	Succeeded by James Wickes Taylor
