= Frederick S. Spiegel =

German-American politician and lawyer (1858–1925)

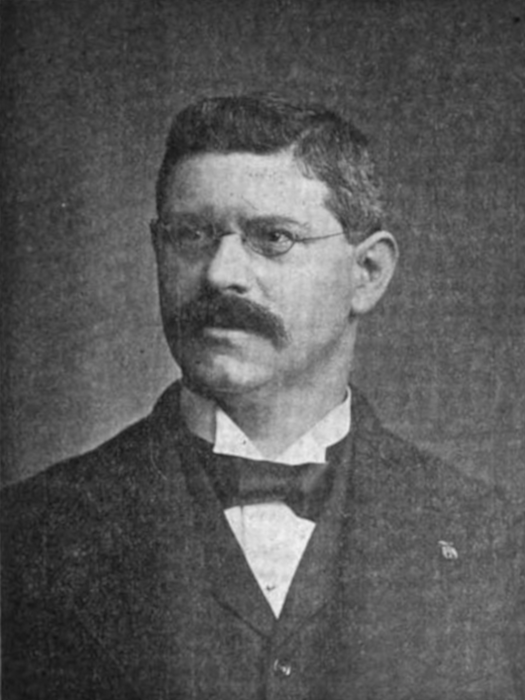

Mayor of Cincinnati
- In office January 1, 1914 – January 1, 1916
- Preceded by: Henry T. Hunt
- Succeeded by: George Puchta

Personal details
- Born: Frederick Siegfried Spiegel; November 20, 1858 Hovestadt, Westphalia, Prussia
- Died: January 23, 1925 (aged 66) Chicago, Illinois, U.S.
- Resting place: Clifton United Jewish Cemetery, Cincinnati, Ohio, U.S.
- Party: Republican
- Spouse: Minnie Steinberg (m. 1883)
- Occupation: Lawyer, judge, politician

Frederick Siegfried Spiegel (November 20, 1858 – January 23, 1925) was a German-born American lawyer, jurist, and politician who served as mayor of Cincinnati, Ohio, from 1914 to 1916.

== Early life and career ==
Spiegel was born into a Jewish family on November 20, 1858, in Hovestadt, Westphalia, Prussia. He attended the gymnasium in Paderborn until the age of fourteen, when his family emigrated to the United States. They moved to Gadsden, Alabama, where other members of the family had settled prior to the American Civil War. While attending that city's Southern Institute, Spiegel spent summers working for the Gadsden Times, where he wrote local news items and editorials and learned the printing trade.

After moving to Cincinnati, he worked as a proofreader for the Franklin Type Foundry and joined the Typographical Union, later serving two terms as its corresponding secretary and eventually becoming an honorary member. He subsequently joined the editorial staff of the German-language newspaper Cincinnati Volksblatt. On the advice of editor Friedrich Hassaurek, he began the study of law under Cincinnati City Solicitor Clement Bates before graduating with honors from Cincinnati College Law School in 1880 and being called to the bar of the Supreme Court of Ohio.

== Legal career ==
In 1881, Spiegel was appointed chief of the Ohio State Bureau of Statistics by Secretary of State Charles Townsend. During his tenure he reorganized the state's methods of compiling statistics and published a yearbook on Ohio history. After returning to Cincinnati, he entered private legal practice with Judge A. H. Bode. He also served on the Cincinnati Board of Education in 1880–83, where he chaired the German department and introduced reforms in the teaching of the German language.

Spiegel was elected Hamilton County solicitor in 1890 and was re-elected in 1893. In 1896 he was elected judge of the Hamilton County Court of Common Pleas and was subsequently re-elected in 1901 and 1907. After completing his service on the Court of Common Pleas, he returned briefly to private practice before being elected judge of the Superior Court of Cincinnati in 1908.

In addition to his judicial work, Spiegel contributed articles on legal and other subjects to various journals and was known for translating legal and historical works from foreign languages.

== Mayor of Cincinnati ==
In the 1913 municipal election, Spiegel, the Republican candidate, defeated incumbent mayor Henry T. Hunt by over 3,000 votes. He took office the following year and served a single term through 1916.

== Later life and death ==
After leaving the mayoralty, Spiegel became legal counsel to the Cincinnati Rapid Transit Commission. In that position he oversaw litigation connected with land acquisition for the city's subway system. Around 1924, while inspecting subway construction work, Spiegel fell from a platform. He suffered severe shock and internal injuries that confined him to his home for several months. His health continued to decline as a result of the accident, and he resigned from the commission in July 1924 because of his worsening condition.

He died on January 23, 1925, while visiting his daughter in Chicago, Illinois. Following news of his death, flags at Cincinnati City Hall were lowered to half-staff in his honor. Funeral services were held at the chapel of the Jewish cemetery in Clifton, Cincinnati. The subway project with which he had been associated was ultimately abandoned in 1928.

== Personal life ==
In December 1883, Spiegel married Minnie Steinberg in a ceremony performed by Rabbi Isaac M. Wise. They had three children, including Arthur Spiegel, who later served as a municipal court judge in Cincinnati. His grandson, S. Arthur Spiegel, became a United States district judge.

Siegel was a member of the Plum Street Temple. He was active in the Independent Order B'nai B'rith, serving as president of District No. 2, chairman of its district court, and later as a member of its supreme court. He was also a 32nd degree Freemason, a Shriner, and an Elk.
