= Brighton Place station =

Abandoned subway station in Ohio, USA

Brighton Place
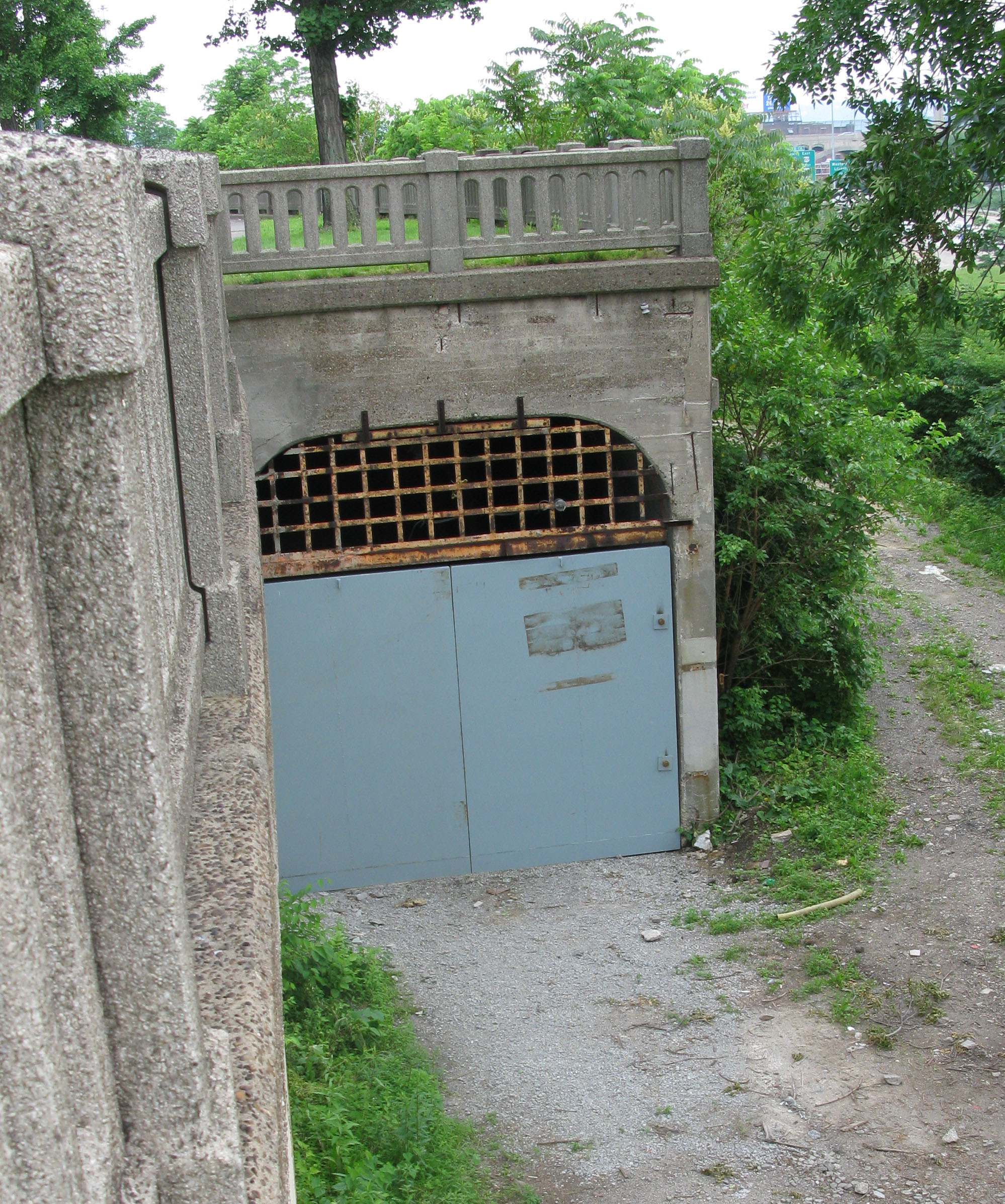
- This tunnel entrance near the Western Hills Viaduct is clearly visible from Interstate 75.

General information
- Location: Brighton Place & Central Parkway, Cincinnati, Ohio; United States
- Coordinates: 39°07′19″N 84°31′55″W
- Owner: City of Cincinnati
- Platforms: 2 side platforms
- Tracks: 2

History
- Opened: never opened

Services
Preceding station	Cincinnati Subway	Following station
Marshall Avenue toward Clifton Avenue	Main Line	Linn Street toward Race Street
Location

Brighton Place is a station of the abandoned Cincinnati Subway in the US. The station is the last through station before the tracks go above ground along the Interstate 75 highway. The station was planned in 1916, but was not completed due to lack of funding. Beyond this station three more above-ground stations were constructed, Marshall Avenue, Ludlow Avenue, and Clifton Avenue, but demolished when Interstate 75 was built. In 2002, the station was proposed to be part of the MetroMoves light rail system, but the plans were rejected.
