= Charles W. Sawyer =

American politician

Charles Sawyer
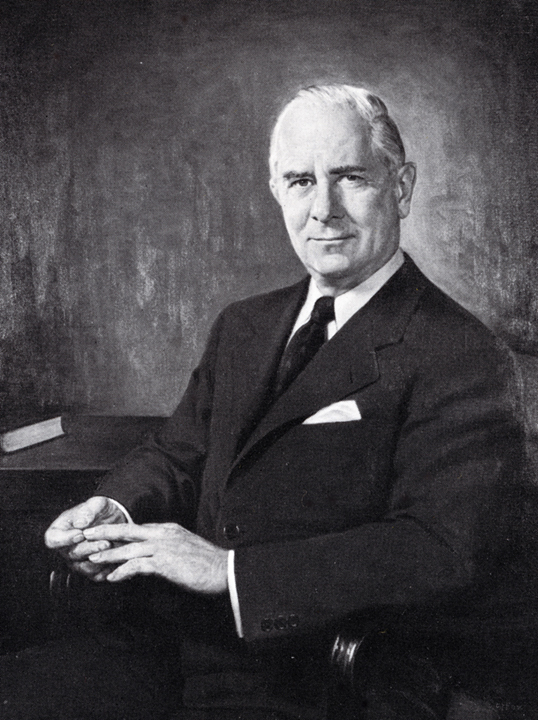

12th United States Secretary of Commerce
- In office May 6, 1948 – January 20, 1953
- President: Harry S. Truman
- Preceded by: W. Averell Harriman
- Succeeded by: Sinclair Weeks

United States Ambassador to Belgium
- In office November 8, 1944 – November 20, 1945
- President: Franklin D. Roosevelt Harry S. Truman
- Preceded by: Ernest de Wael Mayer (acting)
- Succeeded by: Alan G. Kirk

United States Ambassador to Luxembourg
- In office November 1, 1944 – November 20, 1945
- President: Franklin D. Roosevelt
- Preceded by: Winthrop Greene (acting)
- Succeeded by: Alan G. Kirk

44th Lieutenant Governor of Ohio
- In office January 9, 1933 – January 14, 1935
- Governor: George White
- Preceded by: William G. Pickrel
- Succeeded by: Harold G. Mosier

Personal details
- Born: February 10, 1887 Cincinnati, Ohio, U.S.
- Died: April 7, 1979 (aged 92) Palm Beach, Florida, U.S.
- Resting place: Spring Grove Cemetery
- Party: Democratic
- Spouses: Margaret Sterrett Johnston (m. 1918; died 1937); Elizabeth Lippelman de Veyrac (m. 1942)
- Children: 5
- Education: Oberlin College (BA); University of Cincinnati (LLB)

Military service
- Branch: United States Army
- Years of service: 1917–1919
- Rank: Major
- Unit: 89th Division
- Battles/wars: World War I

Charles W. Sawyer (February 10, 1887 – April 7, 1979) was an American lawyer and diplomat who served as the U.S. secretary of commerce from May 6, 1948, to January 20, 1953, in the administration of Harry Truman.

== Early life ==
Sawyer was born in Cincinnati on February 10, 1887. He was a son of Caroline (née Butler) Sawyer and Edward Milton Sawyer, a Maine Republican who moved to Ohio become a principal.

He attended Oberlin College, earning a Bachelor of Arts degree in 1908, followed by the University of Cincinnati, where he received his law degree in 1911.

== Career ==
=== Early career ===
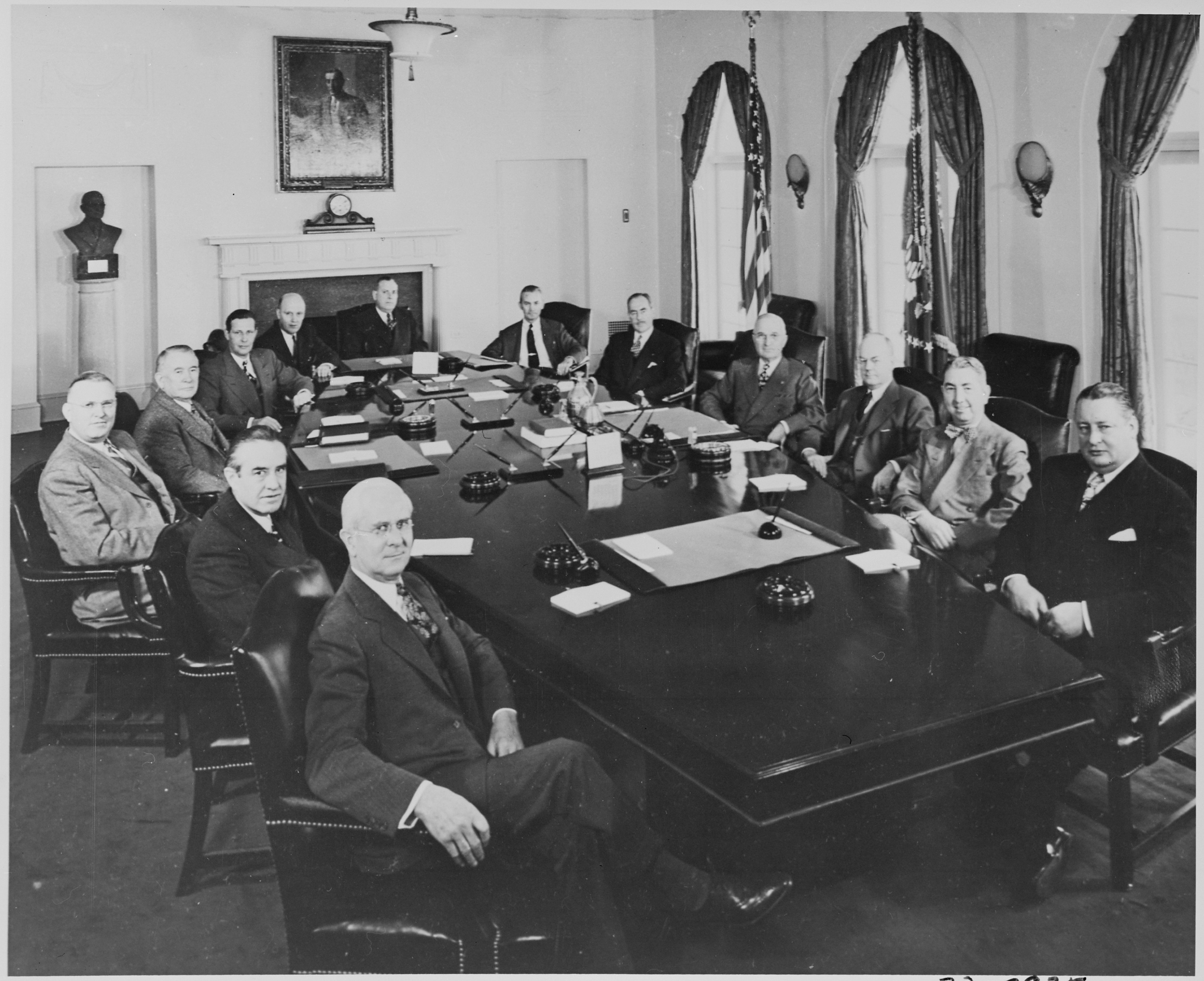
Sawyer (in the foreground) as Secretary of Commerce at a meeting of Truman's cabinet (February 1949)

He served as a member of Cincinnati City Council from 1912 until 1916 when he ran for Mayor of Cincinnati losing to George Puchta. Prior to his political career, he worked at the Cincinnati law firm of Dinsmore & Shohl.

=== Military service ===
In August 1917, Sawyer joined the military for World War I, and was commissioned from civilian life as a captain of Infantry. After completing initial training at Fort Benjamin Harrison, Indiana, he served with the 158th Depot Brigade Camp Sherman, Ohio and was assigned as the post's provost marshal. In August 1918, he was promoted to Major. He then served in France as adjutant of the 178th Infantry Brigade, a unit of the 89th Division. After the Armistice of November 11, 1918 ended the war, Sawyer continued to serve in Europe as part of the Occupation of the Rhineland. He returned to the United States in May 1919, and was discharged on 31 May. Following his wartime service, Sawyer frequently participated in veterans events, and was a longtime member of the American Legion and Veterans of Foreign Wars.

=== Post-war career ===
Sawyer was also involved in several business ventures, including the American Rolling Mill Company and a share of the Cincinnati Reds, the Cincinnati Gardens, and a chain of newspapers and radio stations (through Great Trails Broadcasting Corporation).

Between the Wars, he was a prominent Ohio Democratic politician. In the 1930s, a faction led by Sawyer vied with a faction led by Martin L. Davey for control of the state Democratic party. He was the 44th lieutenant governor of Ohio from 1933 to 1935. Sawyer authored the Twenty-first Amendment which repealed the Eighteenth Amendment to the U.S. Constitution which established the prohibition of alcohol in the United States. From 1936 to 1944, Sawyer served as a member of the Democratic National Committee. In 1938, he was an unsuccessful candidate for governor of Ohio.

=== Federal service ===
==== Ambassadorship ====
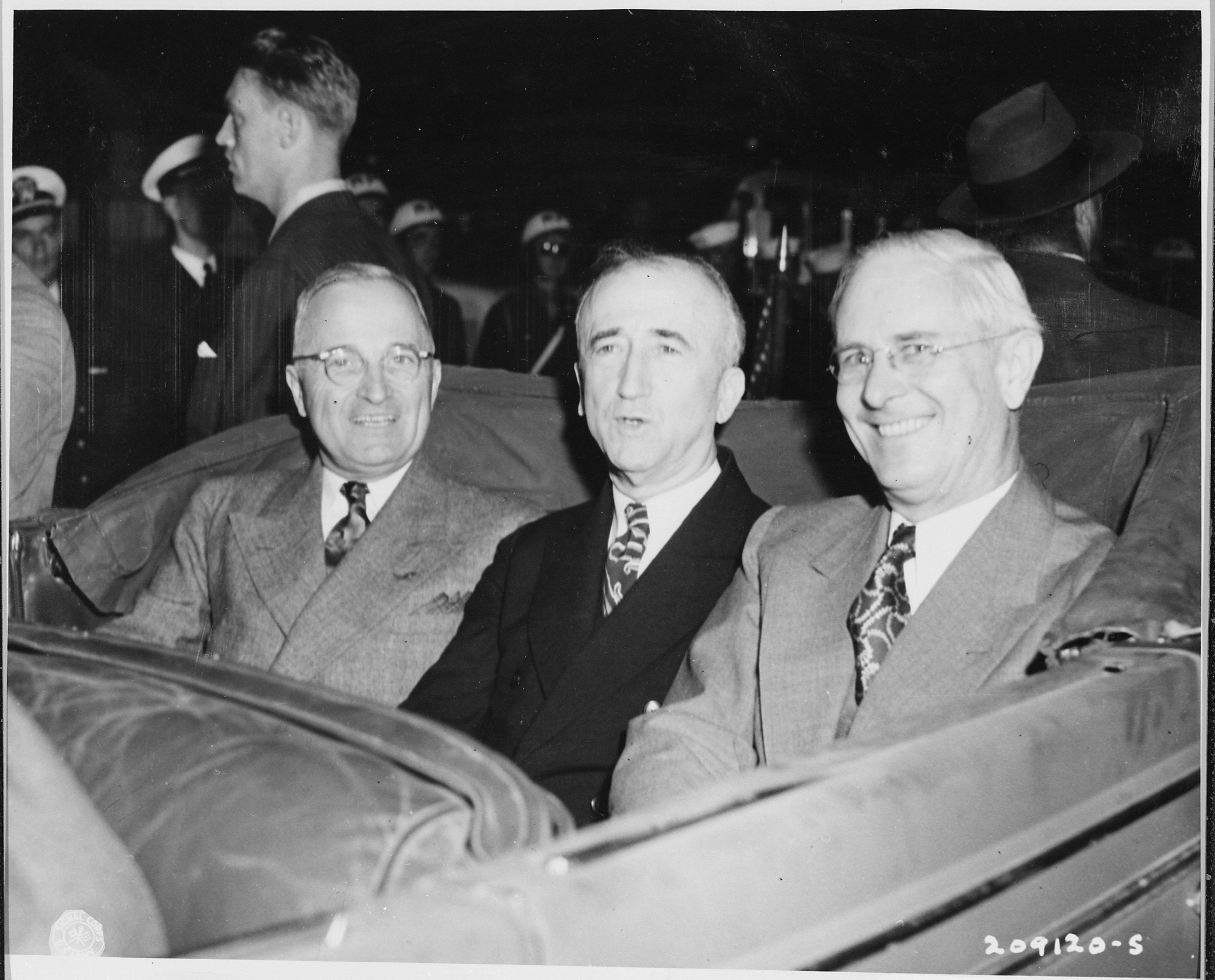
Secretary of State James F. Byrnes (center), President Truman (left) and Ambassador Sawyer, on the president's arrival in Antwerp en route to Germany to attend the Potsdam Conference.

In 1944, President Franklin D. Roosevelt appointed Sawyer as the United States Ambassador to Belgium and served as was Minister to Luxembourg during the difficult period from 1944 to 1946, at the beginning of the Belgian Royal Question concerning King Leopold III of Belgium. Two years later, President Harry Truman appointed Sawyer to the U.S. Civil Service Commission's Review Board. Sawyer had first met Truman upon the latter's arrival in Antwerp en route to Germany to attend the Potsdam Conference.

==== Secretary of Commerce ====
In 1948, Sawyer was chosen to succeed W. Averell Harriman as the United States Secretary of Commerce. While Secretary of Commerce, Sawyer was ordered by Truman to seize and operate the steel mills in 1952. This seizure was executed to prevent a labor strike which Truman believed would hamper the ability of the United States to proceed in the war in Korea.

While Secretary of Commerce, Secretary Sawyer declared the first National Secretaries Week from June 1 to 7, 1952. He designated Wednesday, June 4, as National Secretaries Day for this formerly male-dominated field of work turned female-dominated by sociocultural anamorphisms. Upon the end of Truman's term as office, Sawyer's term as Commerce Secretary also ended and he was succeeded by the Republican Sinclair Weeks who served during the administration of President Dwight D. Eisenhower.

=== Later career ===
When Sawyer returned to Cincinnati after serving President Truman, he joined the law firm of Taft, Stettinius, and Hollister, which had been founded by another prominent Cincinnati politician, Robert A. Taft (the elder son of President William Howard Taft), and became its managing partner. Following Taft's death, Sawyer succeeded to his seat on the board of the Central Trust Company, a Cincinnati bank.

In 1968, he authored Concerns of a Conservative Democrat which was published by the Southern Illinois University Press. Sawyer served on the Hoover Commission on Overseas Economic Operations Task Force, the Commission on Money and Credit, and the World's Fair Site Committee.

Sawyer gave $1 million to purchase 123 acres of riverfront property in Cincinnati for what became Sawyer Point Park.

== Personal life ==
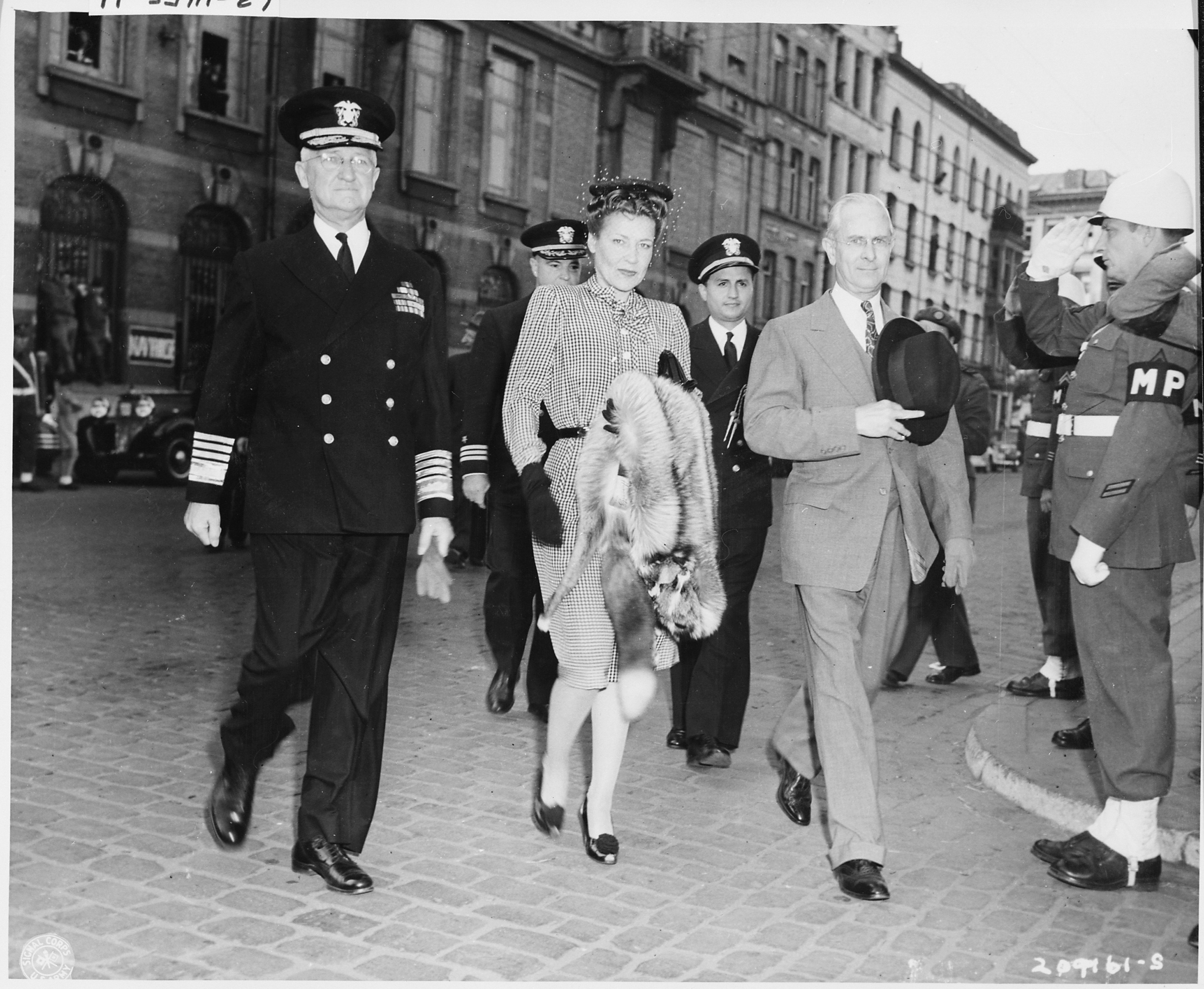
Ambassador Sawyer, Mrs. Sawyer, and Harold Stark walking to the meeting with President Harry S. Truman in July 1945.

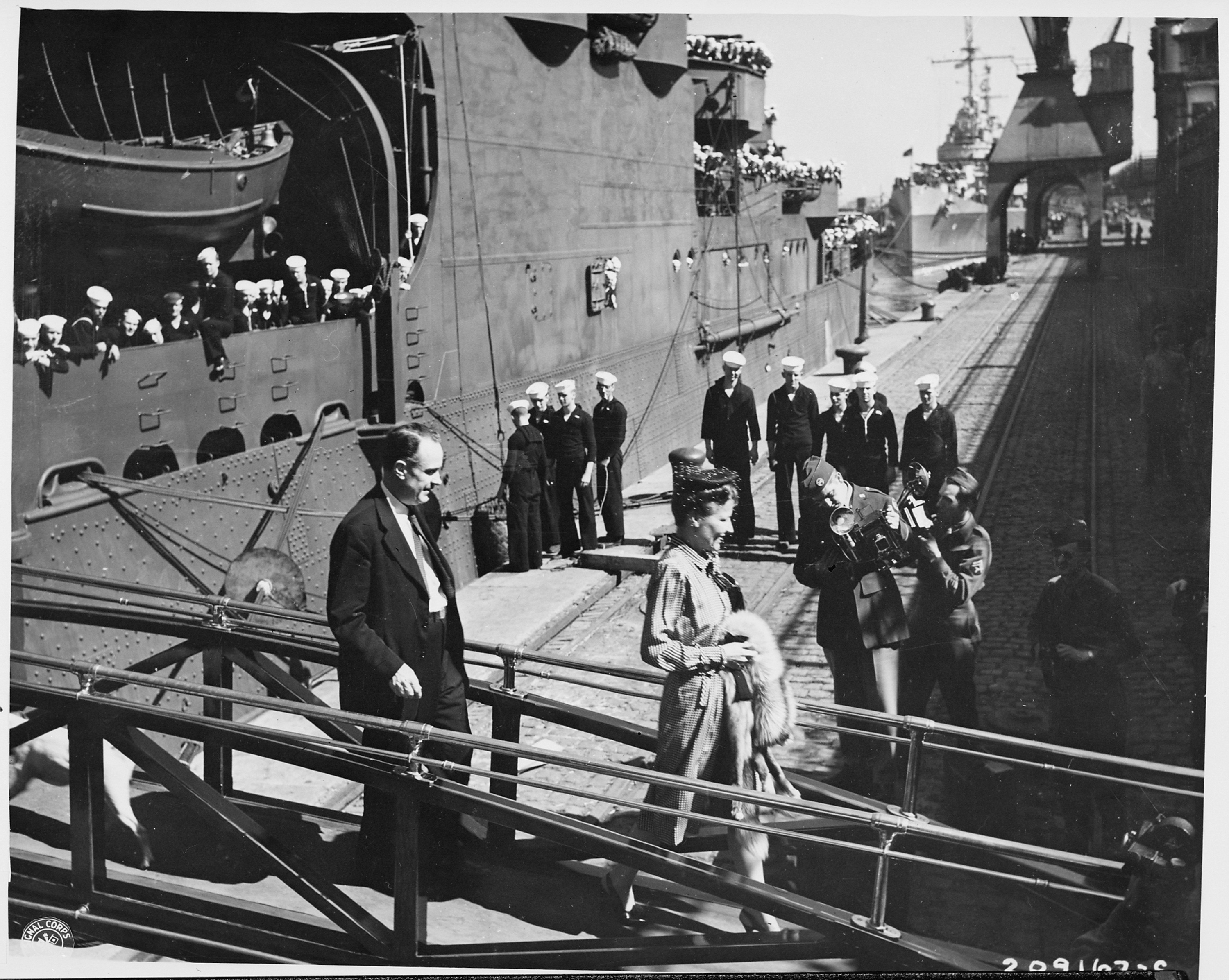
Mrs. Elizabeth Sawyer leaving the Augusta after paying respects to President Truman in 1945.

On July 15, 1918, Sawyer married his first wife, Margaret Sterrett Johnston, a niece of Col. William Cooper Procter of Procter & Gamble. Together, they had five children, two daughters and three sons, including: Anne Johnston Sawyer (who married John Pattison Williams. She later married John Bradley Greene); Charles W. Sawyer II; Jean Johnston Sawyer (who married the Very Rev. John J. Weaver, Dean of Detroit Cathedral, in 1948); John William Sawyer; and Edward Milton Sawyer.

After Margaret's death in 1937, Sawyer married his second wife, Countess Elizabeth (née Lippelman) de Veyrac (1907–1999), on June 10, 1942. Elizabeth, who was living in Glendale, Ohio, was previously married to Louis Renner of Cincinnati and then Count Robert de Veyrac. They had no children.

He died in April 1979, at age 92, at his home in Palm Beach, Florida. He was buried at Spring Grove Cemetery near his birthplace in Cincinnati, Ohio.

Political offices
Preceded by William G. Pickrel	Lieutenant Governor of Ohio; 1933–1935	Succeeded by Harold G. Mosier
Preceded by W. Averell Harriman	United States Secretary of Commerce; 1948–1953	Succeeded by Sinclair Weeks
Party political offices
Preceded by Martin L. Davey	Democratic nominee for Governor of Ohio; 1938	Succeeded by Martin L. Davey
Diplomatic posts
Preceded by Winthrop Greene; Acting	United States Ambassador to Luxembourg; 1944–1945	Succeeded by Alan G. Kirk
Preceded by Ernest de Wael Mayer; Acting	United States Ambassador to Belgium; 1944–1945	Succeeded by Alan G. Kirk
