= Marshall Avenue station =

Abandoned subway station in Ohio, USA

Marshall Avenue

General information
- Location: Marshall Avenue, Cincinnati, Ohio; United States
- Coordinates: 39°07′56″N 84°31′56″W
- Owner: City of Cincinnati
- Platforms: 2 side platforms
- Tracks: 2

History
- Opened: Never opened

Services
Preceding station	Cincinnati Subway	Following station
Ludlow Avenue toward Clifton Avenue	Main Line	Brighton Place toward Race Street
Location

Marshall Avenue is a demolished subway station of the Cincinnati Subway. The station was constructed as part of the subway plan passed by voters in 1916, but was demolished in 1961 to make space for Interstate 75. Two more above ground stations were constructed and similarly demolished, Ludlow Avenue, and Clifton Avenue.
