= Linn Street station =

Linn Street

General information
- Location: Linn Street & Central Parkway, Cincinnati, Ohio; United States
- Coordinates: 39°07′12″N 84°31′30″W
- Owner: City of Cincinnati
- Platforms: 2 side platforms
- Tracks: 2

History
- Opened: Never opened

Services
Preceding station	Cincinnati Subway	Following station
Brighton Place toward Clifton Avenue	Main Line	Liberty Street toward Race Street
Location

Linn Street is an abandoned and never used subway station of the Cincinnati Subway. The station was planned in 1916, but lacked funding to complete.
