= Markbreit =

Markbreit is a German surname. Notable people with the surname include:

- Jerry Markbreit (born 1935), American football official
- Leopold Markbreit (1842–1909), American diplomat
