= S. S. Davis =

American politician

Simon Stevens Davis

19th Mayor of Cincinnati
- In office 1871–1873
- Preceded by: John F. Torrence
- Succeeded by: George W. C. Johnston

Personal details
- Born: December 19, 1817 Rockingham, Vermont
- Died: May 11, 1896 (aged 78) Newton, Massachusetts
- Party: Democratic

Simon Stevens Davis (Dec. 19, 1817 – May 11, 1896) was an American politician from the U.S. state of Ohio. He served as the 19th Mayor of Cincinnati, Ohio.

== Biography ==
He moved from New England to Ohio in 1843 and established a banking and brokerage firm before entering politics. In 1858 Davis was elected as a Republican to the Cincinnati City Council and went on to serve as Mayor from 1871 to 1873. He was the speaker at the dedication ceremony of the Tyler Davidson Fountain, and was instrumental in organizing the Relief Union during the Civil War to help needy families of soldiers and working with the Home of the Friendless and Foundlings.

Davis served on the board of directors and was a founding member of the original Cincinnati Baseball Club which was formed in 1866. Also known as the Cincinnati Red-Stockings, they became the first professional baseball team in 1868. Simon Davis was one of the eight board members who made that decision to 'go pro' on September 9, 1868.

He is buried at Spring Grove Cemetery in Cincinnati.

Political offices
Preceded by John F. Torrence	Mayor of Cincinnati, Ohio; 1871–1873	Succeeded by George W. C. Johnston
