= List of mayors of Cincinnati =

Mayor of Cincinnati
- Seal of Cincinnati, Ohio

- Flag of Cincinnati, Ohio

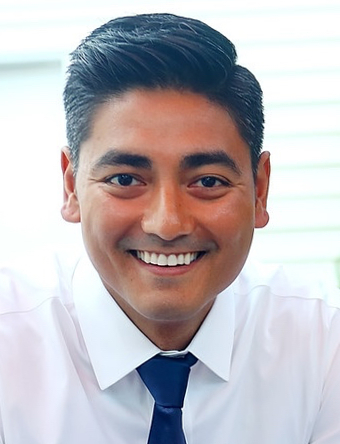
- Incumbent; Aftab Pureval since January 4, 2022
- Style: The Honorable
- Term length: Four years; may serve two consecutive terms; renewable once
- Inaugural holder: David Ziegler
- Formation: 1802
- Succession: Vice Mayor of Cincinnati
- Salary: $121,291
- Website: Office of the Mayor

The mayor of Cincinnati is recognized as the official head and representative of the city for all purposes. There have been seventy mayors of Cincinnati. The first mayor was David Ziegler, who took office in 1802. The current mayor is Aftab Pureval, who was elected on November 2, 2021, and took office at noon on January 4, 2022.

== Executive powers ==
The mayor shall preside over all meetings of the Cincinnati City Council. The mayor may call a special meeting of the council, but may not have a vote in the council. The mayor has the power to propose legislation for debate among the council. The mayor shall appoint and may remove the vice-mayor and the chair of all committees of the council without the advice and consent of the council.

The mayor of Cincinnati shall be recognized as the official head and representative of the city for all purposes, except as provided otherwise in the city charter of Cincinnati. The mayor may appoint a city manager upon an affirmative vote of five members of the city council following the mayor's recommendation.

The mayor delivers an annual address to the council and citizens of the city reporting on the state of the city and making recommendations for the establishment and achievement of future city goals.

In time of public danger or emergency, the mayor, with the consent of the council, may take command of the police, maintain order and enforce the law.

== Succession ==
In the event of the death, removal or resignation of the mayor, the vice mayor of Cincinnati shall succeed to the office of mayor in accordance with the city charter. The current vice mayor is Jan Michelle Kearney.

== History ==
Until the charter of 1815, the president of the council served as equivalent of mayor. Two sources agree on the list of presidents:

Prior to 1925 (and since 1999) the mayor of Cincinnati, Ohio was elected in a separate, partisan election.

In 1924, the Charter Party, a local third-party, was founded. It has elected members of the city council and mayors. Until 1961, many Democrats ran as Charterites. The party focuses exclusively on local government; thus, many Charterites switch to a major party when seeking office outside Cincinnati.

From 1925 through 1998, the mayor was chosen by the city council from among its nine members.

In 1971, a coalition of two parties, the Democrats and the Charterites, worked out a power-sharing plan, which, starting in 1973, resulted in a rotating mayorship. After a few years of rotation, they decided that the city council member who received the most votes in the election would automatically become mayor.

In 1999, Charlie Luken became the first mayor to take office under a restored system of direct mayoral election.

== Mayor firsts ==
In 1900, Julius Fleischmann became the youngest mayor of Cincinnati at the age of 28 years.

In 1954, Dorothy N. Dolbey became the first female mayor of the City of Cincinnati.

In 1972, Ted Berry, became the first African-American Mayor of Cincinnati.

In 2006, Mark Mallory was the first directly elected African-American Mayor of Cincinnati.

On November 2, 2021, Aftab Pureval was elected the first Asian American mayor of Cincinnati. Mayor Pureval is the 70th and current mayor of Cincinnati.

== List of mayors ==
Dates	Image	Name	Life dates	Party	Elected by
1802–1803		David Ziegler	1748–1811	no party	public
1803–1804		Joseph Prince		no party	public
1805–1806		James Findlay	1770–1835	no party	public
1807		John S. Gano			public
1807		Martin Baum	1765–1831		public
1808–1809		Daniel Symmes	1772–1817		public
1810–1811		James Findlay (2nd)	1770–1835		public
1812		Martin Baum (2nd)	1765–1831		public
1813		William Stanley			public
1814		Samuel W. Davies	1776–1843		public
1815–1819		William Corry	1779–1833		public
1819–1831		Isaac G. Burnet	1784–1856		public
1831–1833		Elisha Hotchkiss	1778–1858	Democratic	public
1833–1843		Samuel W. Davies	1776–1843	Whig	public
1843–1851		Henry E. Spencer	1807–1882	Whig	public
1851–1853		Mark P. Taylor		Democratic	public
1853–1855		David T. Snelbaker	1804–1867	Democratic	public
1855–1857		James J. Faran	1808–1892	Democratic	public
1857–1859		Nicholas W. Thomas	1810–1864	Whig	public
1859–1861		Richard M. Bishop	1812–1893	Democratic	public
1861–1863		George Hatch		Democratic	public
1863–1866		Leonard A. Harris	1824–1890	Republican	public
1866–1869		Charles F. Wilstach	1818–1882	Republican	public
1869–1871		John F. Torrence	1819–1883	Republican	public
1871–1873		S. S. Davis	1817–1896	Republican	public
1873–1877		George W. C. Johnston	1828–1879	Democratic	public
1877–1879		Robert M. Moore	1816–1880	Republican	public
1879–1881		Charles Jacob Jr.	1834–1913	Republican	public
1881–1883		William F. Means		Democratic	public
1883–1885		Thomas J. Stephens	1823–1892	Democratic	public
1885–1889		Amor Smith Jr.	1840–1915	Republican	public
1889–1894		John B. Mosby	1845–1928	Republican	public
1894–1897		John A. Caldwell	1852–1927	Republican	public
1897–1900		Gustav Tafel	1830–1908	Democratic	public
1900–1905		Julius Fleischmann	1871–1925	Republican	public
1906–1907		Edward J. Dempsey	1858–1929	Democratic	public
1908–1909		Leopold Markbreit	1842–1909	Republican	public
1909		John Galvin	1862–1922	Republican	public
1910–1911		Louis Schwab	1850–1926	Republican	public
1912–1913		Henry Thomas Hunt	1879–1956	Democratic	public
1914–1915		Frederick S. Spiegel	1855–1925	Republican	public
1916–1917		George Puchta	1860–1937	Republican	public
1918–1921		John Galvin (2nd)	1862–1922	Republican	public
1922–1925		George Carrel	1865–1949	Republican	public
1926–1929		Murray Seasongood	1878–1983	Charterite	council
1930–1937		Russell Wilson	1876–1946	Charterite	council
1938–1947		James G. Stewart	1880–1959	Republican	council
1947–1948		Carl W. Rich	1898–1972	Republican	council
1948–1951		Albert D. Cash	1897–1952	Democratic	council
1951–1953		Carl W. Rich (2nd)	1898–1972	Republican	council
1953–1954		Edward N. Waldvogel	1894–1954	Charterite	council
1954		Dorothy N. Dolbey	1908–1991	Charterite	council
1954		Carl W. Rich (3rd)	1898–1972	Republican	council
1955–1957		Charles Phelps Taft II	1897–1983	Republican	council
1957–1960		Donald D. Clancy	1921–2007	Republican	council
1960–1967		Walton H. Bachrach	1904–1989	Republican	council
1967–1971		Eugene P. Ruehlmann	1925–2013	Republican	council
1971		Willis D. Gradison Jr.	1928–	Republican	council
1971–1972		Thomas A. Luken	1925–2018	Democratic	council
1972–1975		Theodore M. Berry	1905–2000	Charterite	council
1975–1976		Bobbie L. Sterne	1919–2017	Charterite	council
1976–1977		James T. Luken	1921–1979	Democratic	council
1977–1978		Jerry Springer	1944–2023	Democratic	council
1978–1979		Bobbie L. Sterne (2nd)	1919–2017	Charterite	council
1979–1980		J. Kenneth Blackwell	1948–	Charterite	council
1980–1982		David S. Mann	1939–	Democratic	council
1982–1983		Thomas B. Brush	1934–	Charterite	council
1983–1984		Arnold L. Bortz	1946–2025	Charterite	council
1984–1991		Charles J. Luken	1951–	Democratic	council
1991		David S. Mann (2nd)	1939–	Democratic	council
1991–1993		Dwight Tillery	1948–	Democratic	council
1993–1999		Roxanne Qualls	1953–	Democratic	council
1999–2005		Charles J. Luken (2nd)	1951–	Democratic	public
2006–2013		Mark Mallory	1962–	Democratic	public
2013–2022		John Cranley	1974–	Democratic	public
2022–present		Aftab Pureval	1982–	Democratic	public

== See also ==
- Cincinnati mayoral elections
- Cincinnati City Council
- Timeline of Cincinnati
