= 1938 Ohio gubernatorial election =

- November 8, 1938
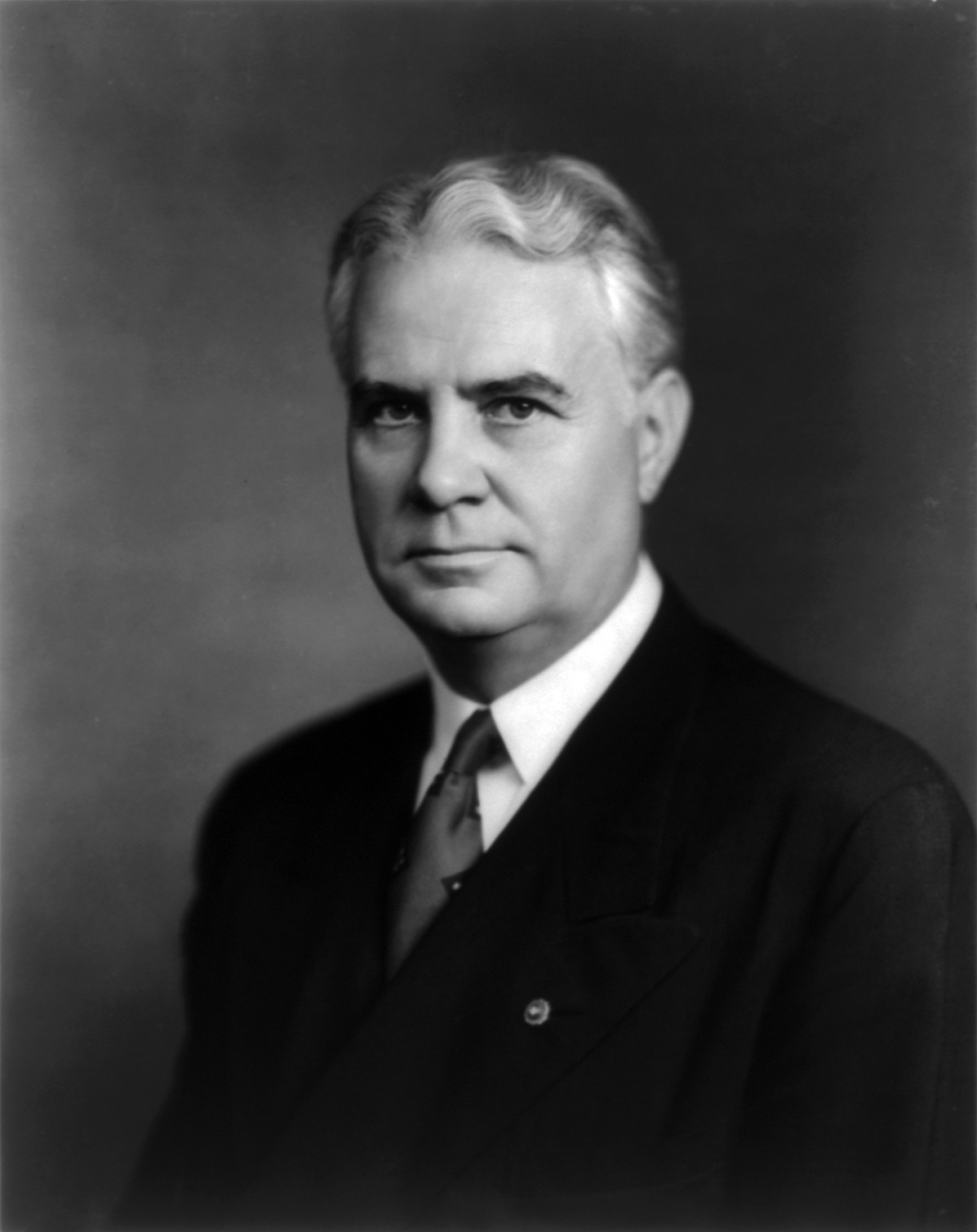

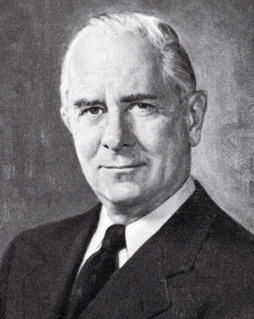
Nominee	John W. Bricker	Charles W. Sawyer
Party	Republican	Democratic
Popular vote	1,265,548	1,147,323
Percentage	52.45%	47.55%
- County results Bricker: 50–60% 60–70% 70–80% Sawyer: 50–60% 60–70%
Governor before election
Martin L. Davey
Democratic
Elected Governor
John W. Bricker
Republican

The 1938 Ohio gubernatorial election was held on November 8, 1938. Republican nominee John W. Bricker defeated Democratic nominee Charles W. Sawyer with 52.45% of the vote.

== General election ==
=== Candidates ===
- John W. Bricker, Republican
- Charles W. Sawyer, Democratic

=== Results ===
1938 Ohio gubernatorial election
Party	Candidate	Votes	%	±%
Republican	John W. Bricker	1,265,548	52.45%	
Democratic	Charles W. Sawyer	1,147,323	47.55%	
Majority		118,225		
Turnout				
Republican gain from Democratic		Swing		
