= Robert M. Moore =

American politician

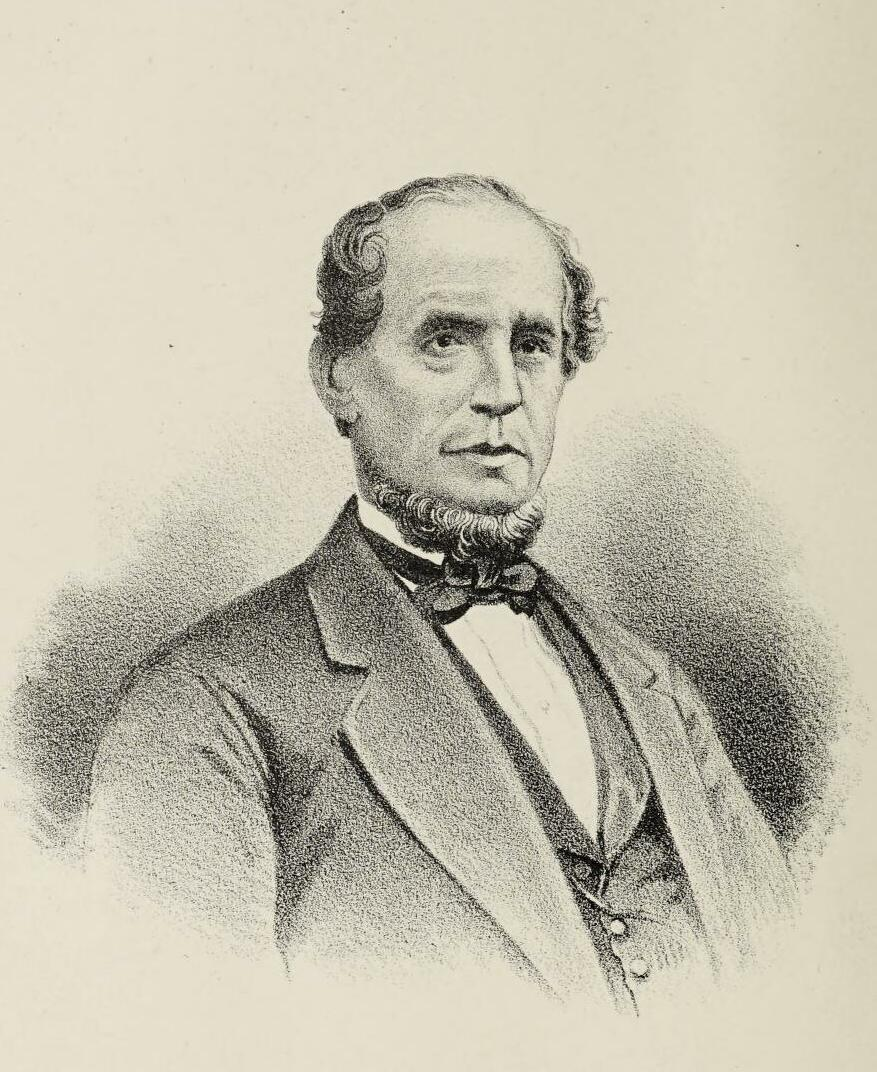
Colonel Robert M. Moore

Robert M. Moore (c. 1816–1880) was an Irish-American mayor of Cincinnati.

Born in Cookstown, Ireland, Robert M. Moore immigrated about 1832 via Canada to the United States. Moore was a veteran of the Mexican–American War and as an officer joined the predominantly Irish American 10th Ohio Infantry in the Civil War. A Republican, Moore served as mayor of Cincinnati from 1877 to 1880.

Preceded by George W. C. Johnston	Mayor of Cincinnati, Ohio; 1877-1879	Succeeded by Charles Jacob Jr.
