= David Ziegler =

German-American; first mayor of Cincinnati (1748–1811)

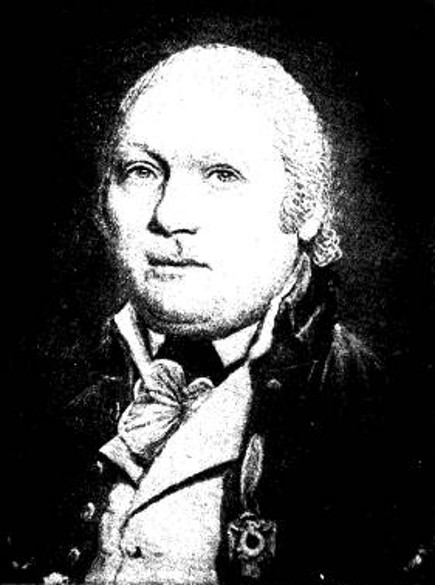

1st Mayor of Cincinnati, Ohio
- In office 1802–1803
- Preceded by: office created
- Succeeded by: James Findlay

Personal details
- Born: July 13, 1748 Heidelberg, Holy Roman Empire
- Died: September 24, 1811 (aged 63) Cincinnati, Ohio

David Ziegler (July 13, 1748 – September 24, 1811) was a German immigrant to the United States who served in the U.S. military and became the first mayor of Cincinnati, Ohio.

== Early life and career ==
Johann David Ziegler was born in Heidelberg, Germany. Little is known of his early life. He became a soldier, and was said to have been a subordinate officer under Frederick the Great. He served with distinction in the army of Russia during the Russo-Turkish War (1768–1774). He became an officer, was wounded in action, and resigned his commission in 1774 with the demobilization of the Russian army.

About 1775 Ziegler emigrated to Lancaster County, Pennsylvania, soon before shooting began in the American Revolutionary War. He served in the Continental Army as a lieutenant and adjutant under Colonel William Thompson in the 1st Pennsylvania Regiment, a unit with many German immigrants. He was severely wounded at the Battle of Long Island on August 27, 1776. After recovering, he rejoined General George Washington's army for the Philadelphia campaign, seeing action at Brandywine, Germantown, Paoli and Monmouth, and wintering with the army at Valley Forge.

He was promoted to captain in December 1778, and served as brigade inspector of the Pennsylvania Brigade, his experience making him a good choice for drill instructor. He subsequently served as commissary general under General Arthur St. Clair, though he preferred to serve in the field with his regiment. His unit, being well-disciplined, did not participate in the mutiny of the Pennsylvania Line in January 1781. The Pennsylvania troops were reorganized and Ziegler was present at the surrender of Cornwallis at Yorktown in October 1781. After Yorktown Ziegler accompanied his regiment to South Carolina to serve under General Anthony Wayne. With the end of the war, Ziegler retired from the army on January 1, 1783. Unsure about what he was going to do with his life, he openly wept during the final review of the troops by General Nathanael Greene.

== Frontier soldier ==
After the war he settled in Carlisle, Pennsylvania, and opened a grocery store. He became a member of the Society of the Cincinnati. Military service again beckoned, and in August 1784 he was commissioned a captain in the United States Army to serve on the Ohio Valley frontier in the First American Regiment under Lieutenant Colonel Josiah Harmar. In 1789 he was promoted to major by President George Washington. That year he commanded the military escort to Native Americans, including Chief Cornplanter, at the Treaty of Fort Harmar near Marietta, Ohio. While stationed at Fort Harmar, Ziegler married Lucy Anne Sheffield on February 22, 1789. Sheffield was a native of Rhode Island, and had come to Marietta with her widowed mother, who was a shareholder in the Ohio Company. The Zieglers did not have any children.

In 1790 Ziegler was a part of Harmar's campaign against the Native American confederacy in Ohio, which ended in defeat and retreat to Fort Washington. Ziegler was a witness at Harmar's court of inquiry: he supported his commander and blamed the debacle on undisciplined militia, inadequate supplies, and poor logistics.

Commissioned a major in the First American Regiment on October 22, 1790, the next year Ziegler served as second-in-command under Major Jean François Hamtramck, and defending the baggage train for General Arthur St. Clair in another expedition into the Northwest Territory. St. Clair met with even more disastrous results than Harmar at St. Clair's Defeat. Ziegler performed well, covering the retreat of the fleeing Americans. Ziegler was placed in command of the western forces when St. Clair was recalled for a court of inquiry. Once again Ziegler was called to testify, and again he supported his commander. Disturbed by disputes and jealousy in the officer corps, he resigned from the army on March 5, 1792.

== Cincinnati ==
Ziegler settled near Cincinnati, trying his hand at farming before opening a general store in the town. In December 1799, after hearing the news of the death of President Washington, Ziegler was a pallbearer in a mock funeral held for Washington, one of many such ceremonies performed around the country.

After the rapidly growing settlement of Cincinnati was incorporated as a village in 1802, Ziegler was elected as mayor, then known as "President of the Council". He was unanimously reelected for a second term in 1803, but declined to run again in 1804. He was thereafter elected as commander of the local militia and held other public offices, including serving in 1807 as the adjutant general of the Ohio Militia.

He was a wealthy man when he died in 1811. He was buried in Cincinnati. As the city grew, in 1844 his remains were transferred to another cemetery in the city. Several years later his remains were moved once again to lie with his wife in Woodland Cemetery in Dayton, Ohio. Cincinnati's Ziegler Park, at Sycamore Street between 13th and 14th Streets, was named for him by Over-the-Rhine Germans.

Historian James H. O'Donnell wrote:

Ziegler was one of those absolutely dependable soldiers and public servants to whom the new country owed a great debt. Throughout his career, he had fulfilled responsibility in the most exemplary manner. Whether escorting ammunition to General Washington, carrying a flag of truce to enemy lines, guarding Native American diplomats, or standing fast in the face of enemy fire amid hysterical militia in retreat, Ziegler was ever the calm, loyal professional.

== Dates of rank ==
- 3rd Lieutenant and adjutant, Thompson's Pennsylvania Rifle Battalion - 25 June 1775
- 2nd Lieutenant, 1st Continental Infantry - 1 January 1776
- 1st Lieutenant, 1st Pennsylvania Regiment - 16 January 1777
- Captain, 1st Pennsylvania Regiment - 8 December 1778
- Retired - 1 January 1783
- Captain, United States Infantry Regiment - 12 August 1784
- Major, 1st Infantry Regiment - 22 October 1790
- Resigned - 5 March 1792

== Sources ==
- Katzenberger, George A. Major David Ziegler: Biography of the First Mayor of Cincinnati. Columbus, Ohio: Heer, 1912. Originally published in Ohio Archæological and Historical Quarterly. ISBN 0-8191-7696-6. Accessed via Google Book Search. Also available online from the Ohio Historical Society.
- O'Donnell, James H., III. "Ziegler, David". American National Biography Online, February 2000.

=== Primary sources ===
- Forrer-Peirce-Wood Collection (MS-018), including the Major David Zeigler Papers. Dayton Metro Library, Dayton, Ohio. "View online finding aid".

Preceded by –	Mayor of Cincinnati, Ohio; 1802–1803	Succeeded by Joseph Prince
Military offices
Preceded by Samuel Findlay	Adjutant General of Ohio; 1806–1807	Succeeded by Thomas Worthington
