= Henry E. Spencer =

American politician

Henry Evans Spencer (born June 13, 1807, in Columbia – now part of Cincinnati) was Mayor of Cincinnati from 1843 to 1851. He died February 2, 1882, at the age of 74.

Spencer was member of the City Council in Cincinnati for a number of years before becoming Mayor. He was a member of the Whig party, though some years later he became a Democrat. Spencer was succeeded as mayor by Mark P. Taylor in 1851.
