= Liberty Street station =

Abandoned railway station in Cincinnati, Ohio

Liberty Street
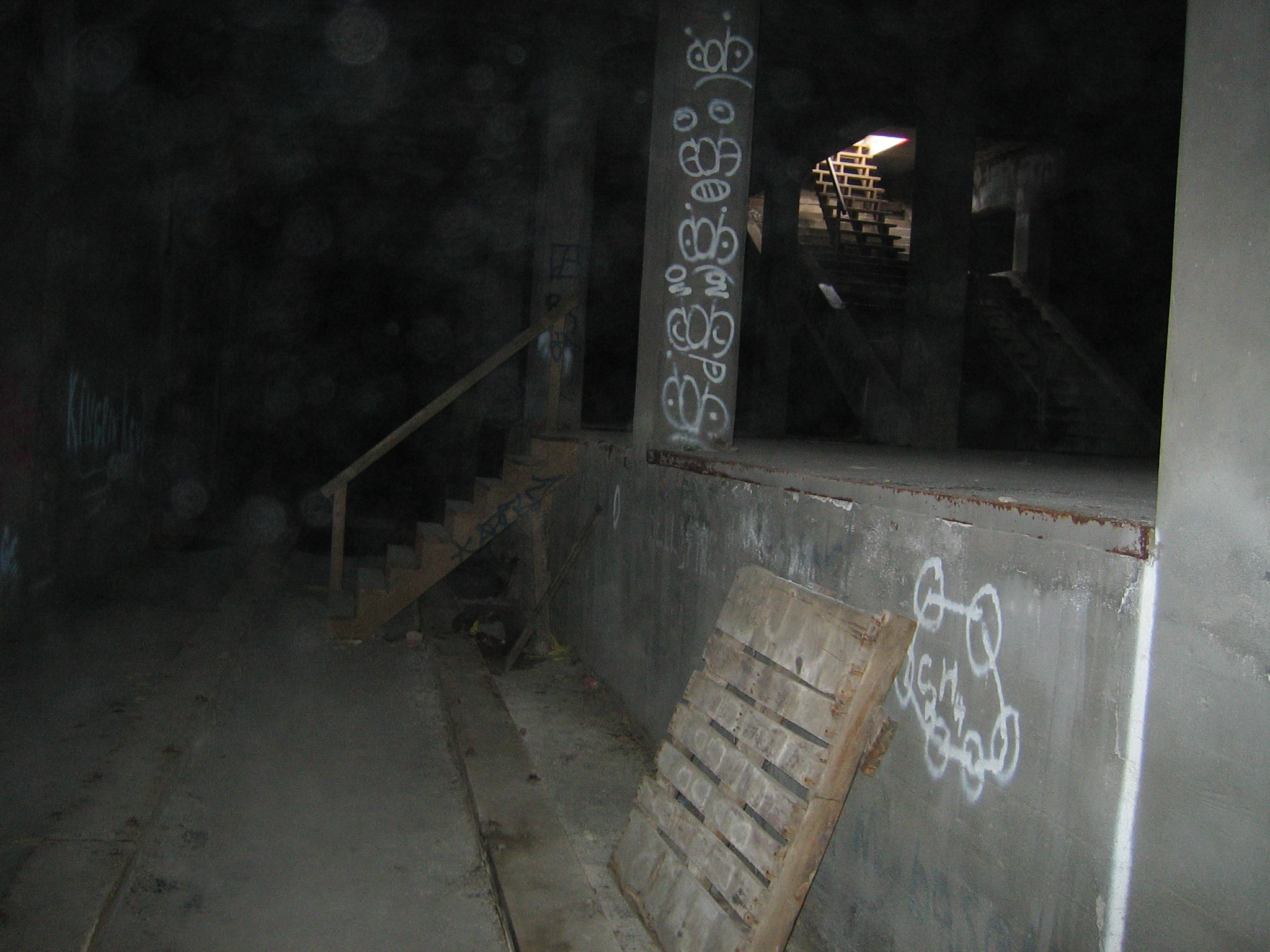
- A station platform and unlaid trackbed.

General information
- Location: Liberty Street & Central Parkway, Cincinnati, Ohio; United States
- Coordinates: 39°06′48″N 84°31′16″W
- Owner: City of Cincinnati
- Platforms: 2 side platforms
- Tracks: 2

History
- Opened: never opened

Services
Preceding station	Cincinnati Subway	Following station
Linn Street toward Clifton Avenue	Main Line	Race Street Terminus
Location

Liberty Street is an abandoned and never used subway station of the Cincinnati Subway. The station is the subject to a legend of it being retrofitted to be a fallout shelter capable of holding the entire population of Cincinnati. Fencing and lights were installed during this time period. The station was planned in 1916, but lacked funding to complete.

== History ==
Construction of the Cincinnati Subway began in the early 1900s to upgrade the Cincinnati Streetcar system, however due to political arguments, World War 1 and the Great Depression during the 1920s and 1930s, the construction of the subway system in Cincinnati was indefinitely cancelled, leaving all the stations of the subway to be abandoned. In the 1960s, Liberty Street station was converted into an underground nuclear bunker as a proposition by the Hamilton County, unfortunately the result was very weak because it would not provide much for those residing in it. There were also suggestions by investors to turn the tunnels into passages for freight trains, but the project failed due to the sharp turns existing in the tunnels that freight trains could not handle.

In 2002, the station was proposed to be part of the MetroMoves light rail system until the plans were rejected.

== Establishment ==
The entrance to the station is located near a former Warner Bros Pictures film distribution center in Cincinnati, Ohio with caution tape bordered over it.

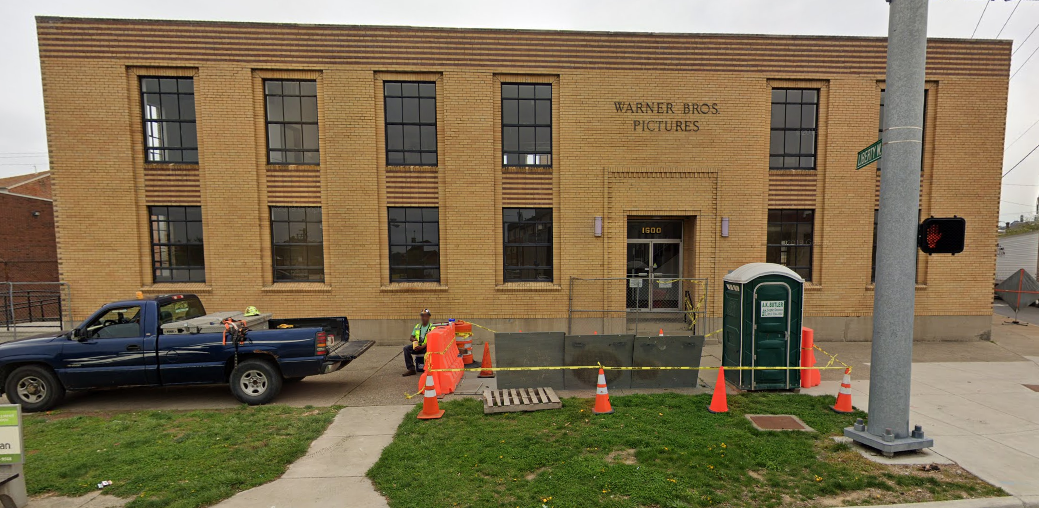
The entrance to Liberty Street station near a former Warner Bros Pictures film distribution center in Cincinnati, Ohio.

The east platform of the now-retrofitted bunker has lighting, ventilation, food, and communications equipment installed. The station's bunks were also placed in the station's bathrooms, and the platform was divided into several small rooms with cinder blocks with an erected chain link fence. At the platform edge, the tunnels weren't sealed off from the shelter, making it vulnerable to vandalism, particularly spray paint graffiti.

North up the outbound platform are two rows of pillars, the small rooms built between the wall and the first row of pillars. A room at the north end of the platform stretches almost to the platform edge. Another area along the back row of pillars was painted lime green, but not turned into a room. The bench was the only piece of furnishing installed in any of the stations. The shelter light fixtures on the ceiling still have bulbs in them, but the electricity has been cut off.

Inside the station is an empty ticket booth with empty window frames, a fuse or circuit breaker box, and graffiti on the walls.
