= Carl West Rich =

American politician

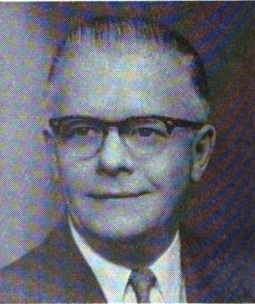

Member of the U.S. House of Representatives from Ohio's first district
- In office January 3, 1963 – January 3, 1965
- Preceded by: Gordon H. Scherer
- Succeeded by: John J. Gilligan

Mayor of Cincinnati
- In office 1947–1948
- Preceded by: James Garfield Stewart
- Succeeded by: Albert D. Cash
- In office 1951–1953
- Preceded by: Albert D. Cash
- Succeeded by: Edward N. Waldvogel
- In office 1955–1957
- Preceded by: Dorothy N. Dolbey
- Succeeded by: Charles Phelps Taft II

Personal details
- Born: September 12, 1898 Cincinnati, Ohio, U.S.
- Died: June 26, 1972 (aged 73) Cincinnati, Ohio, U.S.
- Resting place: Spring Grove Cemetery
- Party: Republican
- Education: University of Cincinnati College of Law

Carl West Rich (September 12, 1898 – June 26, 1972) was an American politician who served as Mayor of Cincinnati, three times from 1947 to 1948, 1951 to 1953, and 1955 to 1957 and Republican member of the U.S. House of Representatives from Ohio for one term from 1963 to 1965. He is the only Mayor of Cincinnati to go back to office two times.

== Life and career ==
Rich was born in Cincinnati, Ohio. He attended Walnut Hills High School, the University of Cincinnati College of Liberal Arts, A.B., in 1922, and from the college of law of the same university, LL.B., in 1924. He was admitted to the bar in 1924 and commenced the practice of law in Cincinnati. He was an instructor on the faculty of the University of Cincinnati, and an assistant city solicitor and assistant prosecutor of Cincinnati from 1925 to 1929. He served three terms as prosecuting attorney of Hamilton County, Ohio, from 1938 to 1947. He served nine years in the city council of Cincinnati and served as mayor for three terms, from 1947 to 1956. He was judge of the Common Pleas Court of Hamilton County, and president and chairman of the board of the Cincinnati Royals professional basketball team.

=== Congress ===
Rich was elected as a Republican to the Eighty-eighth Congress. He was an unsuccessful candidate for reelection in 1964 to the Eighty-ninth Congress. He resumed the practice of law and died in Cincinnati on June 26, 1972. He is interred in Spring Grove Cemetery.

== Sources ==
- United States Congress. "Carl West Rich (id: R000206)". Biographical Directory of the United States Congress.
- The Political Graveyard

Political offices
| Preceded by James G. Stewart | Mayor of Cincinnati, Ohio; 1947 | Succeeded by Albert D. Cash |
| Preceded by Albert D. Cash | Mayor of Cincinnati, Ohio; 1951-1953 | Succeeded by Edward N. Waldvogel |
| Preceded by Dorothy N. Dolbey | Mayor of Cincinnati, Ohio; 1954 | Succeeded by Charles Phelps Taft II |
U.S. House of Representatives
| Preceded by Gordon H. Scherer | Member of the U.S. House of Representatives from Ohio's 1st congressional district 1963 - 1965 | Succeeded by John J. Gilligan |
