= Dorothy N. Dolbey =

American politician from Ohio

Mayor of Cincinnati
- In office May 7, 1954 – November 10, 1954
- Preceded by: Edward N. Waldvogel
- Succeeded by: Carl West Rich

Personal details
- Born: April 28, 1908 Cincinnati, Ohio, U.S.
- Died: February 12, 1991 (aged 82) Hilton Head Island, South Carolina, U.S.
- Party: Charterite
- Education: University of Cincinnati

Dorothy N. Nichols Dolbey (April 28, 1908 – February 12, 1991) was an American politician who served as Mayor of Cincinnati for six months in 1954 and was also the first female mayor of Cincinnati.

Born in Cincinnati, Dolbey graduated from the University of Cincinnati and Columbia University with a degree in child psychology. After marrying James Dolbey in 1935, she became a stay-at-home mother, raising two children, but also served as the Cincinnati Council of Church Women United's president. In 1951, she first ran for city council, one of two women to do so, but failed to win a spot. Dolbey ran again in 1953, this time winning the election to city council. Entering the next council term, the Charter Party had a 5–4 advantage over the Republican Party in council, and as such, they were able to appoint the next mayor. Edward N. Waldvogel was named mayor while Dolbey was named vice-mayor.

Dolbey became the first woman in Major League Baseball history to throw out the Opening Day pitch in 1954, when the Cincinnati Reds had requested Waldvogel throw out the pitch. He was too ill to do so, so the honor was given to Dolbey. Waldvogel died a month later, and Dolbey became acting mayor until council could elect one, and she spent the next six months serving in that role. Council eventually re-appointed former mayor Carl West Rich to the position after 16 ballots; the previous 15 had been split between Rich, Dolbey, and a third nominee. Dolbey remained in city council until 1961, and retired from politics afterwards.
