= Friedrich Hassaurek =

American journalist and ambassador

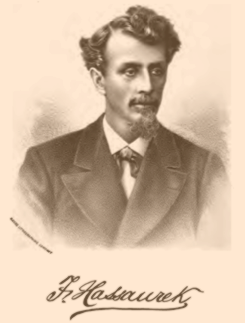

Personal details
- Born: October 8, 1831 Vienna
- Died: October 3, 1885 (aged 53) Paris
- Resting place: Spring Grove Cemetery

Friedrich Hassaurek (8 October 1831 – 3 October 1885) was an American journalist and ambassador.

== Biography ==
Hassaurek was born in Vienna, then in the Austrian Empire. He attended the Piaristen gymnasium. In the German revolutions of 1848, he served in the student legion, and was twice wounded. After the failure of the Vienna Rebellion in 1848, he came to the United States, settled in Cincinnati, Ohio, and engaged in journalism, politics, and the practice of law.

Hassaurek was prominent among campaigners for Abraham Lincoln during the 1860 presidential election. In Kentucky, to gain a hearing, he appealed to the hospitality of the people. In Dayton, Ohio, he threatened to stay a month and try night after night until given a chance to speak. At another time, being abused and pelted with stones and missiles of all kinds, he laid down a revolver, and threatened to shoot any one that advanced upon him. Having thus intimidated the rough element, he was permitted to speak.

On his non-career appointment by Lincoln as U. S. minister to Ecuador, Hassaurek went to thank the President "for appointing him to the highest position the administration had the power to give". (The capital city of Ecuador, Quito, is over 9,000 feet or 2,700 meters above sea level.) He served as minister from 1861 to 1865. In 1865, he became editor of the Cincinnati Volksblatt. He was a Liberal Republican for Horace Greeley in 1872, and in 1876 campaigned for Samuel J. Tilden.

He died in Paris while on a tour for his health. Leopold Markbreit was his half-brother.

== Works ==
- Four Years Among the Spanish-Americans (New York, 1868)
- The Secret of the Andes. Cincinnati, Robert Clarke & Company 1879 (Digital Version)

== Notes ==
Diplomatic posts
Preceded by Charles R. Buckalew	United States Minister Resident in Ecuador; July 15, 1861 – January 13, 1866	Succeeded by William T. Coggeshall
