= Leopold Markbreit =

American diplomat

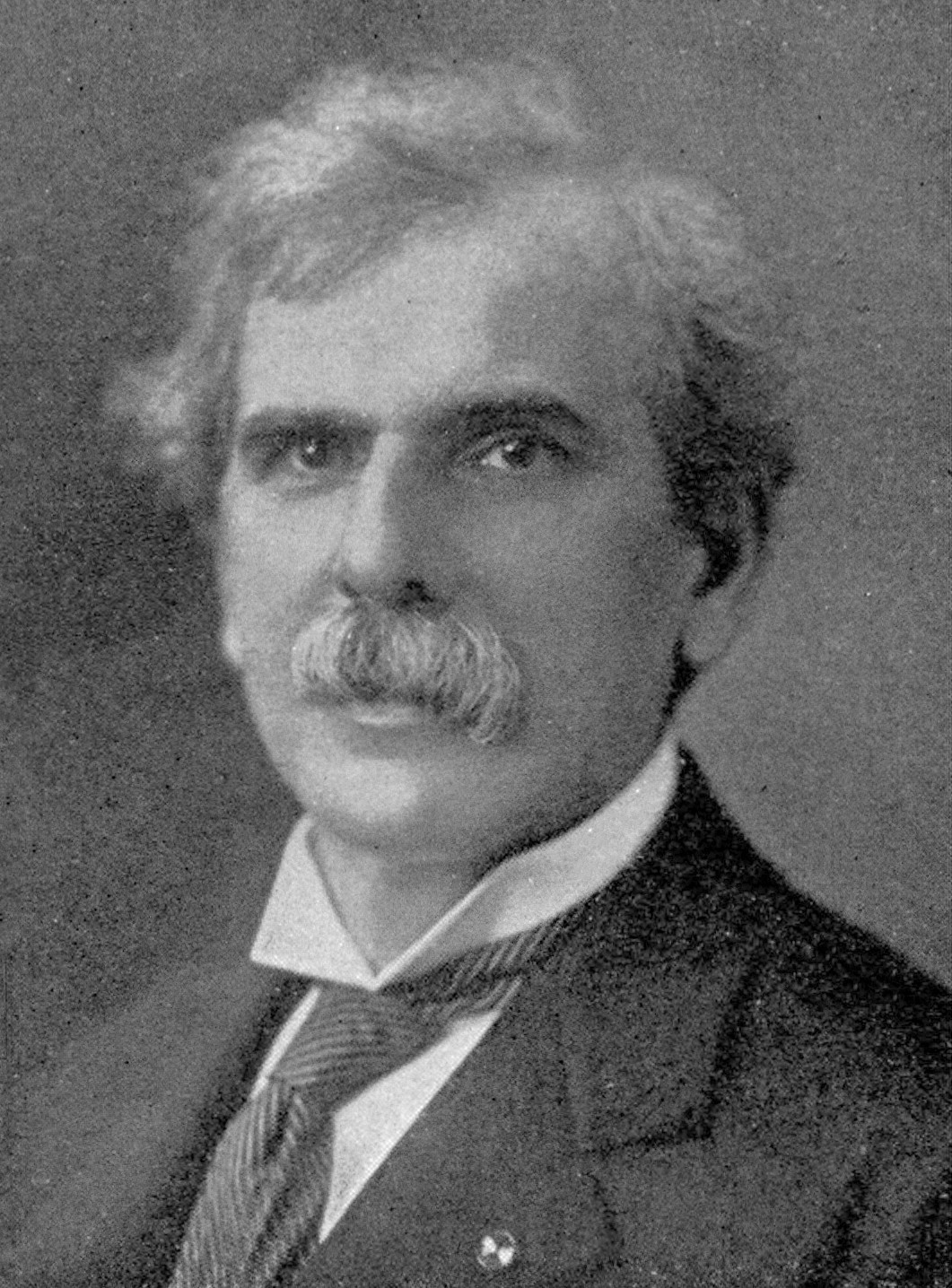

Mayor of Cincinnati
- In office 1908–1909
- Preceded by: Edward J. Dempsey
- Succeeded by: John Galvin

Personal details
- Born: March 13, 1842 Vienna
- Died: July 27, 1909 (aged 67)
- Resting place: Spring Grove Cemetery
- Party: Republican

Leopold Markbreit (March 13, 1842 – July 27, 1909) was an American Republican politician in Cincinnati, Ohio. The half-brother of Frederick Hassaurek, Markbreit was a lawyer who was briefly the law partner of Rutherford B. Hayes. President Ulysses S. Grant appointed him Minister to Bolivia in 1869. He later served as Mayor of Cincinnati from 1908 to 1909.

He served as a presidential elector in 1896 for McKinley and Hobart.

| Preceded by John W. Caldwell | United States Minister Resident, Bolivia; July 25, 1869 − February 12, 1873 | Succeeded by John T. Croxton |
