= George Puchta =

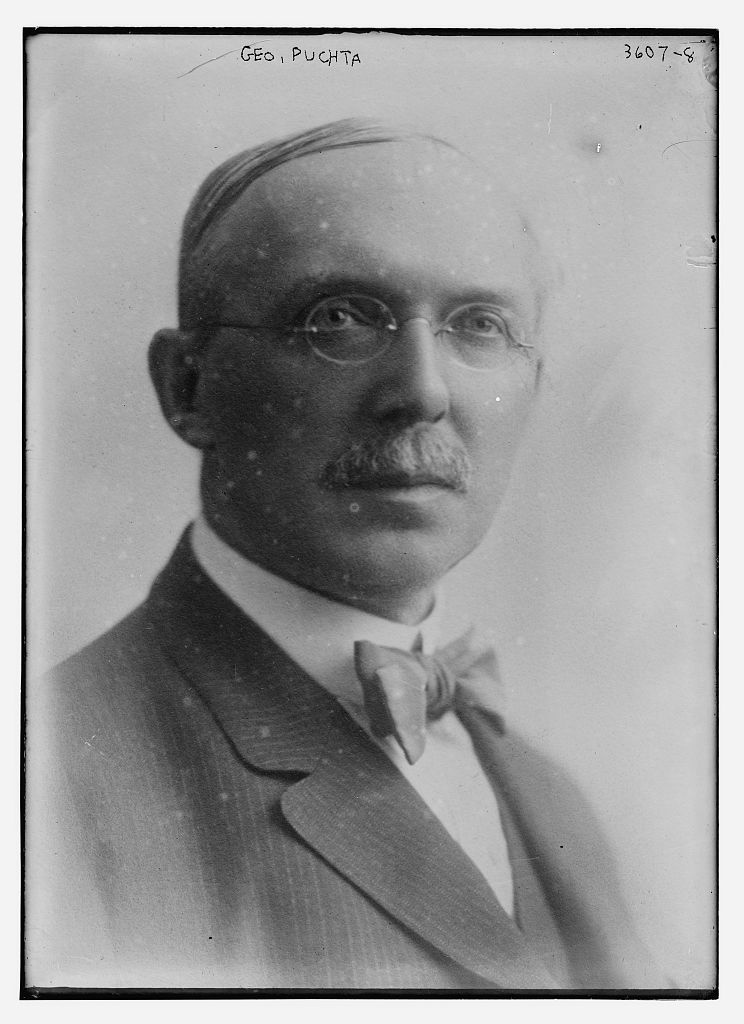
George Puchta circa 1915

George Puchta (April 8, 1860 - April 18, 1937) was the assistant Treasurer of the United States from 1911 to 1916 and the Mayor of Cincinnati, Ohio, from 1916 to 1917.

== Biography ==
He was born on April 8, 1860, in Cincinnati, Ohio, to Lorentz Puchta and Barbara K. Schmidt. On October 6, 1887, he married Anna M. Meinhardt.

Puchta was as the Cincinnati Park Commissioner from 1909 to 1911. He was appointed by President William H. Taft as the assistant treasurer for the United States Department of the Treasury from 1911 to 1916.

He was the Mayor of Cincinnati, Ohio, from 1916 to 1917. He became ill from "an abdominal ailment complicated by pneumonia" while aboard the SS President Coolidge and he died on April 18, 1937, in Manila.

Puchta was a presidential elector in the 1920, 1924, and 1928 presidential elections.
