= Race Street station (Cincinnati Subway) =

Abandoned subway station in Cincinnati, US

Race Street
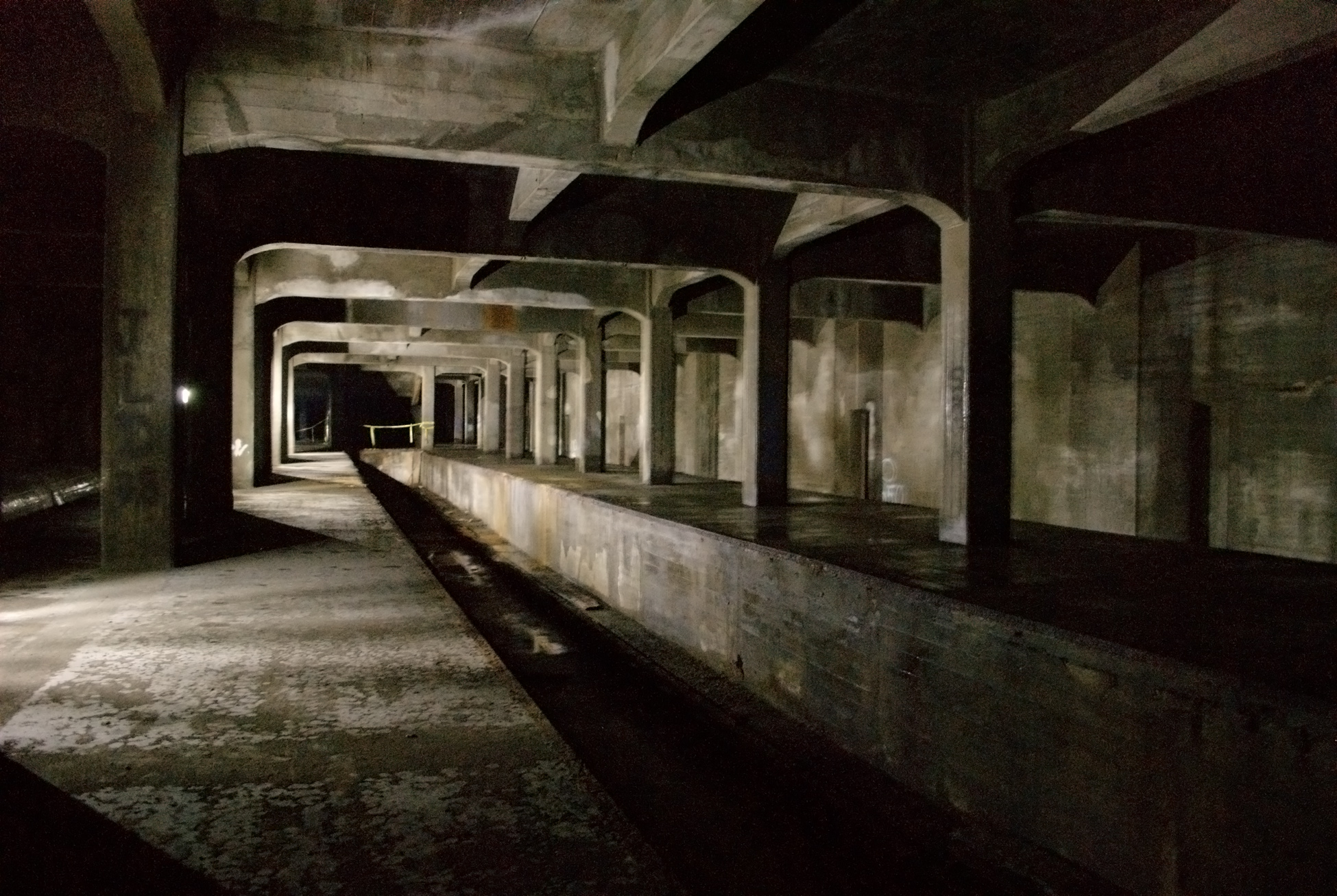
- Race Street station

General information
- Location: Race Street & Central Parkway, Cincinnati, Ohio; United States
- Coordinates: 39°06′25″N 84°30′58″W
- Owner: City of Cincinnati
- Platforms: 1 island platform
- Tracks: 2

History
- Opened: never opened

Services
Preceding station	Cincinnati Subway	Following station
Liberty Street toward Clifton Avenue	Main Line	Terminus
Location

Race Street station is a major station of the abandoned Cincinnati Subway in Cincinnati, Ohio, United States. The station was intended to be the hub of a planned 16-mile rapid transit system, the construction of which was indefinitely ceased in the late 1920s and never completed. The station is located at the intersection of Race Street and West Central Parkway, underneath a median strip on West Central Parkway. The station was planned in 1916, but was never completed due to lack of funding.

The Race Street Station is the largest station in the system, and would have been one of the main downtown hubs. It's the only station that has a central platform, and three tracks (the center track is a stub on either side). West of the station, the subway curves north for the potential line towards Norwood. This curve is regarded to be one of the sharpest curves in subway history. On both sides of the station, there are provisions for expansions, which includes a stub track under Plum Street connecting to the "southbound" track at the curve west of the station, as well as provisions east of the station for an extension towards Downtown and Oakley. The northernmost track would have been extended east under Central Parkway towards Oakley while the two other tracks curve south for an extension towards Fountain Square and Riverfront.
