= Cincinnati Subway =

Unfinished subway system in Ohio

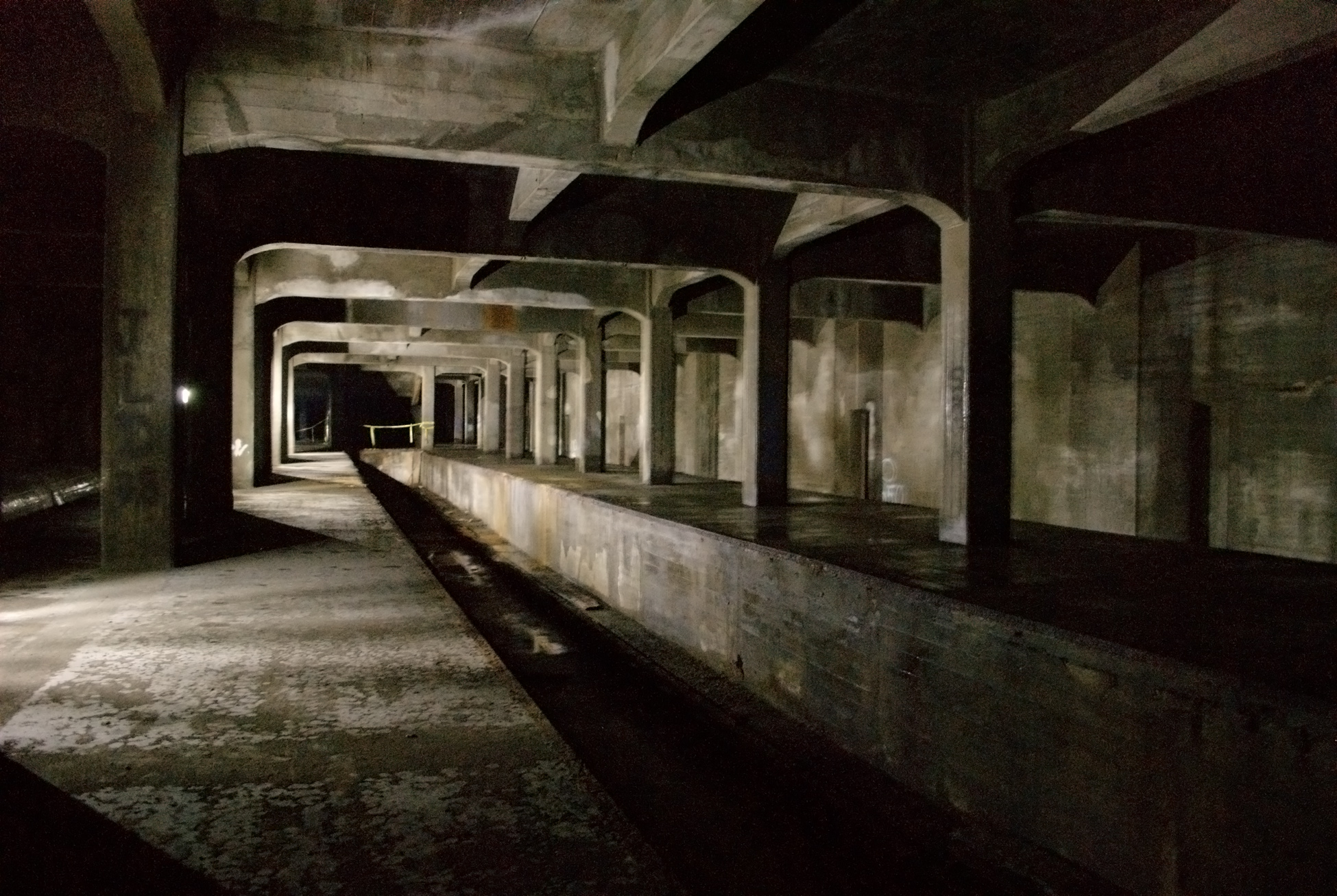
- Unfinished Race Street station

Overview
- Owner: SORTA
- Locale: Cincinnati, Ohio
- Transit type: Rapid transit
- Number of lines: 1
- Number of stations: 4

Operation
- Began operation: Never completed

Technical
- System length: 2.2 mi (3.5 km)

The Cincinnati Subway is a partially completed rapid transit system in Cincinnati, Ohio, planned as an upgrade to the Cincinnati streetcar system. 9.5 miles (15.3 km) of tracks were constructed, of which a slightly more than 2 miles (3.2 km) remain today, after sections were demolished for various projects. The remaining derelict tunnels and stations make up the largest abandoned subway tunnel system in the United States.

Construction began in the early 1900s, but was abandoned primarily due to escalating costs as a result of World War I and the Great Depression. Other contributing factors include collapse of funding amidst political bickering and the auto industry lobbying against public transit projects. The construction of the subway system was indefinitely canceled in 1928 and there are no plans to revive the original project. Numerous efforts and proposals have been made since the 1930s to repurpose the existing tunnels for other transportation projects, infrastructure, storage facilities, and commercial or community hubs.

== History ==
Subway route

Rapid transit was seen as the solution for downtown congestion in Cincinnati during the first quarter of the 20th century. Six million dollars were allocated for the project, but construction was delayed due to World War I. Unexpected post-war inflation doubled the cost of construction, so the project could not be finished at the original estimated price.

Various attempts to use the tunnels for mass transit have been unsuccessful. Political squabbling, the Great Depression, World War II, automaker lobbying and negative news media publicity have contributed to the failure of the proposals. Today, many Cincinnatians are unaware of the tunnels beneath them.

=== Context ===
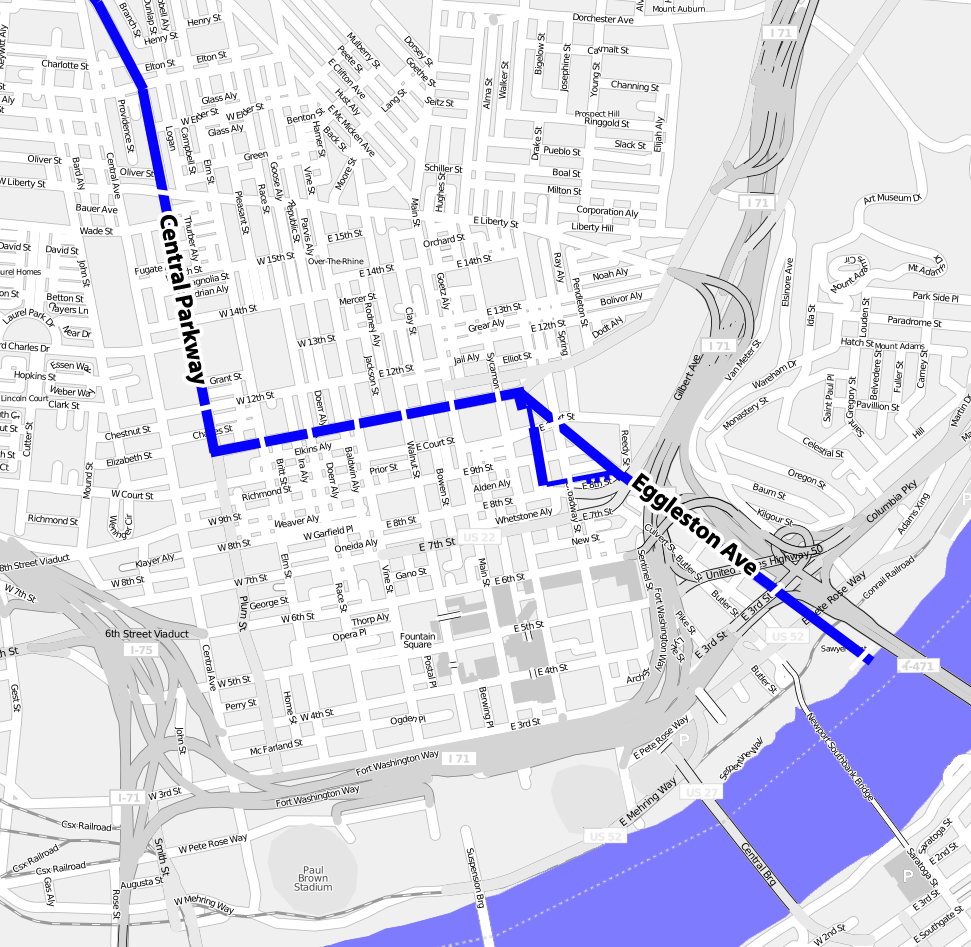
Former location of the Miami and Erie Canal in downtown Cincinnati

From 1825 to 1920 the Miami and Erie Canal divided Cincinnati's residential neighborhood of Over-the-Rhine from the business district of downtown. The canal was used to transport goods and people from the Great Lakes to the Ohio River and subsequently the Mississippi River via Cincinnati, until the popularity of railroads caused it to become disused. The canal then became very polluted due to people dumping trash in it and using it as a sewer. The canal became unprofitable by 1856 and was abandoned by the city in 1877.

On September 15, 1883, a weekly Cincinnati magazine called The Graphic proposed that the "dead old ditch" be used to provide an unobstructed route for a subway system, with a large boulevard above.

Cincinnati began adopting electric streetcars in 1888; this soon became the main form of public transportation. During this period Cincinnati was one of the seven most populous US cities and had a rate of growth and economic importance that was similar to that of New York City and Chicago. The slow streetcars shared the crowded streets with horse-drawn carriages and people, and collided with the first automobiles on an almost daily basis. It was not unusual for trips between downtown and the surrounding suburbs to take 45 minutes to an hour. Despite having 222 miles (357 km) of streetcar tracks, the city found itself in a growing traffic nightmare.

Another newspaper, the Cincinnati Commercial Tribune, gave encouraging words to the public and said "We believe that the city we love, our home, is at the turning point, and that with the coming of Rapid Transit we will have the beginning of a Greater, More Prosperous, Healthier and Happier Cincinnati. We believe that a Vote for the Loop is a Vote for the best interests of all of us, and it is with pride that we state that every newspaper in the city is for the Loop, and practically all of the Business organizations as well as the Trades Unions." This helped the project win the fight in the polls when the people of Cincinnati enthusiastically passed bill to start construction.

=== Planning ===
In 1910, Henry Thomas Hunt spearheaded plans for a new rapid transit system. The next year, City Council convinced the Ohio State Legislature to lease the city's portion of the canal for use as a boulevard and subway system. The city hired experts who had worked on Boston's and Chicago's rapid transit systems to research the best possible implementation for Cincinnati's rapid transit system. The result were four "Schemes", or proposed routes. The chosen plan—Scheme IV, modification H—looped around the city hitting the central suburbs of St. Bernard and Norwood, the eastern suburbs of Oakley and Hyde Park, and then returned into downtown.

In 1916, City Council authorized a bond issue of $6 million (Note: equivalent to $178 million in 2025 adjusted for inflation) with an interest rate of 4.25 percent, and then held a plebiscite on the rapid transit plan. The bond was supposed to fund a 16 miles (26 km) subway system stretching across Cincinnati, which would, in turn, slow or even stop the decline of Cincinnati's population at the time. One advertisement in support of the subway proclaimed, "Every newspaper in the city is for the Loop, and practically all of the Business organizations as well as the Trades Unions." On April 17, 1917, Cincinnati citizens voted in favor of using the bond for a Rapid Transit system, 30,165 to 14,286. The system would be built as a below grade, at grade and elevated railway, with the Underground portion to be built in the Miami and Erie Canal bed through downtown, and then extend through the Mill Creek valley to St. Bernard, Norwood, Oakley.

=== Proposed route: description from 1916 bond campaign ===
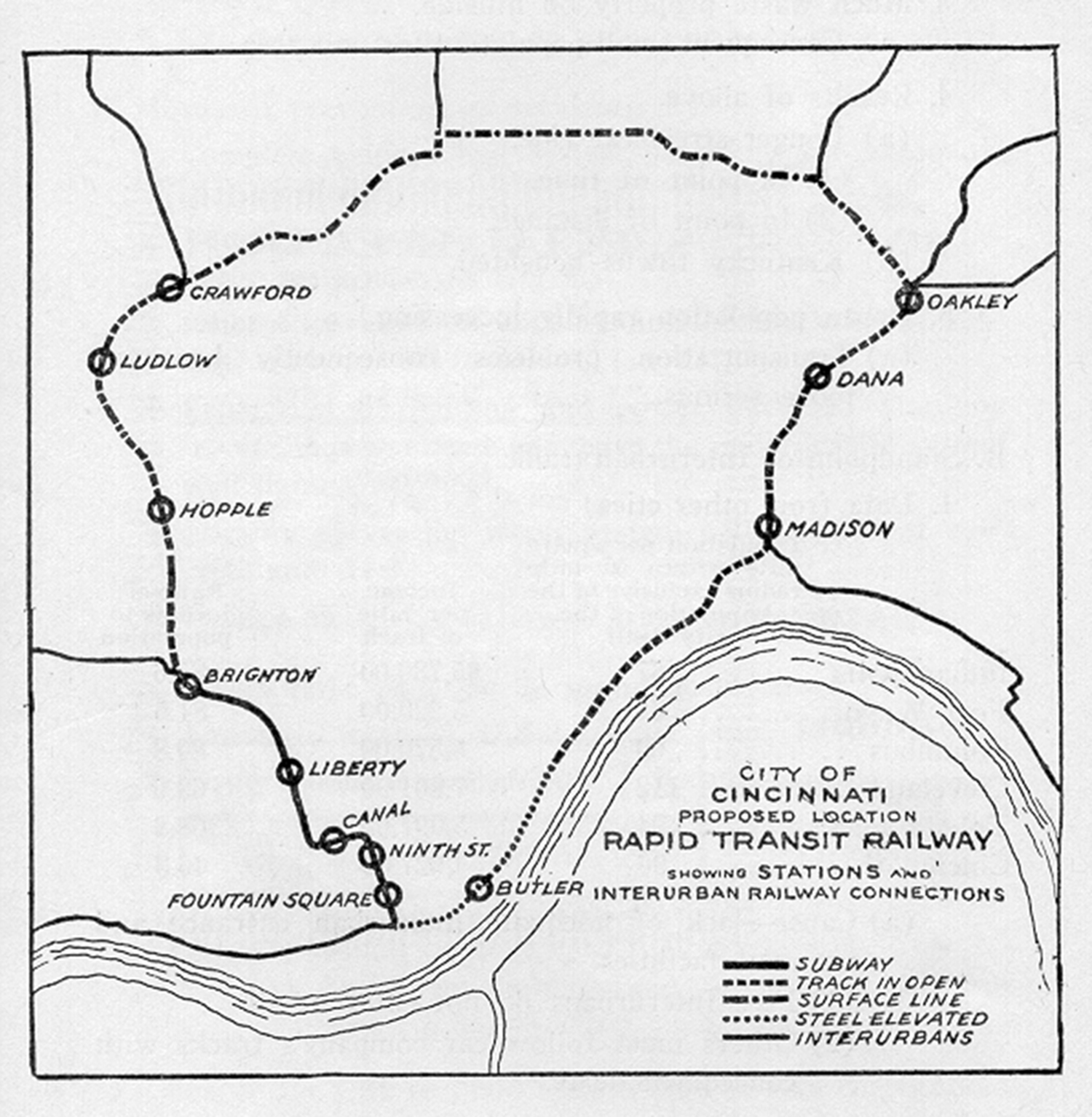
1. Follows canal bed from Walnut Street to Carthage Pike.
  1. Exceptions – Marshall Avenue, Bates Avenue and bend south of Ludlow Avenue, for the purpose of eliminating curves in canal bed that are so sharp as to be impossible to operate at high speed.
2. Subway: Fourth and Walnut Street to Brighton.
3. Open subway: Brighton to Bates Avenue.
4. Open cut or fill: Bates Avenue to Crawford Station.
  1. Necessary covered section for approaches to Boulevard.
    1. Sassafras Street.
    2. Brashers Street.
    3. Ludlow Avenue.
5. Open surface line in canal bed: Crawford Station to Carthage Pike, except at Mitchell Avenue, where it leaves canal bed and comes level to Mitchell Avenue.
6. Street surface Line: Carthage Pike, Tennessee Avenue, Maple Avenue, Smith Road.
7. Open cut or fill along Duck Creek Road on privet right of way: Oakley Station to Lake Avenue ravine (a short distance west of Potomac Avenue).
8. Open cut or fill in Lake Avenue ravine from Lake Avenue ravine to Owls Nest Park.
9. Subway under Owl's Nest Park and Madison Road.
10. Tunnel under Beechwood Subdivision (Wurlitzer Property).
11. Concrete trestle along Ohio River bluff to Eden Park Reservoir.
12. Steel elevated on Third, Martin, Pearl and Walnut Streets.
13. Passes from elevated to subway between Third and Fourth Street on Walnut Street.
14. Rapid Transit with no grade crossing from Oakley Station to Crawford Station by the way of downtown district.
15. High speed surface line from Crawford Station to Oakley Station on north side.

=== Proposed stations-Scheme Four: Description from 1916 bond campaign ===
1. Oakley Station; at junction of Smith Road and Duck Creek Road.
2. Dana Station; near intersection of Dana and Duck Creek Road.
3. Madison Station; at Madison Road, opposite Owl's Nest Park.
4. Butler Station; on Pearl Street, at Pennsylvania Station.
5. Fountain Square Station; under Walnut Street at Fountain Square.
6. Ninth Street Station; under Walnut Street, Between Eight and Ninth Street.
7. Canal Station; Canal Street, between Elm and Vine Street.
8. Liberty Station; in Canal bed, at Liberty Street.
9. Brighton Station; in Canal bed, at Crosstown Bridge.
10. Hopple Station; at the intersection of the Canal and Hopple Street.
11. Ludlow Station; at the south end of the Ludlow Avenue Viaduct.
12. Crawford Station; in the Canal Right of Way, opposite Spring Grove Cemetery.

However, because the United States entered World War I just 11 days earlier, construction was halted because no capital issues of bonds were permitted during the war.

War conditions have prompted the opinion in certain official quarters that it would be unwise to proceed with the construction of the loop until after the war. High costs of materials and the difficulty in obtaining deliveries are cited as arguments in favor of the temporary abandonment of the project.

— The Cincinnati Enquirer, "Subway Again May Meet Delay: Postponement Of Plans Until After War Is Considered," April 5, 1918 (p. 9)

=== Construction and failure ===
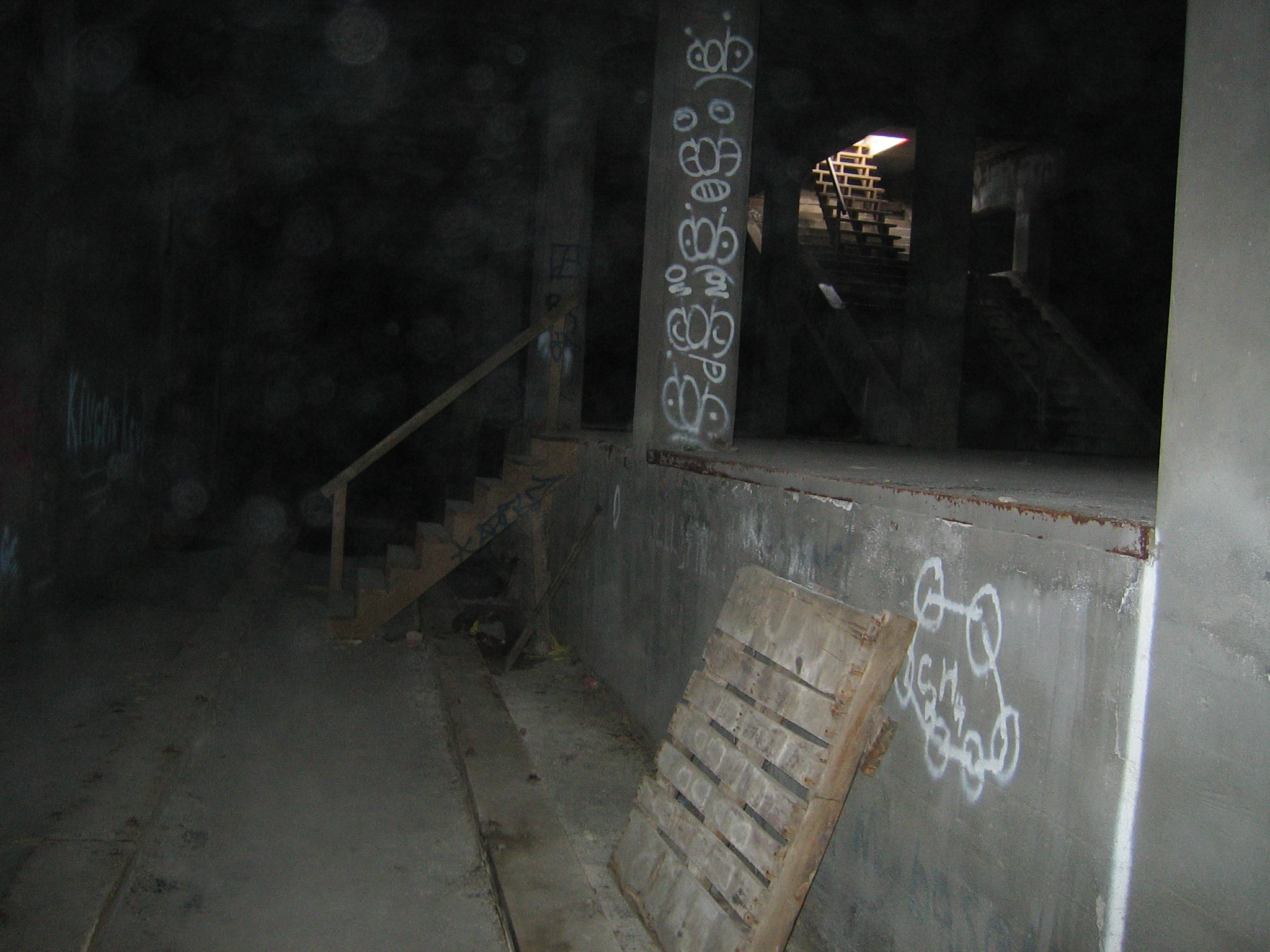
A station platform and unlaid trackbed in Liberty Street Station

When the war ended in 1918, costs had risen due to inflation. By 1919 the cost of construction had increased, bringing the original price to complete the loop from $12 million (Note: equivalent to $223 million in 2025 adjusted for inflation) to around $13 million. (Note: equivalent to $241 million in 2025 adjusted for inflation) Regardless, the city began work on January 28, 1920, at the current intersection of Walnut Street and Central Parkway, and the city planned to raise the money to complete the loop later, since funds were so low and there was a shortage in construction materials. The subway's construction caused the foundations of buildings along the route to crack, leading to much litigation against the subway. When funds ran out completely in 1927, construction ended with seven miles (11 km) of subway dug or graded, but no track had been laid. New estimates to complete the loop ranged from an additional $6–12 million. (Note: equivalent to between $111 million and $222 million in 2025 adjusted for inflation) The eastern part of the loop was later canceled as a cost-cutting measure. The boulevard that ran on top of the subway, Central Parkway, officially opened to traffic on October 1, 1928, and was followed by a week of public celebration. However, by the late 1920s, Prohibition had severely impacted the city, because alcoholic beverages, which were a major source of revenue for the city, were not allowed to be purchased. Still, as late as 1926 to 1927, new tunnels, such as the Hopple Street Tunnel, were being built.

Once it became apparent that the original rapid transit plan had failed, political infighting in City Hall stalled any new progress, due to an anti-City Hall campaign led by city manager Murray Seasongood beginning in 1920. Newspapers started to print articles arguing against the subway, using such rationales as the tight curves of the subway, and that its tunnels were too narrow to try to advocate against its completion.

Along with this, the cities of Norwood and Saint Bernard continuously negotiated with the city of Cincinnati, pushing construction back another year. Two more months were later piled on to the delay. Also, Brighton residents were upset with the blast damages destroying their property. The construction methods created suspicion to state examiners.

In January 1929, Seasongood – by then the Mayor – discontinued the Rapid Transit Commission, which until then had been in control of the subway's construction; that year, his own office took control of the project. Any hope of raising the money to complete the subway was further delayed with the stock market crash of 1929. Though few citizens owned automobiles when Mayor Hunt first planned rapid transit in 1910, their increasing usage helped fuel critics' arguments against a subway system. They began referring to the project as "Cincinnati's White Elephant." Even so, the "temporary" hiatus on construction was expected to end after the economy got better, and many Cincinnatians, including Seasongood, hoped that the subway would finally be completed.

=== Attempts at revival ===
There have been many attempts to complete the tunnels, but the reasons why the subway was never completed or used for another significant purpose are unclear. In 1936, the city commissioned the Engineers' Club of Cincinnati to produce a report on how to use the unfinished rapid transit property. The report could not find any use for the tunnels other than what they had been designed for. Because the city's needs had changed from twenty years earlier, the report suggested that the subway "should be forgotten". In 1939, the tunnels were researched for possible automobile traffic, but were found to be unsuitable for that use. In 1940, the city sought the advice of several experts to settle once and for all the fate of the subway. The report recommended placing all streetcar and trolley transportation underground (i.e., a subway), but Cincinnati already had too many other expensive public projects underway. In any case, the plan was put on hold yet again when the United States entered World War II in 1941.

During World War II, the city was focused on wartime rationing, so completing the subway was not a high priority. The tunnels were suggested as possible air raid shelters, and recent imagery of the now abandoned tunnels show old bunk-beds remain, suggesting it was used for this purpose. Underground storage of commercial and military supplies was also proposed as a use for the tunnels, or as a pathway to bring freight into the heart of the city, but both ideas were rejected because they would delay bringing mass transit to Cincinnati. After the war ended the City Planning Commission decided to not include the subway in its plans. Instead, the auto industry aggressively lobbied the commission to use the loop's right-of-way as pathways for Interstate 75 and the Norwood Lateral. Then, in the 1950s, a massive 52-inch (1.3 m) water main was laid in the northbound tunnel to save $300,000 (Note: equivalent to $3.31 million in 2025 adjusted for inflation) by not digging a new tunnel for the water main. According to the engineering firm Parsons Brinckerhoff, a redundant water main was installed during the construction of Fort Washington Way so the water main in the subway could be removed easily. There is also an escape clause in Ordinance No. 154-1956 that states, "in the event said section of the rapid transit subway is, at some future date, needed for rapid transit purposes, the Water Works shall remove said main at its sole cost."

During the height of the Cold War in the 1960s, Hamilton County proposed the Liberty Street station be turned into a bomb shelter. However, the result was a very weak attempt at a fallout shelter that would not have provided much for those residing in it. There were also suggestions by investors to turn the tunnels into passages for freight trains, but that project failed due to the sharp turns existing in the tunnels that freight trains could not handle.

The subway bonds were paid off in 1966 at a total cost of $13,019,982.45. Around that time Meier's Wine Cellars Inc. wanted to use the subway tunnels to store wine, as well as install a bottling operation to draw tourists, but it fell through due to a lack of proper building codes. In the 1970s Nick Clooney wanted to turn parts of the tunnel into an underground mall and a night club, but that fell through early on due to insurance issues. In the 1980s the city pitched the tunnels to Hollywood filmmakers as a location to shoot subway scenes. In particular, the location was presented to the makers of Batman Forever, but as of 2008 the tunnels had not been used in any feature films.

In 2002, a regional light rail system was proposed to use the tunnels; the system would cost $2.6 billion (Note: equivalent to $4.65 billion in 2025 adjusted for inflation) and take thirty years to build. The tunnels were favored because they were in an ideal location, they could easily be used to connect the east side and the west sides of Cincinnati, and they would have saved the city at least $100 million (Note: equivalent to $179 million in 2025 adjusted for inflation) in construction costs at the time. The light rail plan, called MetroMoves, proposed a tax levy that would have raised sales tax in Hamilton county by a half-cent. The plan was voted down by more than a 2-to-1 ratio, with 68% opposing MetroMoves. Still, an underground portion of the Riverfront Transit Center was built to serve the proposed, unbuilt MetroMoves lines; this transit center was later utilized by another Cincinnati streetcar line, the Cincinnati Bell Connector.

In 2017, shortly after the 100th anniversary of the tunnel construction, mayoral candidate Rob Richardson Jr. ran unsuccessfully on a platform that included reviving the subway system; however, this did not provide tangible construction plans or feasibility studies.

In late 2024, the city issued a Request for Information on possible uses for the tunnel.

== Current status ==
The uncompleted subway tunnels and stations have been described as "in good shape." This is partially credited to the original construction quality, and partially because Cincinnati needs to maintain the tunnel, using tax revenues, due to the presence of Central Parkway on top of it.

In 2008 it was estimated that it would cost $2.6 million (Note: equivalent to $3.89 million in 2025 adjusted for inflation) to simply keep maintaining the tunnels, $19 million (Note: equivalent to $28.4 million in 2025 adjusted for inflation) to fill the tunnels with dirt, and $100.5 million (Note: equivalent to $157 million in 2025 adjusted for inflation) to revive the tunnels for modern subway use. Relocating the 52-inch (1.3 m) water main would cost $14 million. (Note: equivalent to $20.9 million in 2025 adjusted for inflation) As of August 2016, the abandoned tunnel is used to carry the relocated water main and some optical fiber cables.

The abandoned tunnels are frequently visited by urban explorers and the homeless.

=== Stations and route ===
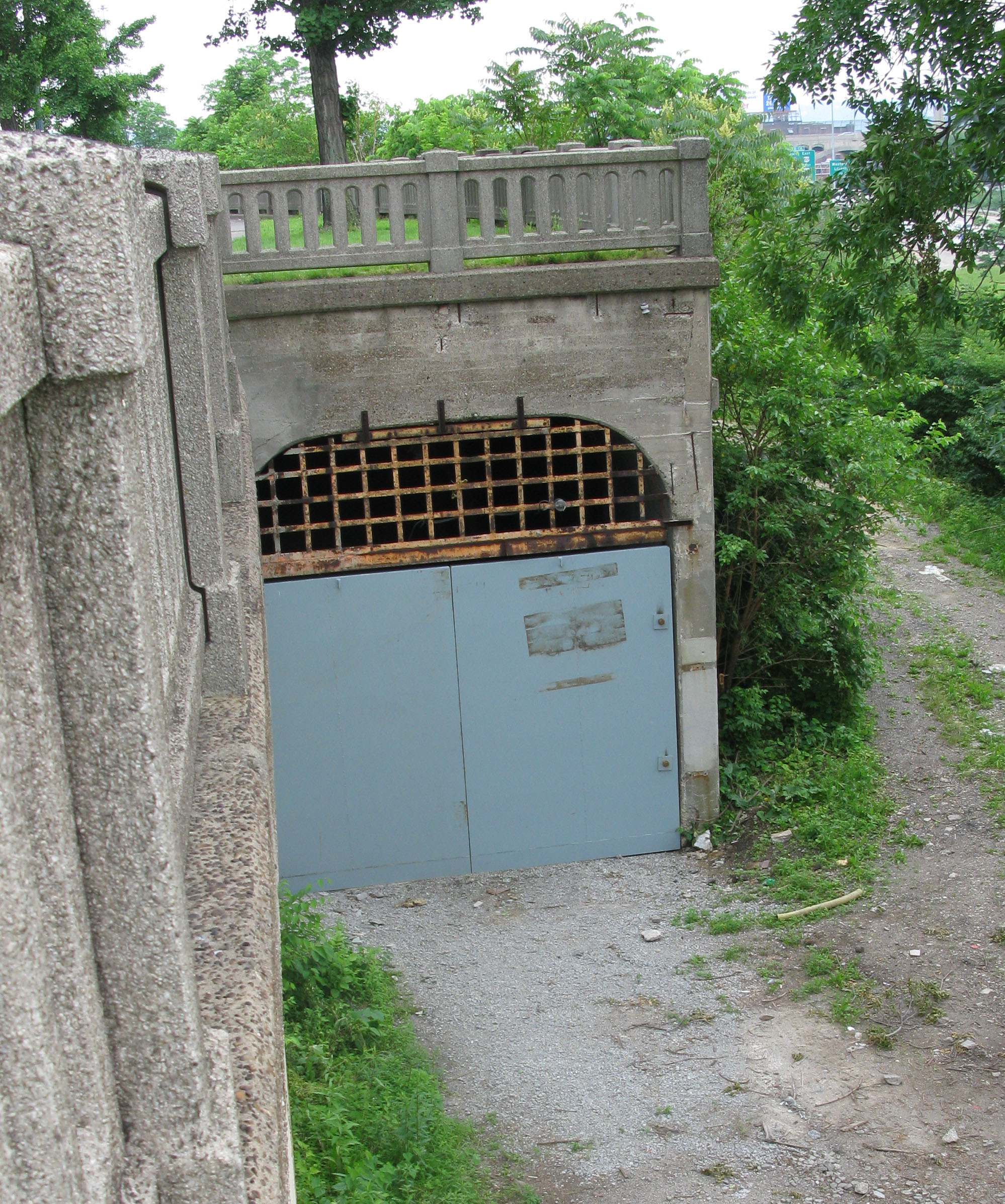
A tunnel entrance near the Western Hills Viaduct is clearly visible from Interstate 75

Seven stations were completed along Central Parkway: four underground and three above ground. The underground stations remain intact, but the above-ground stations were demolished when I-75 was built in the 1960s. The underground stations' locations are at Race Street, Liberty Street, Linn Street, and Brighton Place, while the above-ground stations' locations were at Marshall Street, Ludlow Avenue, Clifton Avenue, and Reading Road.

The first station was the Race Street station, which was to serve as the main hub. It was configured with the platform in the center, with the subway running along the north and south side. Next was Liberty Street, which was a through-station. It was a simple design with a platform on each side of the track. Third was Linn Street, also a through station. Laid out similarly to Liberty Street, this station has been sealed up, and can be easily missed when walking through. Fourth was Brighton Place, another through-station.

Marshall Street was the most grand of the above-ground stations, located to the west near the Mill Creek Valley. Ludlow Avenue Station was constructed under the south side of the Ludlow Viaduct and was also a through-station. The last to be completed was Clifton Avenue, which was located where the street passes under present day I-75. There were additional stations in the plan; however, funding ran out as the project reached Norwood.

=== Engineering ===
The subway tunnels run north and south. Each of the two halves of the tube has a minimum width of 13 feet (4.0 m) and a height of 15 feet 6 inches (4.72 m). Each tunnel has parallel wooden stringers which are bolted to the floor, and are intended to support steel rails that were never laid. They are 59 inches (1.5 m) from center to center, which is 2.5 inches (64 mm) wider than most railway lines. All curves in the tunnel are gradual, and on those curves the outside stringer was raised higher than the inner stringer to accommodate trains traveling at speeds of more than 40 miles per hour (64 km/h).

There were many details of the unfinished subway system, such as a provision for a station at Mohawk Corner, where the wall has been set back. At Walnut Street the lines begin to curve south to go into downtown, but they are stopped short by a bricked-up wall. The subway tunnel is double-tracked throughout its entire length, with a concrete wall separating the two tracks. Openings in the wall enable persons to step from one track to another. The tunnels are well ventilated and provide much light until Liberty Street is reached.

== See also ==
- List of rapid transit systems
- Riverfront Transit Center, a rarely used transportation center in Cincinnati
- Streetcars in Cincinnati
- Rochester subway, a similarly abandoned frieght and rapid transit rail line in Rochester, New York.
