= Henry Thomas Hunt =

Mayor of Cincinnati, Ohio

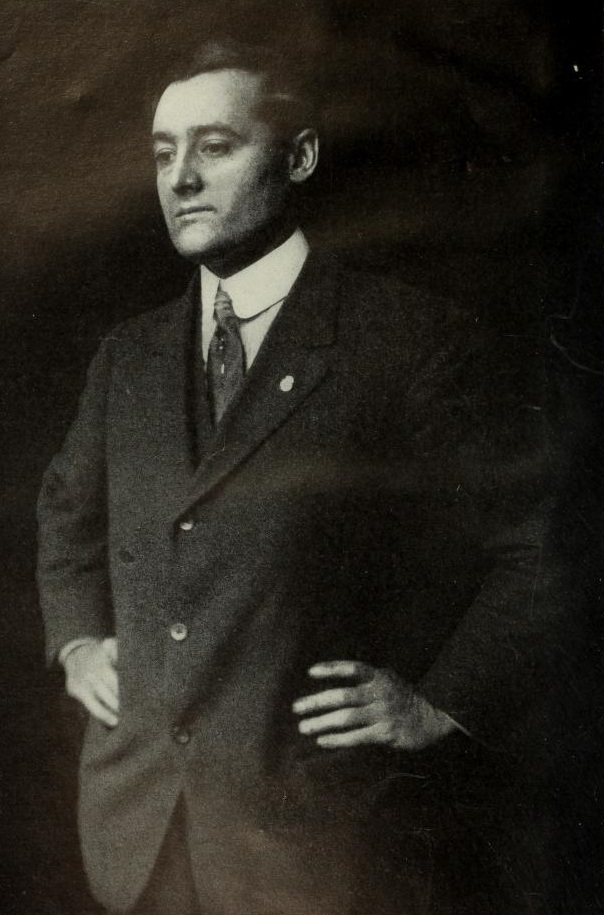

Mayor of Cincinnati, Ohio
- In office 1912–1913
- Preceded by: Louis Schwab
- Succeeded by: Frederick S. Spiegel

Personal details
- Born: April 29, 1878 Cincinnati, Ohio, US
- Died: February 28, 1956 (aged 77) Martinsburg, West Virginia, US
- Resting place: Arlington National Cemetery
- Party: Democratic
- Spouse(s): Thomasa Haydock; Eleanor Phelps
- Children: 3
- Education: Yale University; Cincinnati Law School
- Profession: Attorney

Military service
- Branch/service: U. S. Army
- Rank: Major
- Battles/wars: World War I

Henry Thomas Hunt (April 29, 1878 – February 28, 1956) was the mayor of Cincinnati, Ohio from 1912 to 1913. Hunt, 33 years old when he took office, quickly became known as the Boy Mayor. Failing to win re-election, he moved to New York City where he became a successful attorney.

== Early life ==
Henry and his younger brother, Philip Woodward Hunt (born November 15, 1882), were born to Samuel Hunt (born August 7, 1848), president of the Cincinnati, Portsmouth & Virginia Railroad Company, and Martha Trotter Hunt who were Quakers. After graduating from Yale University in 1900, Henry Hunt received a law degree from Cincinnati Law School in 1903.

== Political career ==
Hunt began his political career by joining the Committee of Nine, a group of young, idealistic neophytes bent on reforming a corrupt political system that had controlled Cincinnati and Hamilton County for decades. George B. Cox, known far and wide as Boss Cox, ran the entrenched political machine. In 1904, Hunt was appointed to a committee organized to separate school management from political influence. In 1905, as a member of the Honest Election Committee, Hunt helped lead a municipal election campaign focused on the elimination of Bossism. Also in 1905, Henry Hunt was nominated by the Democrats to stand for the Ohio House of Representatives, winning election as part of a reformist landslide that swept Cox's men out of office.

In November 1908, Hunt was elected prosecuting attorney for Hamilton County. During Hunt's term, Boss Cox tried to obstruct him at every turn. Nevertheless, Hunt prevailed more often than not, closing gambling rooms and driving slot machines out of the county. In 1910, Hunt was re-elected to another two-year term. In 1911, Hunt's persistence and successes prompted Cox to issue a surprising announcement. Later that year, he would retire from political life.

Henry Hunt was nominated to stand for mayor of Cincinnati on the Reform Democratic ticket, winning the November 1911 election.

=== Mayor ===
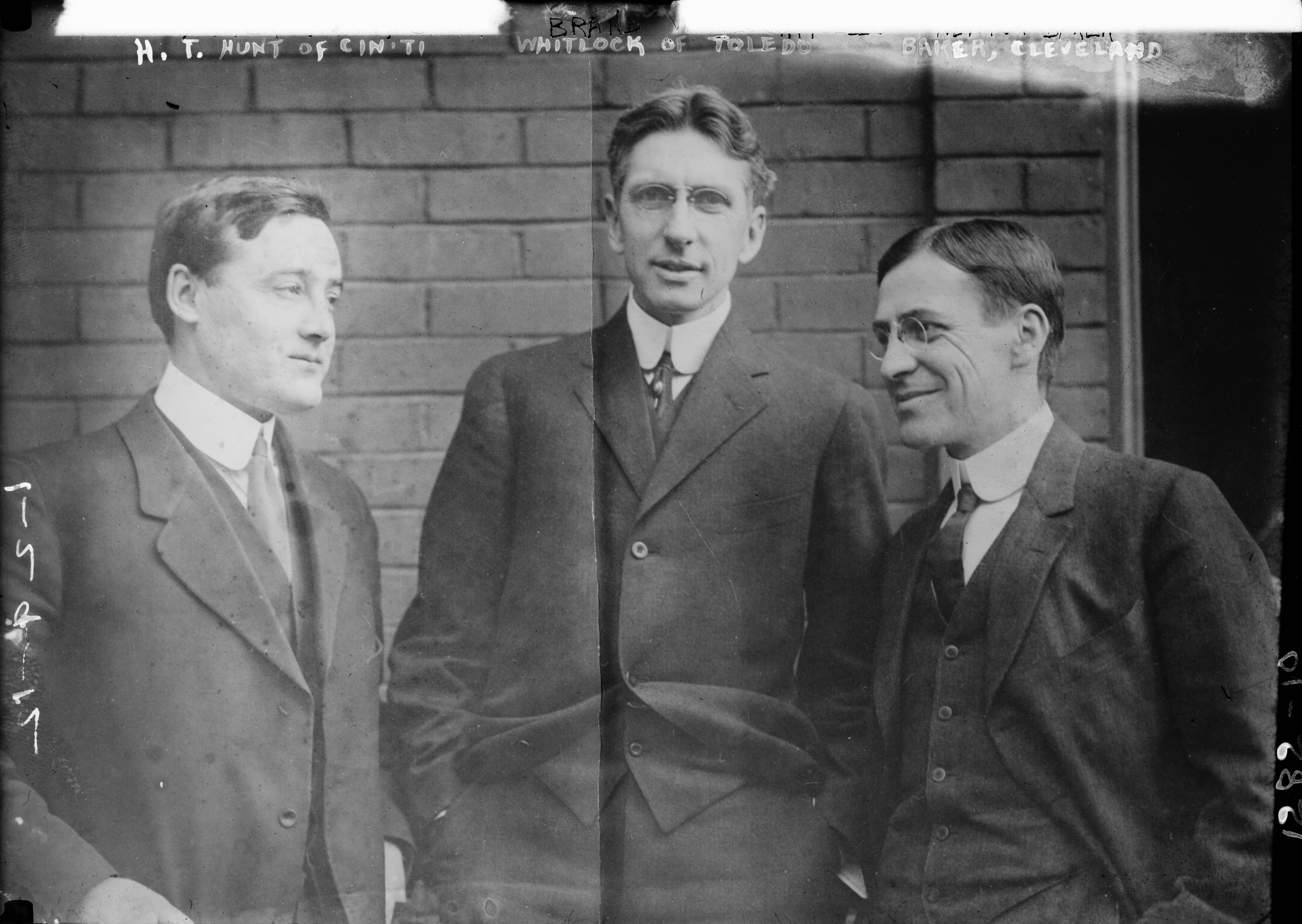
"The Holy Trinity", as Ohio mayors (left to right) Henry Thomas Hunt of Cincinnati, Brand Whitlock of Toledo, and Newton D. Baker of Cleveland were called, following the mayoral elections of November 4, 1911.

The New York Times of September 24, 1913 characterized the two-year term of Henry T. Hunt as "a remarkable record." They concluded that the voters have "no choice save to re-elect Mayor Hunt." The achievements of Mayor Henry T. Hunt were:

- Settling a street railway strike and a strike of ice men
- Introducing inspections of tenement houses
- Appointing school nurses
- Providing for food inspection and dental service for school children
- Separating the dependent children from the delinquents in the House of Refuge
- Providing that all the children had a chance to go to school and to Sunday school
- Confronting the loan sharks until they were driven from Cincinnati
- Rooting out many abuses and sources of disease in the densely populated parts of the city
- Increased regulation and control of the corrupt administration under Boss Cox
- Suppressing gambling and closing many gambling resorts
- Rerouting the street railway lines and constructing a terminal boulevard and belt line of surface cars
- Abolishing dangerous grade crossings
- Introducing a plan to improve city sewers
- Opposing the corrupt and powerful Republican organization dominated by Boss Cox

One summer afternoon, Hunt saved a teenager's life:

Mayor Henry Hunt was standing on a street corner this afternoon, when a runaway team approached at breakneck speed. Mabel Hartford, a pretty girl of 18, was crossing the street at the time, unmindful of danger.

The Mayor jumped into the street, seized the girl and pushed her out of danger. Then he caught the bridle of one of the horses and held on. He was dragged several yards, but was not injured. After bringing the team to a standstill he continued on his way to Fountain Square, where he opened the Made-in-Cincinnati Exposition.

== Later career ==
After losing a bid for re-election as mayor, Hunt enlisted in the Army and served during World War I, reaching the rank of major. In 1922, Henry Hunt entered the practice of law in New York City.

== Personal life ==
Henry T. Hunt married Thomasa Haydock (born September 22, 1885), daughter of Thomas T. Haydock of Cincinnati. They had three children: Barbara Carter Hunt (September 26, 1908 - July 4, 1952), Henry Thomas Hunt (born c. November, 1909) and Samuel Pancoast Hunt (born August 7, 1911). On May 8, 1920, Mrs. Thomasa Haydock Hunt filed suit in Cincinnati for a divorce from Henry T. Hunt.

In September, 1925, Henry T. Hunt married Eleanor M. Phelps (May 15, 1899–September 22, 1983). They lie buried beside each other in Arlington National Cemetery.

== References and notes ==
- The New York Times, April 29, 1912.
- Miller, Zane L. (1968). Boss Cox's Cincinnati: urban politics in the progressive era. Oxford University Press, LC #68-29722. Reprint: Ohio State University Press (2000)
