= 2020 United States House of Representatives elections in Ohio =

- November 3, 2020

All 16 Ohio seats to the United States House of Representatives
	Majority party	Minority party
Party	Republican	Democratic
Last election	12	4
Seats won	12	4
Seat change	Steady	Steady
Popular vote	3,252,887	2,451,500
Percentage	56.46%	42.55%
Swing	▲4.46%	▼4.72%

Republican
50–60%
60–70%
70–80%
80–90%
Democratic
50–60%
60–70%
70–80%
80–90%
Tie
40–50%

The 2020 United States House of Representatives elections in Ohio were held on November 3, 2020, to elect the 16 U.S. representatives from the state of Ohio, one from each of the state's 16 congressional districts. The elections coincided with the 2020 U.S. presidential election, as well as other elections to the House of Representatives, elections to the United States Senate and various state and local elections. Primaries were held on April 28, 2020.

== Results summary ==
=== Statewide ===
Party	Candi- dates	Votes		Seats		
Party	Candi- dates	No.	%	No.	+/–	%
Republican Party	16	3,252,887	56.46%	12	Steady	75.00%
Democratic Party	16	2,451,500	42.55%	4	Steady	25.00%
Libertarian Party	5	56,515	0.98%	0	Steady	0.00%
Write-in	6	379	0.01%		Steady	0.00%
Total	43	5,761,270	100.00%	16	Steady	100.00%

Popular vote
Republican	56.46%
Democratic	42.55%
Other	0.99%

House seats
Republican	75.00%
Democratic	25.00%

=== District ===
Results of the 2020 United States House of Representatives elections in Ohio by district:

District	Republican		Democratic		Others		Total		Result
District	Votes	%	Votes	%	Votes	%	Votes	%	Result
District 1	199,560	51.80%	172,022	44.65%	13,703	3.55%	385,285	100.00%	Republican hold
District 2	230,430	61.08%	146,781	38.91%	37	0.01%	377,248	100.00%	Republican hold
District 3	93,569	29.14%	227,420	70.83%	103	0.03%	321,092	100.00%	Democratic hold
District 4	235,875	67.91%	101,897	29.34%	9,584	2.75%	347,356	100.00%	Republican hold
District 5	257,019	68.00%	120,962	32.00%	0	0.00%	377,981	100.00%	Republican hold
District 6	249,130	74.41%	85,661	25.59%	0	0.00%	334,791	100.00%	Republican hold
District 7	236,607	67.50%	102,271	29.17%	11,671	3.33%	350,549	100.00%	Republican hold
District 8	246,277	68.95%	110,766	31.01%	114	0.04%	357,157	100.00%	Republican hold
District 9	111,385	36.91%	190,328	63.07%	39	0.02%	301,752	100.00%	Democratic hold
District 10	212,972	58.36%	151,976	41.64%	0	0.00%	364,948	100.00%	Republican hold
District 11	60,323	19.95%	242,098	80.05%	0	0.00%	302,421	100.00%	Democratic hold
District 12	241,790	55.24%	182,847	41.78%	13,035	2.98%	437,672	100.00%	Republican hold
District 13	148,648	44.94%	173,631	52.48%	8,522	2.58%	330,801	100.00%	Democratic hold
District 14	238,864	60.10%	158,586	39.90%	0	0.00%	397,450	100.00%	Republican hold
District 15	243,103	63.41%	140,183	36.57%	75	0.02%	383,361	100.00%	Republican hold
District 16	247,335	64.52%	144,071	37.58%	0	0.00%	391,406	100.00%	Republican hold
Total	3,252,887	56.46%	2,451,500	42.55%	56,883	0.99%	5,761,270	100.00%	

== District 1 ==
2020 Ohio's 1st congressional district election
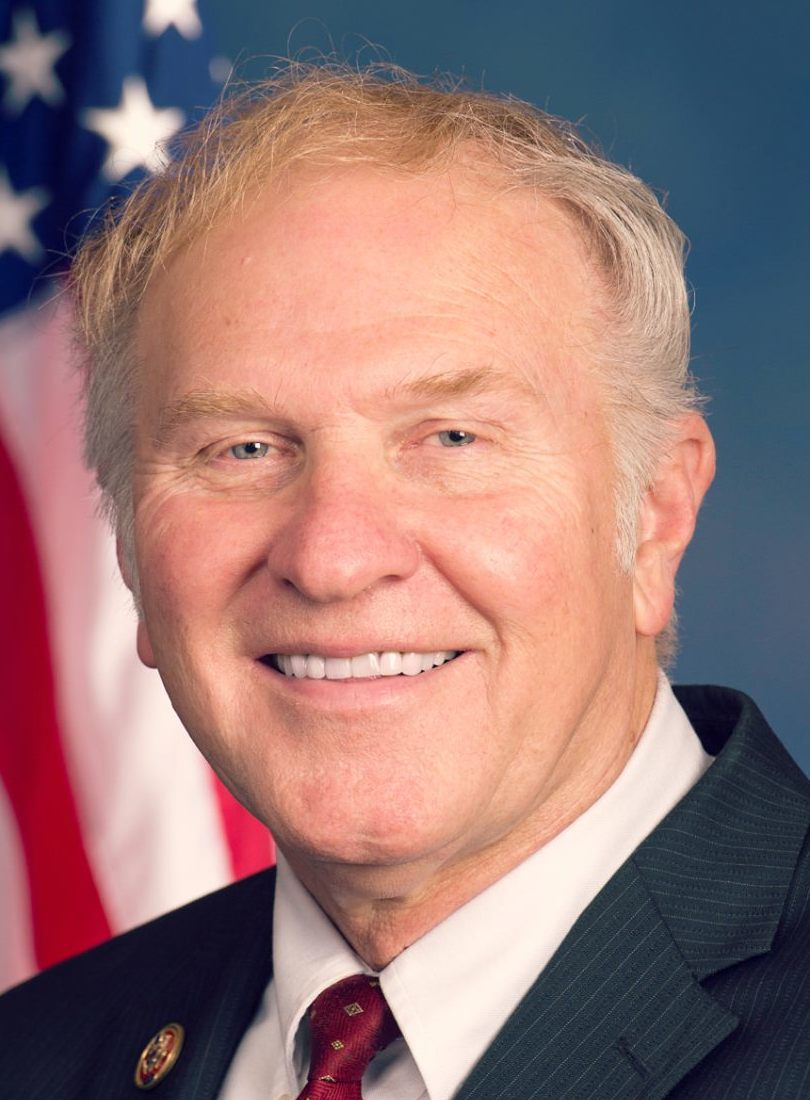

Nominee	Steve Chabot	Kate Schroder
Party	Republican	Democratic
Popular vote	199,560	172,022
Percentage	51.8%	44.7%
- Chabot: 40–50% 50–60% 60–70% 70–80% 80–90% Schroder: 40–50% 50–60% 60–70% 70–80% 80–90% ≥90%
U.S. Representative before election
Steve Chabot
Republican
Elected U.S. Representative
Steve Chabot
Republican

The 1st district is based in Cincinnati, stretching southwestward to Ohio's borders with Kentucky and Indiana. The incumbent was Republican Steve Chabot, who was re-elected with 51.3% of the vote in 2018.

=== Republican primary ===
==== Candidates ====
===== Nominee =====
- Steve Chabot, incumbent U.S. representative

===== Declined =====
- Rocky Boiman, ESPN football analyst and former Green Township trustee
- Amy Murray, Cincinnati city councilwoman

==== Endorsements ====
Steve Chabot

Organizations

- Club for Growth

==== Primary results ====
Republican primary results
Party	Candidate	Votes	%
Republican	Steve Chabot (incumbent)	44,746	100.0
Total votes		44,746	100.0

=== Democratic primary ===
==== Candidates ====
===== Nominee =====
- Kate Schroder, health care executive

===== Eliminated in primary =====
- Nikki Foster, businesswoman and U.S. Air Force veteran

===== Declined =====
- Denise Driehaus, president of the Hamilton County Board of Commissioners and former state representative
- Brigid Kelly, state representative (endorsed Schroder)
- Aftab Pureval, attorney, Hamilton County Clerk of Courts and nominee for this seat in 2018
- Alicia Reece, former state representative
- Jill Schiller, former special assistant in the White House Office of Management and Budget and nominee for the 2nd District in 2018

==== Endorsements ====
Nikki Foster

State legislators

- Connie Pillich, former Ohio state representative and 2018 gubernatorial candidate (campaign chair)

Organizations

- ASPIRE PAC
- New Politics
- United Airlines pilots CLE LEC 172
- VoteVets.org
Kate Schroder

Former US Executive Branch officials

- Barack Obama, former president of the United States (2009-2017, former Senator from Illinois (2005-2008)

State legislators

- Sedrick Denson, state representative
- Catherine Ingram, state representative
- Eric Kearney, former state senator
- Brigid Kelly, state representative
- Cecil Thomas, state senator

Organizations

- League of Conservation Voters
- National Women's Political Caucus
- Sierra Club

Local officials

- Pete Buttigieg, former mayor of South Bend, Indiana (2012–2020) and former candidate for 2020 Democratic presidential nomination
- John Cranley, Mayor of Cincinnati
- Mark Mallory, former Mayor of Cincinnati
- Nan Whaley, Mayor of Dayton

==== Primary results ====
Democratic primary results
Party	Candidate	Votes	%
Democratic	Kate Schroder	36,579	67.6
Democratic	Nikki Foster	17,520	32.4
Total votes		54,099	100.0

=== Third parties ===
==== Libertarian Party ====
===== Candidates =====
- Kevin David Kahn (Libertarian)

===== Results =====
Libertarian primary results
Party	Candidate	Votes	%
Libertarian	Kevin David Kahn	266	100.0
Total votes		266	100.0

=== General election ===
==== Post-primary endorsements ====
Kate Schroder (D)

Organizations

- EMILY's List

==== Polling ====
Poll source	Date(s) administered	Sample size (Note: Key: A – all adults RV – registered voters LV – likely voters V – unclear)	Margin of error	Steve Chabot (R)	Kate Schroder (D)	Other	Undecided
Change Research	October 29 – November 1, 2020	505 (LV)	± 4.6%	47%	45%	6% (Note: Kahn (L) with 3%; "Don't recall" with 2%; Did not vote with 1%; would not vote with 0%)	2%
Normington, Petts & Associates (D) (Note: Poll sponsored by the House Majority PAC, which endorsed Schroder prior to this poll's sampling period.)	August 30 – September 3, 2020	400 (LV)	± 4.9%	46%	50%	–	–
Lake Research Partners (D) (Note: Poll sponsored by the DCCC)	July 13–15, 2020	400 (LV)	± 4.9%	46%	47%	–	–
GQR Research (D) (Note: Poll conducted for the Schroder campaign.)	June 29 – July 2, 2020	605 (LV)	± 3.98%	48%	46%	–	–
DCCC Targeting and Analytics Department (D)	April 29–30, 2020	455 (LV)	± 4.6%	50%	43%	–	7%

==== Predictions ====
Source	Ranking	As of
The Cook Political Report	Tossup	October 2, 2020
Inside Elections	Tilt D (flip)	October 28, 2020
Sabato's Crystal Ball	Lean D (flip)	November 2, 2020
Politico	Tossup	October 11, 2020
Daily Kos	Tossup	October 6, 2020
RCP	Likely R	October 5, 2020
Niskanen	Lean R	July 26, 2020

==== Results ====
Ohio's 1st congressional district election, 2020
Party	Candidate	Votes	%
Republican	Steve Chabot (incumbent)	199,560	51.8
Democratic	Kate Schroder	172,022	44.7
Libertarian	Kevin David Kahn	13,692	3.5
Write-in		11	0.0
Total votes		385,285	100.0
Republican hold			

== District 2 ==
2020 Ohio's 2nd congressional district election
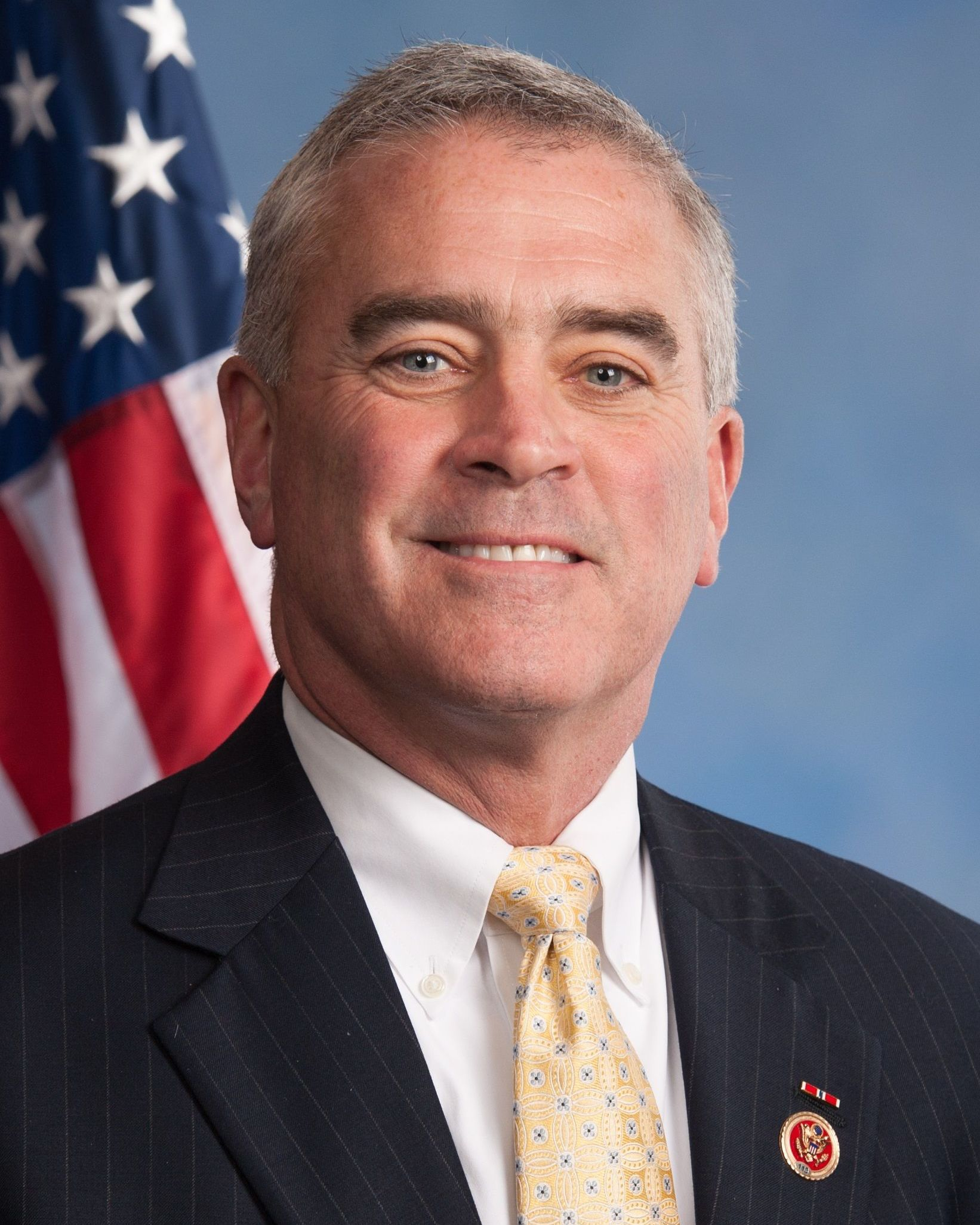

Nominee	Brad Wenstrup	Jaime Castle
Party	Republican	Democratic
Popular vote	230,430	146,781
Percentage	61.1%	38.9%
- Wenstrup: 50–60% 60–70% 70–80% 80–90% Castle: 50–60% 60–70% 70–80% 80–90% >90% Tie: 50% No votes
U.S. Representative before election
Brad Wenstrup
Republican
Elected U.S. Representative
Brad Wenstrup
Republican

The 2nd district takes eastern Cincinnati and its suburbs, including Norwood and Loveland, and stretches eastward along the Ohio River. The incumbent was Republican Brad Wenstrup, who was re-elected with 57.6% of the vote in 2018.

=== Republican primary ===
==== Candidates ====
===== Nominee =====
- Brad Wenstrup, incumbent U.S. Representative

===== Eliminated in primary =====
- H. Robert Harris

==== Primary results ====
Republican primary results
Party	Candidate	Votes	%
Republican	Brad Wenstrup (incumbent)	53,674	94.2
Republican	H. Robert Harris	3,326	5.8
Total votes		57,000	100.0

=== Democratic primary ===
==== Candidates ====
===== Nominee =====
- Jaime Castle, teacher

==== Primary results ====
Democratic primary results
Party	Candidate	Votes	%
Democratic	Jaime Castle	40,956	100.0
Total votes		40,057	100.0

=== General election ===
==== Predictions ====
Source	Ranking	As of
The Cook Political Report	Safe R	July 2, 2020
Inside Elections	Safe R	June 2, 2020
Sabato's Crystal Ball	Safe R	July 2, 2020
Politico	Safe R	April 19, 2020
Daily Kos	Safe R	June 3, 2020
RCP	Safe R	June 9, 2020
Niskanen	Safe R	June 7, 2020

==== Endorsements ====
Jaime Castle (D)

Organizations

- National Women's Political Caucus

==== Results ====
Ohio's 2nd congressional district election, 2020
Party	Candidate	Votes	%
Republican	Brad Wenstrup (incumbent)	230,430	61.1
Democratic	Jaime Castle	146,781	38.9
Write-in		37	0.0
Total votes		377,248	100.0
Republican hold			

== District 3 ==
2020 Ohio's 3rd congressional district election
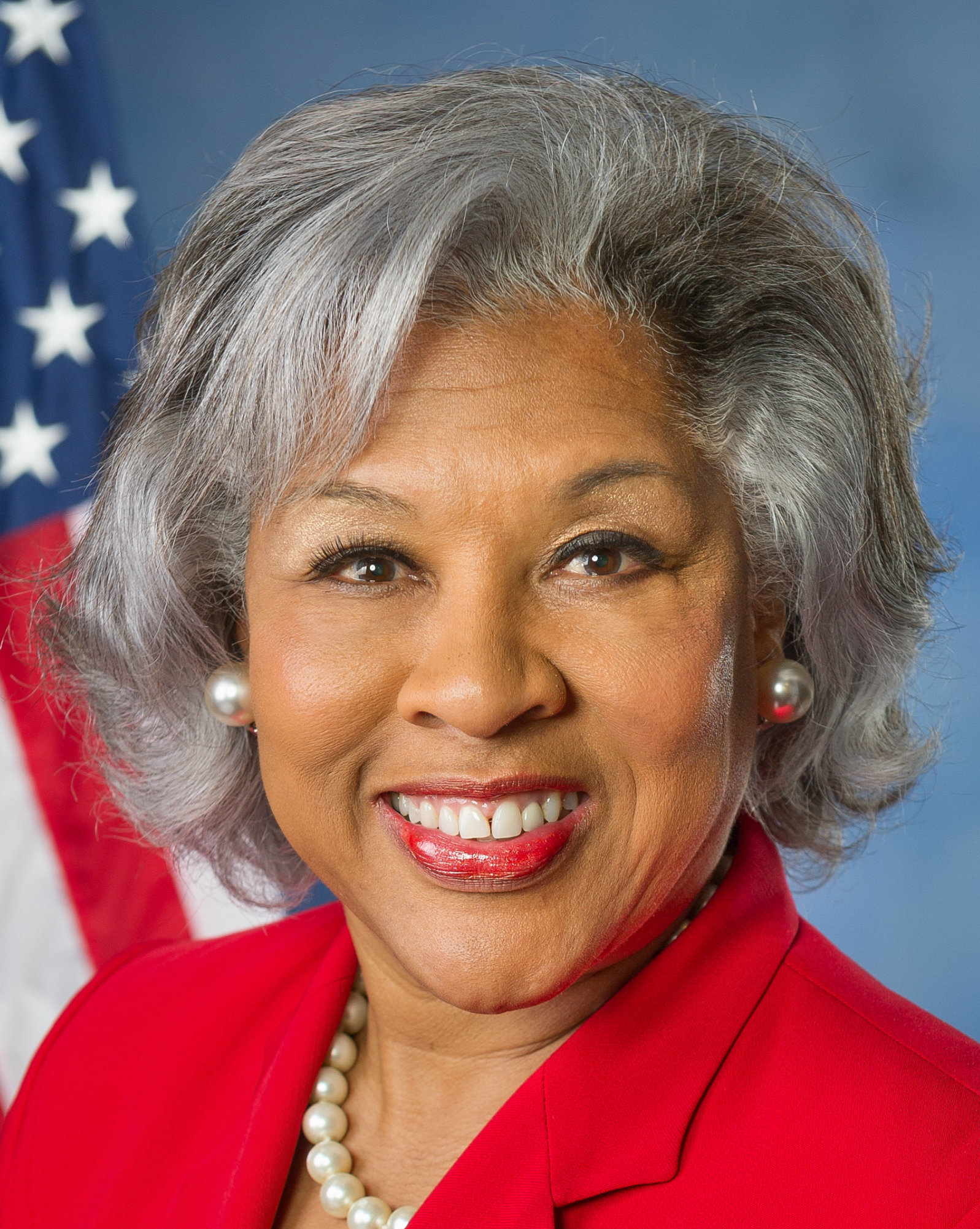

Nominee	Joyce Beatty	Mark Richardson
Party	Democratic	Republican
Popular vote	227,420	93,569
Percentage	70.8%	29.2%
- Precinct results Beatty: 50–60% 60–70% 70–80% 80–90% ≥90% Richardson: 50–60% 60–70% 70–80% 80–90% ≥90%
U.S. Representative before election
Joyce Beatty
Democratic
Elected U.S. Representative
Joyce Beatty
Democratic

The 3rd district is located entirely within the borders of Franklin County, taking in inner Columbus, Bexley, Whitehall, as well as Franklin County's share of Reynoldsburg. The incumbent was Democrat Joyce Beatty, who was re-elected with 73.6% of the vote in 2018.

=== Democratic primary ===
==== Candidates ====
===== Nominee =====
- Joyce Beatty, incumbent U.S. Representative

===== Eliminated in primary =====
- Morgan Harper, former special adviser to the director of the Consumer Financial Protection Bureau

===== Endorsements =====
Joyce Beatty

Organizations

- League of Conservation Voters
- Population Connection
- Sierra Club
Morgan Harper

Organizations

- 350 Action
- Brand New Congress
- Justice Democrats
- Progressive Change Campaign Committee
- Sunrise Movement

Parties

- Working Families Party

==== Primary results ====
Democratic primary results
Party	Candidate	Votes	%
Democratic	Joyce Beatty (incumbent)	44,995	68.1
Democratic	Morgan Harper	21,057	31.9
Total votes		66,052	100.0

=== Republican primary ===
==== Candidates ====
===== Nominee =====
- Mark Richardson, U.S. Navy veteran

===== Eliminated in primary =====
- Cleophus Dulaney, businessman

==== Primary results ====
Republican primary results
Party	Candidate	Votes	%
Republican	Mark Richardson	11,451	86.4
Republican	Cleophus Dulaney	1,797	13.6
Total votes		13,248	100.0

=== General election ===
==== Post-primary endorsements ====
Joyce Beatty (D)

Organizations

- National Women's Political Caucus

==== Predictions ====
Source	Ranking	As of
The Cook Political Report	Safe D	July 2, 2020
Inside Elections	Safe D	June 2, 2020
Sabato's Crystal Ball	Safe D	July 2, 2020
Politico	Safe D	April 19, 2020
Daily Kos	Safe D	June 3, 2020
RCP	Safe D	June 9, 2020
Niskanen	Safe D	June 7, 2020

==== Results ====
Ohio's 3rd congressional district election, 2020
Party	Candidate	Votes	%
Democratic	Joyce Beatty (incumbent)	227,420	70.8
Republican	Mark Richardson	93,569	29.2
Write-in		103	0.0
Total votes		321,092	100.0
Democratic hold			

== District 4 ==
2020 Ohio's 4th congressional district election
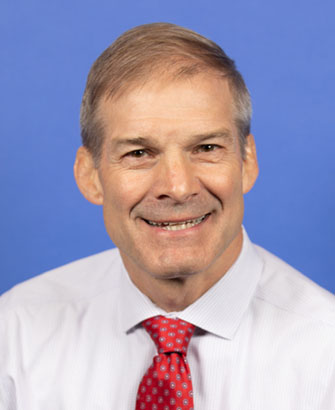

Nominee	Jim Jordan	Shannon Freshour
Party	Republican	Democratic
Popular vote	235,875	101,897
Percentage	67.9%	29.3%
- Jordan: 40–50% 50–60% 60–70% 70–80% 80–90% ≥90% Freshour: 40–50% 50–60% 60–70% 70–80% 80–90% ≥90%
U.S. Representative before election
Jim Jordan
Republican
Elected U.S. Representative
Jim Jordan
Republican

The 4th district, nicknamed the "duck district", sprawls from the Columbus exurbs, including Marion and Lima into north-central Ohio, taking in Oberlin. The incumbent was Republican Jim Jordan, who was re-elected with 65.3% of the vote in 2018.

=== Republican primary ===
==== Candidates ====
===== Nominee =====
- Jim Jordan, incumbent U.S. representative

==== Endorsements ====
Jim Jordan

Organizations

- Ohio Republican Party

==== Primary results ====
Republican primary results
Party	Candidate	Votes	%
Republican	Jim Jordan (incumbent)	64,695	100.0
Total votes		64,695	100.0

=== Democratic primary ===
==== Candidates ====
===== Nominee =====
- Shannon Freshour, litigation paralegal

===== Eliminated in primary =====
- Mike Larsen, television program scriptwriter and former Congressional staffer
- Jeffrey Sites, Army veteran and assistant manager of shipping and receiving for a company in Findlay

==== Endorsements ====
Shannon Freshour

Individuals

- Charlie Adler, voice actor, director and activist
- Rosie O'Donnell, comedian and television personality
Mike Larsen

Individuals

- Drew Carey, actor and comedian
- Alyssa Milano, actress
- Dan Povenmire, director, writer, producer, artist, voice actor, executive producer and showrunner of Milo Murphy's Law
- Jackie Speier, U.S. representative from CA-14
- Mary Ellen Withrow, 40th treasurer of the United States and 42nd treasurer of Ohio
Jeffrey Sites

Individuals

- Judd Apatow, filmmaker, actor and comedian
- Thomas Lennon, actor
- Seth P. Waxman, 41st solicitor general of the United States
- Tim Wirth, former United States Senator from Colorado

==== Primary results ====
Democratic primary results
Party	Candidate	Votes	%
Democratic	Shannon Freshour	18,078	47.5
Democratic	Jeffrey Sites	11,037	29.0
Democratic	Mike Larsen	8,944	23.5
Total votes		38,059	100.0

=== Third parties ===
==== Libertarian Party ====
===== Candidates =====
- Steve Perkins

===== Results =====
Libertarian primary results
Party	Candidate	Votes	%
Libertarian	Steve Perkins	214	100.0%
Total votes		214	100.0%

==== Independents ====
===== Candidates =====
- Chris Gibbs (independent), grain farmer and former chair of the Shelby County Republican Party

=== General election ===
==== Predictions ====
Source	Ranking	As of
The Cook Political Report	Safe R	July 2, 2020
Inside Elections	Safe R	June 2, 2020
Sabato's Crystal Ball	Safe R	July 2, 2020
Politico	Safe R	April 19, 2020
Daily Kos	Safe R	June 3, 2020
RCP	Safe R	June 9, 2020
Niskanen	Safe R	June 7, 2020

==== Results ====
Ohio's 4th congressional district election, 2020
Party	Candidate	Votes	%
Republican	Jim Jordan (incumbent)	235,875	67.9
Democratic	Shannon Freshour	101,897	29.3
Libertarian	Steve Perkins	9,854	2.8
Total votes		347,626	100.0
Republican hold			

== District 5 ==
2020 Ohio's 5th congressional district election
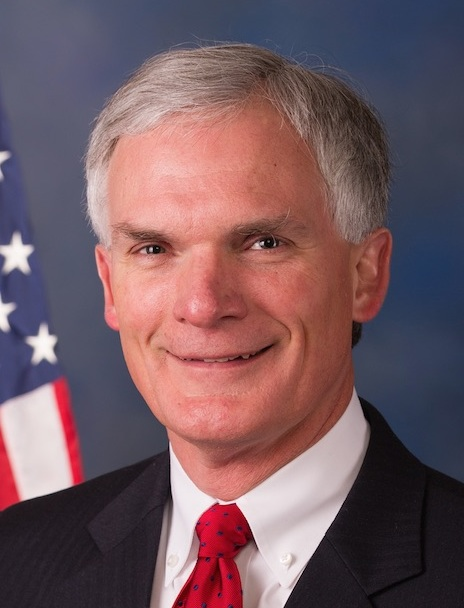

Nominee	Bob Latta	Nick Rubando
Party	Republican	Democratic
Popular vote	257,019	120,962
Percentage	68.0%	32.0%
- Latta: 50–60% 60–70% 70–80% 80–90% >90% Rubando: 50–60% 60–70% 70–80% No votes
U.S. Representative before election
Bob Latta
Republican
Elected U.S. Representative
Bob Latta
Republican

The 5th district encompasses Northwestern Ohio, taking in Findlay, Defiance, and Bowling Green. The incumbent was Republican Bob Latta, who was re-elected with 62.3% of the vote in 2018.

=== Republican primary ===
==== Candidates ====
===== Nominee =====
- Bob Latta, incumbent U.S. representative

==== Primary results ====
Republican primary results
Party	Candidate	Votes	%
Republican	Bob Latta (incumbent)	57,537	100.0
Total votes		57,537	100.0

=== Democratic primary ===
==== Candidates ====
===== Nominee =====
- Nick Rubando, cultural programmer

===== Eliminated in primary =====
- M. Xavier Carrigan, truck driver
- Gene Redinger

===== Endorsements =====
M. Xavier Carrigan

Organizations

- DUH! Demand Universal Healthcare
- Our Revolution - Northwest Ohio
- Rose Caucus
Nick Rubando

Labor unions

- Communications Workers of America #4319
- Operative Plasterers' and Cement Masons' International Association #886
- United Food and Commercial Workers

Organizations

- American Progressives in STEM
- Brand New Congress
- Lucas County Democratic Party
- Ohio Students for Gun Legislation
- Sierra Club
- Wood County Democratic Party

Individuals

- Donald Traxler, former mayor of Ada

==== Primary results ====
Democratic primary results
Party	Candidate	Votes	%
Democratic	Nick Rubando	17,902	51.4
Democratic	Gene Redinger	9,079	26.1
Democratic	M. Xavier Carrigan	7,843	22.5
Total votes		34,824	100.0

=== General election ===
==== Predictions ====
Source	Ranking	As of
The Cook Political Report	Safe R	July 2, 2020
Inside Elections	Safe R	June 2, 2020
Sabato's Crystal Ball	Safe R	July 2, 2020
Politico	Safe R	April 19, 2020
Daily Kos	Safe R	June 3, 2020
RCP	Safe R	June 9, 2020
Niskanen	Safe R	June 7, 2020

==== Results ====
Ohio's 5th congressional district election, 2020
Party	Candidate	Votes	%
Republican	Bob Latta (incumbent)	257,019	68.0
Democratic	Nick Rubando	120,962	32.0
Total votes		377,981	100.0
Republican hold			

== District 6 ==
2020 Ohio's 6th congressional district election
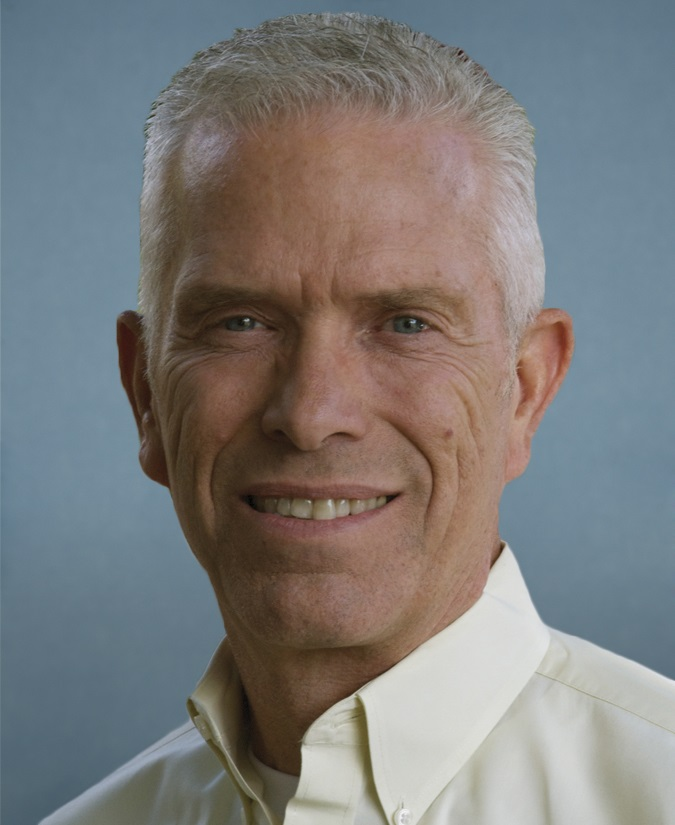

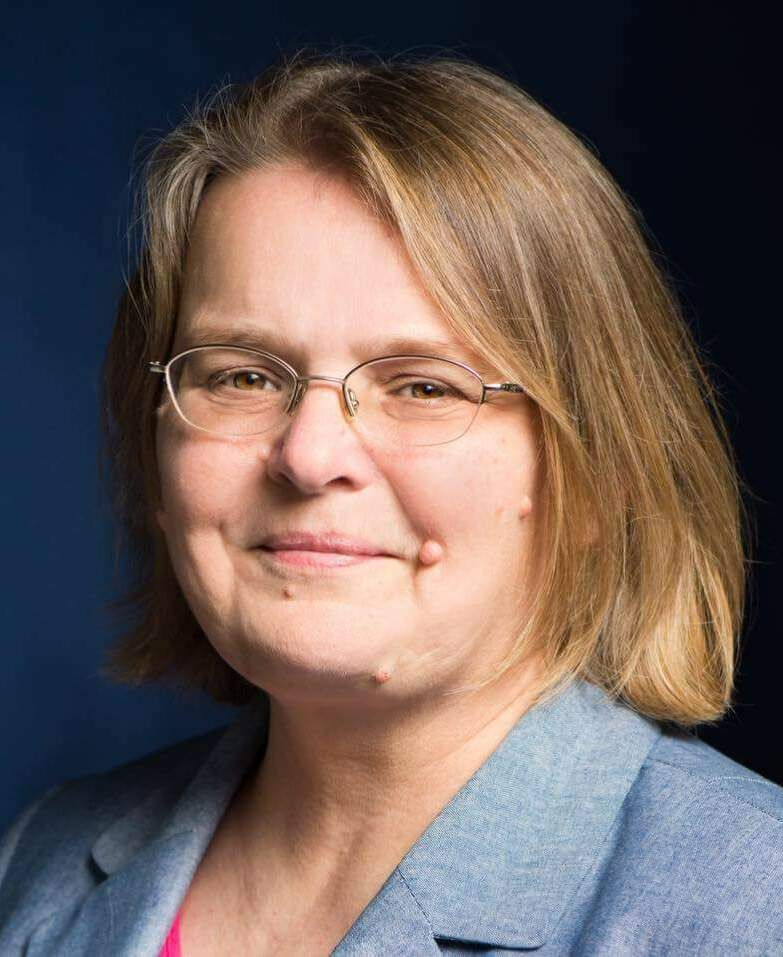
Nominee	Bill Johnson	Shawna Roberts
Party	Republican	Democratic
Popular vote	249,130	85,661
Percentage	74.4%	25.6%
- Johnson: 50–60% 60–70% 70–80% 80–90% Roberts: 50–60% 60–70%
U.S. Representative before election
Bill Johnson
Republican
Elected U.S. Representative
Bill Johnson
Republican

The 6th district encompasses Appalachian Ohio, including Steubenville, Marietta, and Ironton. The incumbent was Republican Bill Johnson, who was re-elected with 69.2% of the vote in 2018.

=== Republican primary ===
==== Candidates ====
===== Nominee =====
- Bill Johnson, incumbent U.S. representative

===== Eliminated in primary =====
- Kenneth Morgan

==== Primary results ====
Republican primary results
Party	Candidate	Votes	%
Republican	Bill Johnson (incumbent)	57,790	86.9
Republican	Kenneth Morgan	8,721	13.1
Total votes		66,551	100.0

=== Democratic primary ===
==== Candidates ====
===== Nominee =====
- Shawna Roberts, former small business owner and nominee for this seat in 2018

==== Primary results ====
Democratic primary results
Party	Candidate	Votes	%
Democratic	Shawna Roberts	30,628	100.0
Total votes		30,628	100.0

=== General election ===
==== Predictions ====
Source	Ranking	As of
The Cook Political Report	Safe R	July 2, 2020
Inside Elections	Safe R	June 2, 2020
Sabato's Crystal Ball	Safe R	July 2, 2020
Politico	Safe R	April 19, 2020
Daily Kos	Safe R	June 3, 2020
RCP	Safe R	June 9, 2020
Niskanen	Safe R	June 7, 2020

==== Results ====
Ohio's 6th congressional district election, 2020
Party	Candidate	Votes	%
Republican	Bill Johnson (incumbent)	249,130	74.4
Democratic	Shawna Roberts	85,661	25.6
Total votes		334,791	100.0
Republican hold			

== District 7 ==
2020 Ohio's 7th congressional district election
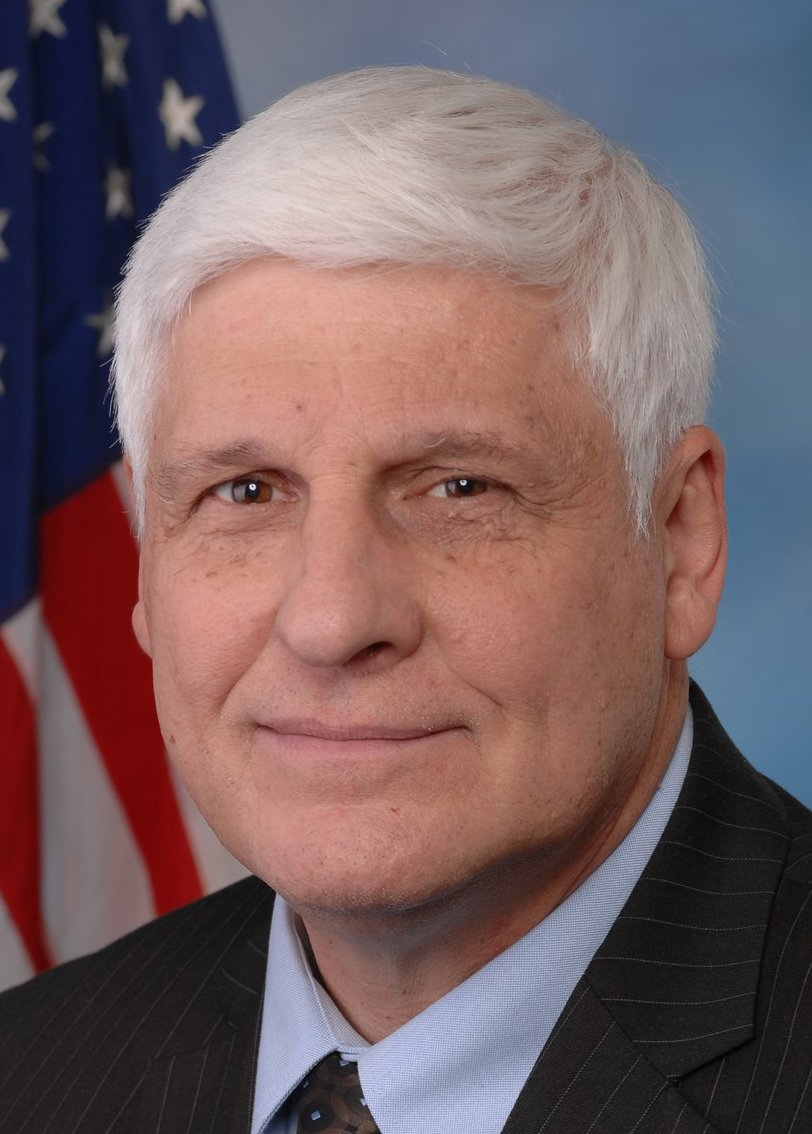

Nominee	Bob Gibbs	Quentin Potter
Party	Republican	Democratic
Popular vote	236,607	102,271
Percentage	67.5%	29.2%
- Gibbs: 40–50% 50–60% 60–70% 70–80% 80–90% >90% Potter: 40–50% 50–60% 60–70% 70–80% 80–90% >90% No votes
U.S. Representative before election
Bob Gibbs
Republican
Elected U.S. Representative
Bob Gibbs
Republican

The 7th district is based in northeastern Ohio, and includes the city of Canton. The incumbent was Republican Bob Gibbs, who was re-elected with 58.7% of the vote in 2018.

=== Republican primary ===
==== Candidates ====
===== Nominee =====
- Bob Gibbs, incumbent U.S. representative

==== Primary results ====
Republican primary results
Party	Candidate	Votes	%
Republican	Bob Gibbs (incumbent)	55,009	100.0
Total votes		55,009	100.0

=== Democratic primary ===
==== Candidates ====
===== Nominee =====
- Quentin Potter (write-in)

===== Disqualified =====
- Patrick Pikus, business manager and candidate for Ohio's 7th congressional district in 2018

==== Results ====
Democratic primary results
Party	Candidate	Votes	%
Democratic	Quentin Potter (write-in)	2,356	100.0
Total votes		2,356	100.0

=== Third parties ===
==== Libertarian Party ====
===== Candidates =====
- Brandon Lape (Libertarian), computer technician

===== Results =====
Libertarian primary results
Party	Candidate	Votes	%
Libertarian	Brandon Lape	261	100.0
Total votes		261	100.0

=== General election ===
==== Predictions ====
Source	Ranking	As of
The Cook Political Report	Safe R	July 2, 2020
Inside Elections	Safe R	June 2, 2020
Sabato's Crystal Ball	Safe R	July 2, 2020
Politico	Safe R	April 19, 2020
Daily Kos	Safe R	June 3, 2020
RCP	Safe R	June 9, 2020
Niskanen	Safe R	June 7, 2020

==== Results ====
Ohio's 7th congressional district election, 2020
Party	Candidate	Votes	%
Republican	Bob Gibbs (incumbent)	236,607	67.5
Democratic	Quentin Potter	102,271	29.2
Libertarian	Brandon Lape	11,671	3.3
Total votes		350,549	100.0
Republican hold			

== District 8 ==
2020 Ohio's 8th congressional district election
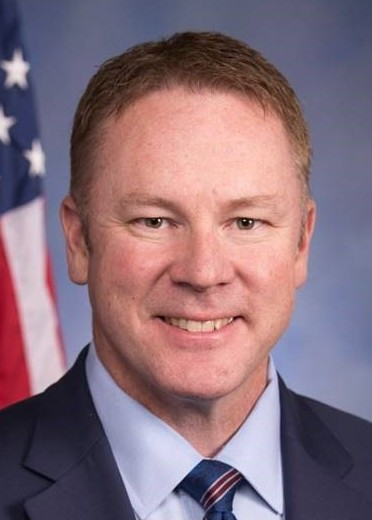

Nominee	Warren Davidson	Vanessa Enoch
Party	Republican	Democratic
Popular vote	246,277	110,766
Percentage	69.0%	31.0%
- Davidson: 50–60% 60–70% 70–80% 80–90% >90% Enoch: 50–60% 60–70% 70–80% 80–90% Tie: 50% No votes
U.S. Representative before election
Warren Davidson
Republican
Elected U.S. Representative
Warren Davidson
Republican

The 8th district takes in the northern suburbs of Cincinnati, including Butler County, as well as taking in Springfield. The incumbent was Republican Warren Davidson, who was re-elected with 66.6% of the vote in 2018.

=== Republican primary ===
==== Candidates ====
===== Nominee =====
- Warren Davidson, incumbent U.S. representative

===== Eliminated in primary =====
- Edward Meer, founder of Blue Butler

==== Primary results ====
Republican primary results
Party	Candidate	Votes	%
Republican	Warren Davidson (incumbent)	53,542	91.3
Republican	Edward Meer	5,125	8.7
Total votes		56,574	100.0

=== Democratic primary ===
==== Candidates ====
===== Nominee =====
- Vanessa Enoch, management consultant and nominee for this seat in 2018

===== Eliminated in primary =====
- Matthew Guyette, paralegal and candidate for this seat in 2014 and 2018

==== Primary results ====
Democratic primary results
Party	Candidate	Votes	%
Democratic	Vanessa Enoch	24,297	79.5
Democratic	Matthew J. Guyette	6,269	20.5
Total votes		30,566	100.0

=== General election ===
==== Endorsements ====
Vanessa Enoch (D)

Organizations

- National Women's Political Caucus

==== Predictions ====
Source	Ranking	As of
The Cook Political Report	Safe R	July 2, 2020
Inside Elections	Safe R	June 2, 2020
Sabato's Crystal Ball	Safe R	July 2, 2020
Politico	Safe R	April 19, 2020
Daily Kos	Safe R	June 3, 2020
RCP	Safe R	June 9, 2020
Niskanen	Safe R	June 7, 2020

==== Results ====
Ohio's 8th congressional district election, 2020
Party	Candidate	Votes	%
Republican	Warren Davidson (incumbent)	246,277	69.0
Democratic	Vanessa Enoch	110,766	31.0
Write-in		114	0.0
Total votes		357,157	100.0
Republican hold			

== District 9 ==
2020 Ohio's 9th congressional district election
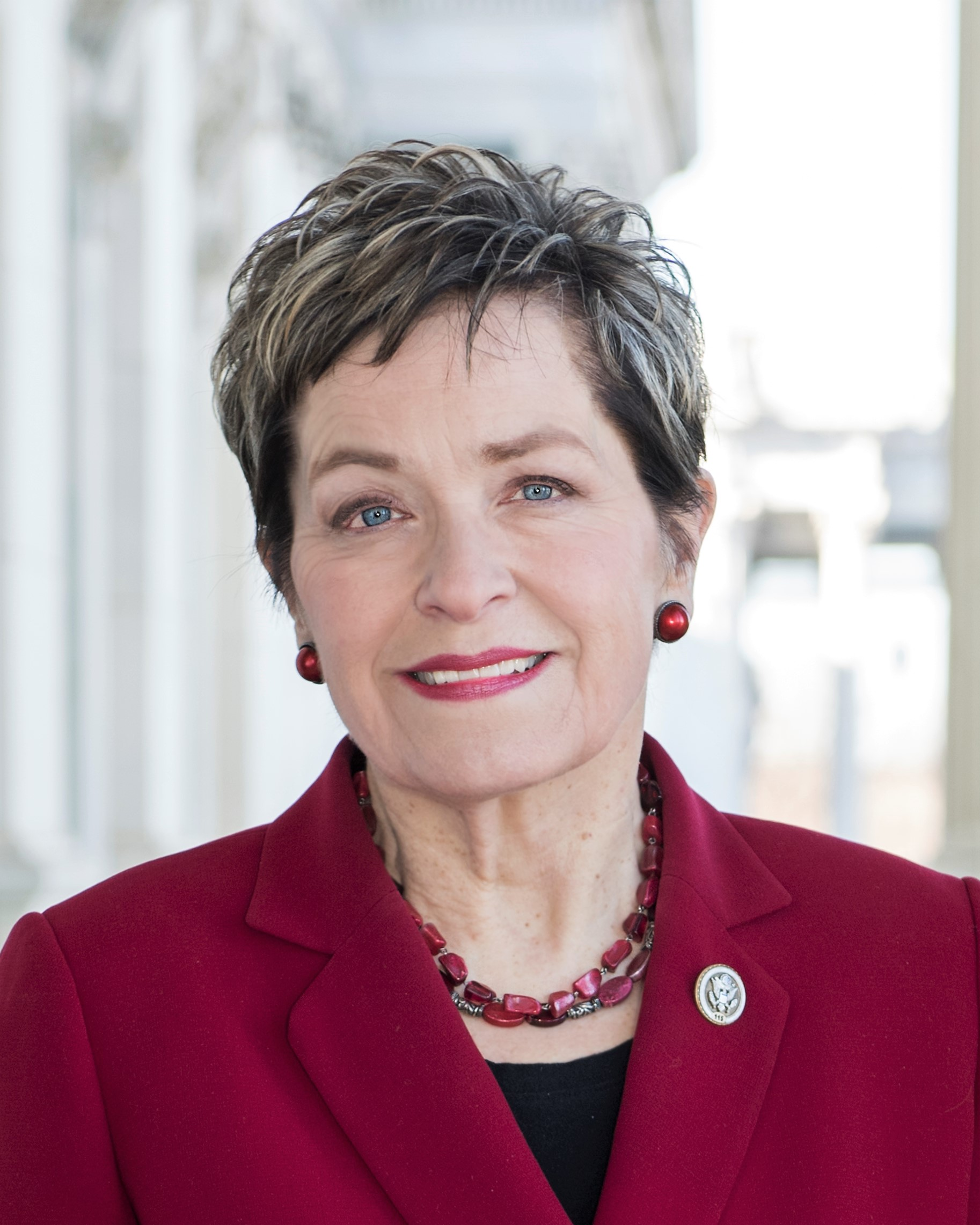

Nominee	Marcy Kaptur	Rob Weber
Party	Democratic	Republican
Popular vote	190,328	111,385
Percentage	63.1%	36.9%
- Kaptur: 50–60% 60–70% 70–80% 80–90% ≥90% Weber: 50–60% 60–70%
U.S. Representative before election
Marcy Kaptur
Democratic
Elected U.S. Representative
Marcy Kaptur
Democratic

The 9th district spans the coast of Lake Erie from Toledo to the west side of Cleveland, taking in Port Clinton, Sandusky, Lorain, Lakewood, Brook Park, and Brooklyn. The incumbent was Democrat Marcy Kaptur, who was re-elected with 67.8% of the vote in 2018.

=== Democratic primary ===
==== Candidates ====
===== Nominee =====
- Marcy Kaptur, incumbent U.S. Representative

===== Eliminated in primary =====
- Peter Rosewicz, loan officer

==== Primary results ====
Democratic primary results
Party	Candidate	Votes	%
Democratic	Marcy Kaptur (incumbent)	52,433	90.7
Democratic	Peter Rosewicz	5,370	9.3
Total votes		57,803	100.0

=== Republican primary ===
==== Candidates ====
===== Nominee =====
- Rob Weber

===== Eliminated in primary =====
- Charles Barrett
- Tim Connors
- Timothy Corrigan

==== Primary results ====
Republican primary results
Party	Candidate	Votes	%
Republican	Rob Weber	10,863	59.8
Republican	Timothy P. Corrigan	3,873	21.3
Republican	Tim Connors	2,064	11.4
Republican	Charles W. Barrett	1,376	7.6
Total votes		18,176	100.0

=== General election ===
==== Endorsements ====
Marcy Kaptur (D)

Organizations

- Sierra Club

==== Predictions ====
Source	Ranking	As of
The Cook Political Report	Safe D	July 2, 2020
Inside Elections	Safe D	June 2, 2020
Sabato's Crystal Ball	Safe D	July 2, 2020
Politico	Safe D	April 19, 2020
Daily Kos	Safe D	June 3, 2020
RCP	Safe D	June 9, 2020
Niskanen	Safe D	June 7, 2020

==== Results ====
Ohio's 9th congressional district election, 2020
Party	Candidate	Votes	%
Democratic	Marcy Kaptur (incumbent)	190,328	63.1
Republican	Rob Weber	111,385	36.9
Write-in		39	0.0
Total votes		301,752	100.0
Democratic hold			

== District 10 ==
2020 Ohio's 10th congressional district election
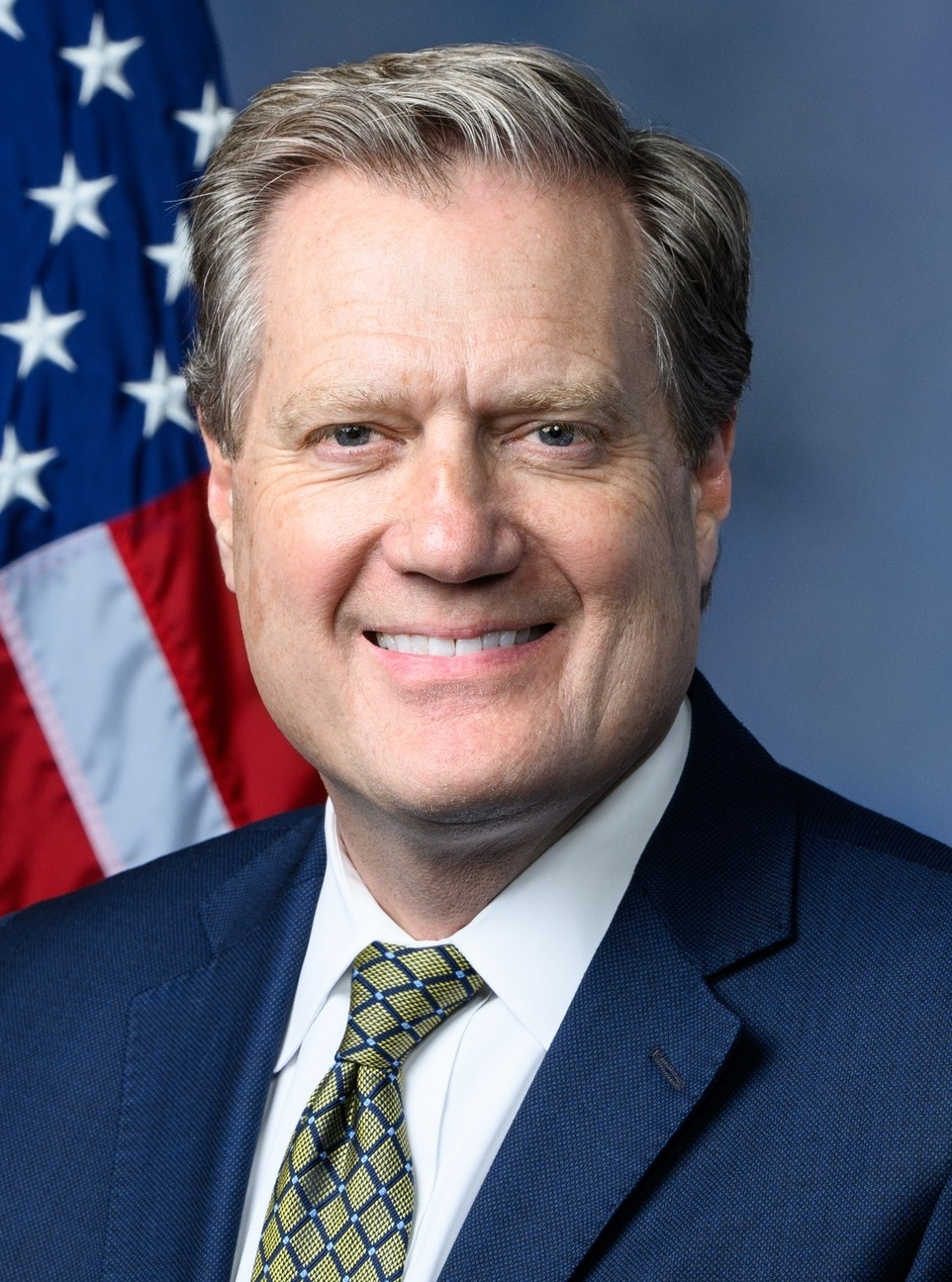

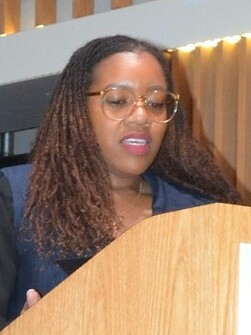
Nominee	Mike Turner	Desiree Tims
Party	Republican	Democratic
Popular vote	212,972	151,976
Percentage	58.4%	41.6%
- Turner: 50–60% 60–70% 70–80% 80–90% Tims: 50–60% 60–70% 70–80% 80–90% >90% No votes
U.S. Representative before election
Mike Turner
Republican
Elected U.S. Representative
Mike Turner
Republican

The 10th district encompasses the Dayton metro area, including Dayton and the surrounding suburbs. The incumbent was Republican Mike Turner, who was re-elected with 55.9% of the vote in 2018.

=== Republican primary ===
==== Candidates ====
===== Nominee =====
- Mike Turner, incumbent U.S. representative

===== Eliminated in primary =====
- John Anderson
- Kathi Flanders, nurse practitioner

==== Primary results ====
Republican primary results
Party	Candidate	Votes	%
Republican	Mike Turner (incumbent)	44,704	86.4
Republican	John Anderson	4,110	7.9
Republican	Kathi Flanders	2,944	5.7
Total votes		51,758	100.0

=== Democratic primary ===
==== Candidates ====
===== Declared =====
- Desiree Tims, attorney and former political aide to U.S. Senators Sherrod Brown and Kirsten Gillibrand

===== Eliminated in primary =====
- Eric Moyer, former NASA research scientist and Alzheimer's researcher

==== Endorsements ====
Eric Moyer

Organizations

- Our Revolution - Ohio
Desiree Tims

Former US Executive Branch officials

- Barack Obama, former president of the United States (2009-2017, former senator from Illinois (2005-2008)

Federal officials

- Kamala Harris, U.S. senator from California; 2020 vice presidential nominee

Organizations

- League of Conservation Voters
- National Women's Political Caucus
- Sierra Club

==== Primary results ====
Democratic primary results
Party	Candidate	Votes	%
Democratic	Desiree Tims	32,388	70.0
Democratic	Eric Moyer	13,846	30.0
Total votes		46,234	100.0

=== General election ===
==== Post-primary endorsements ====
Desiree Tims (D)

Organizations

- EMILY's List

==== Polling ====
Poll source	Date(s) administered	Sample size	Margin of error	Mike Turner (R)	Desiree Tims (D)	Undecided
Garin-Hart-Yang Research (D) (Note: Poll sponsored by Tims' campaign.)	October 15–18, 2020	400 (LV)	± 5%	49%	45%	–
Garin-Hart-Yang Research (D)	September 26–29, 2020	400 (LV)	± 4.4%	49%	42%	–
Garin-Hart-Yang Research (D)	July, 2020	– (V) (Note: Not yet released)	–	50%	36%	–

==== Predictions ====
Source	Ranking	As of
The Cook Political Report	Likely R	July 31, 2020
Inside Elections	Likely R	August 7, 2020
Sabato's Crystal Ball	Likely R	July 23, 2020
Politico	Lean R	October 11, 2020
Daily Kos	Safe R	June 3, 2020
RCP	Safe R	June 9, 2020
Niskanen	Tossup	June 7, 2020

==== Results ====
Ohio's 10th congressional district election, 2020
Party	Candidate	Votes	%
Republican	Mike Turner (incumbent)	212,972	58.4
Democratic	Desiree Tims	151,976	41.6
Total votes		364,948	100.0
Republican hold			

== District 11 ==
2020 Ohio's 11th congressional district election
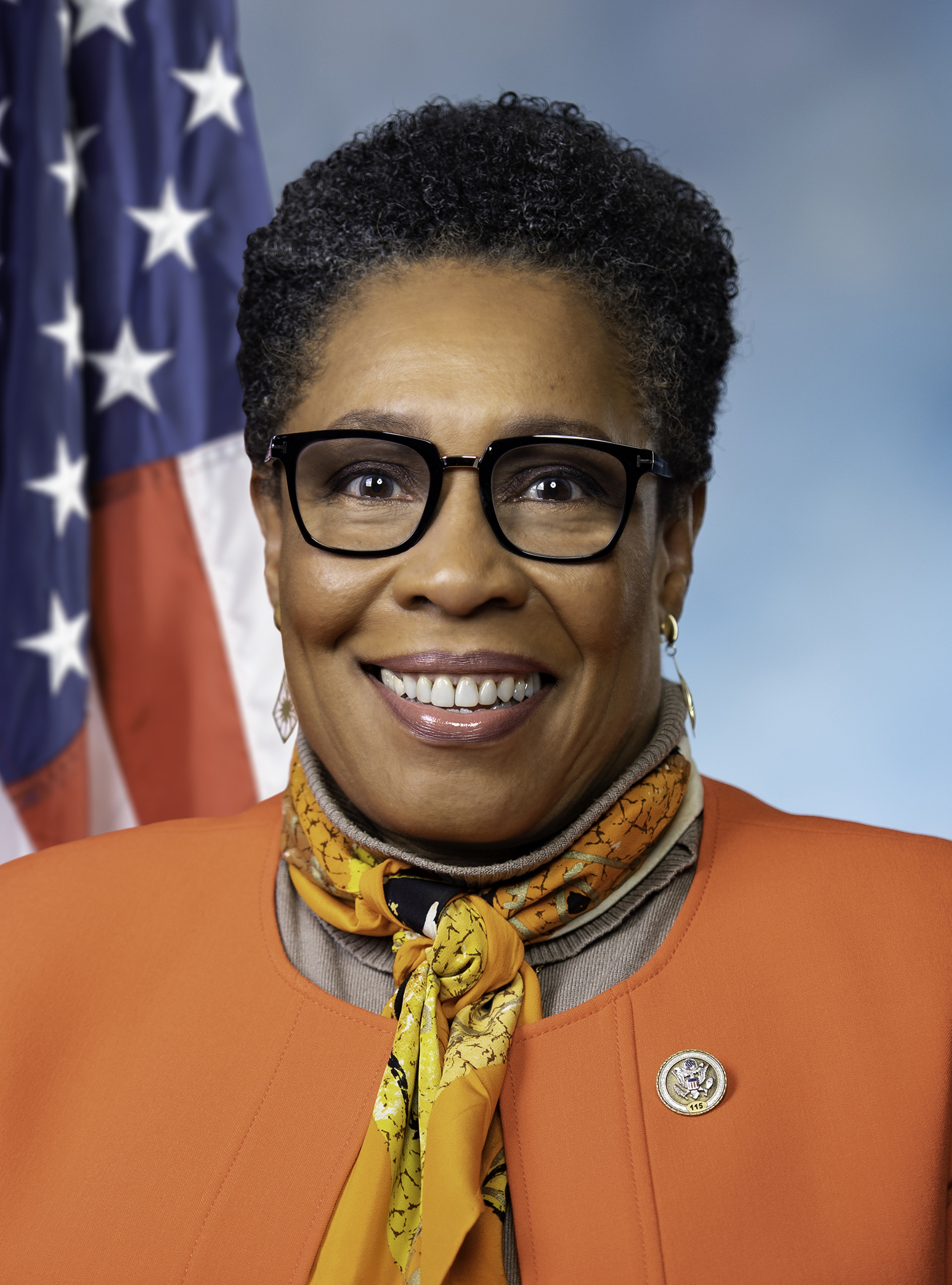

Nominee	Marcia Fudge	Laverne Gore
Party	Democratic	Republican
Popular vote	242,098	60,323
Percentage	80.1%	19.9%
- Fudge: 50–60% 60–70% 70–80% 80–90% >90% Gore: 50–60% 60–70% No votes
U.S. Representative before election
Marcia Fudge
Democratic
Elected U.S. Representative
Marcia Fudge
Democratic

The 11th district takes in eastern Cleveland and its suburbs, including Euclid, Cleveland Heights, and Warrensville Heights, as well as stretching southward into Richfield and parts of Akron. The incumbent was Democrat Marcia Fudge, who was re-elected with 82.2% of the vote in 2018.

=== Democratic primary ===
==== Candidates ====
===== Nominee =====
- Marcia Fudge, incumbent U.S. Representative

===== Eliminated in primary =====
- James Jerome Bell, write-in candidate for this seat in 2018
- Michael Hood, U.S. Navy veteran
- Tariq Shabazz, graduate student

==== Primary results ====
Democratic primary results
Party	Candidate	Votes	%
Democratic	Marcia Fudge (incumbent)	70,379	90.5
Democratic	Tariq Shabazz	2,813	3.6
Democratic	Michael Hood	2,641	3.4
Democratic	James Jerome Bell	1,963	2.5
Total votes		77,796	100.0

=== Republican primary ===
==== Candidates ====
===== Nominee =====
- Laverne Gore, community activist

===== Eliminated in primary =====
- Jonah Schulz, non-profit owner
- Shalira Taylor, marketing consultant and activist

==== Primary results ====
Republican primary results
Party	Candidate	Votes	%
Republican	Laverne Gore	4,589	47.3
Republican	Jonah Schulz	4,027	41.5
Republican	Shalira Taylor	1,083	11.2
Total votes		9,699	100.0

=== General election ===
==== Endorsements ====
Marcia Fudge (D)

Organizations

- Sierra Club

==== Predictions ====
Source	Ranking	As of
The Cook Political Report	Safe D	July 2, 2020
Inside Elections	Safe D	June 2, 2020
Sabato's Crystal Ball	Safe D	July 2, 2020
Politico	Safe D	April 19, 2020
Daily Kos	Safe D	June 3, 2020
RCP	Safe D	June 9, 2020
Niskanen	Safe D	June 7, 2020

==== Results ====
Ohio's 11th congressional district election, 2020
Party	Candidate	Votes	%
Democratic	Marcia Fudge (incumbent)	242,098	80.1
Republican	Laverne Gore	60,323	19.9
Total votes		302,421	100.0
Democratic hold			

== District 12 ==
2020 Ohio's 12th congressional district election
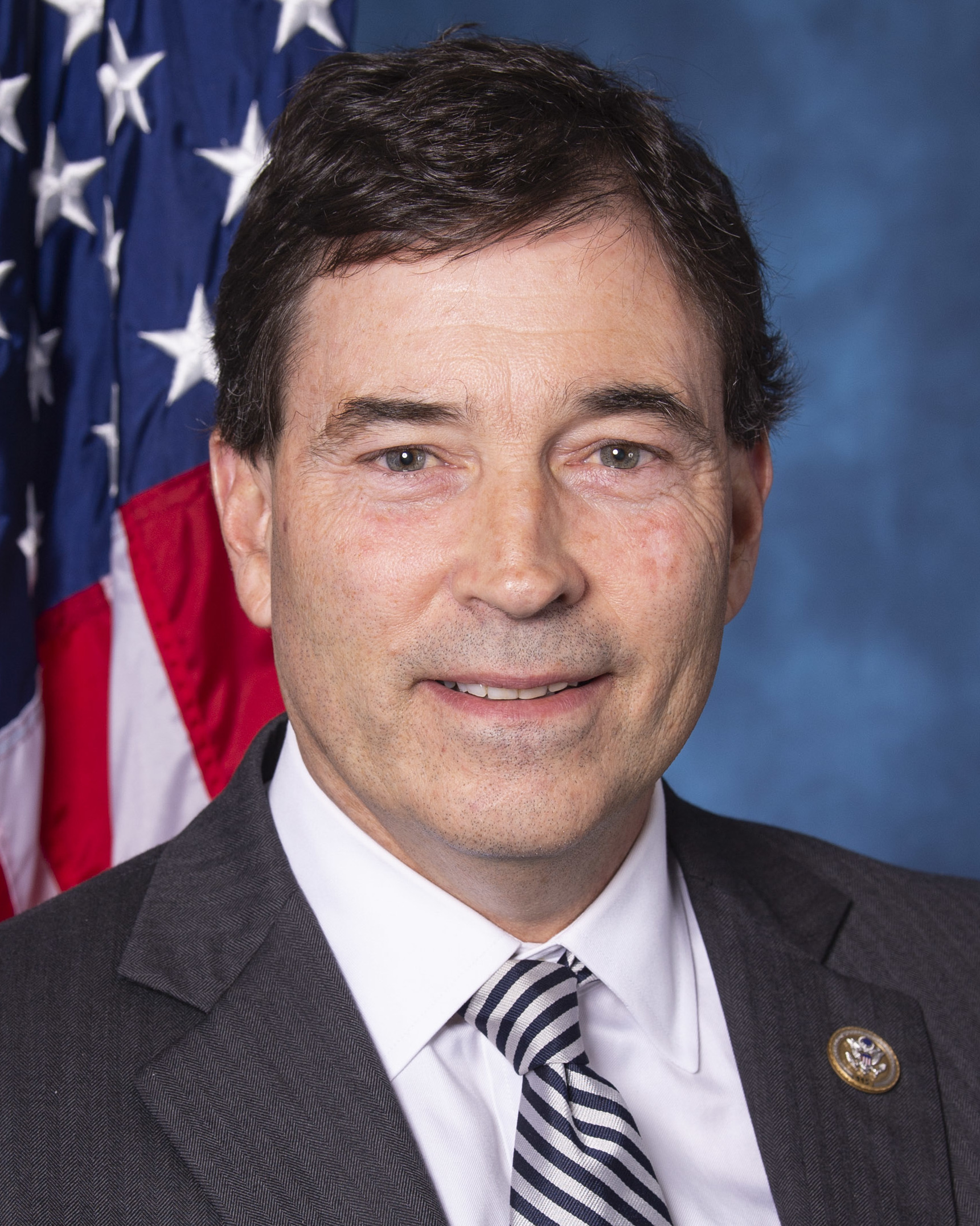

Nominee	Troy Balderson	Alaina Shearer
Party	Republican	Democratic
Popular vote	241,790	182,847
Percentage	55.2%	41.8%
- Balderson: 50–60% 60–70% 70–80% 80–90% ≥90% Shearer: 50–60% 60–70% 70–80% 80–90% ≥90%
U.S. Representative before election
Troy Balderson
Republican
Elected U.S. Representative
Troy Balderson
Republican

The 12th district encompasses the northern Columbus metro area, taking in the northern Columbus suburbs, including Dublin, Westerville, Gahanna, and New Albany, as well as Newark, Mansfield, and Zanesville. The incumbent was Republican Troy Balderson, who was re-elected with 51.4% of the vote in 2018.

=== Republican primary ===
==== Candidates ====
===== Nominee =====
- Troy Balderson, incumbent U.S. representative

===== Eliminated in primary =====
- Tim Day, Ohio National Guard veteran

==== Primary results ====
Republican primary results
Party	Candidate	Votes	%
Republican	Troy Balderson (incumbent)	51,412	83.9
Republican	Tim Day	9,877	16.1
Total votes		61,289	100.0

=== Democratic primary ===
==== Candidates ====
===== Nominee =====
- Alaina Shearer, businesswoman

===== Eliminated in primary =====
- Jenny Bell, nurse practitioner

===== Declined =====
- Danny O'Connor, Franklin County recorder and nominee for this seat in 2018

==== Endorsements ====
Jenny Bell

Organizations

- Our Revolution - Ohio

==== Primary results ====
Democratic primary results
Party	Candidate	Votes	%
Democratic	Alaina Shearer	34,103	58.4
Democratic	Jenny Bell	24,263	41.6
Total votes		58,366	100.0

=== General election ===
==== Endorsements ====
Alaina Shearer (D)

Organizations

- National Women's Political Caucus
- Ohio Students for Gun Legislation
- Population Connection

==== Polling ====
Poll source	Date(s) administered	Sample size	Margin of error	Troy Balderson (R)	Alaina Shearer (D)	Undecided
Public Policy Polling (D) (Note: Poll sponsored by Shearer's campaign.)	October 14–15, 2020	818 (RV)	–	48%	44%	–

==== Predictions ====
Source	Ranking	As of
The Cook Political Report	Likely R	July 16, 2020
Inside Elections	Safe R	June 2, 2020
Sabato's Crystal Ball	Likely R	July 2, 2020
Politico	Lean R	October 11, 2020
Daily Kos	Likely R	October 26, 2020
RCP	Lean R	June 9, 2020
Niskanen	Lean R	June 7, 2020

==== Results ====
Ohio's 12th congressional district election, 2020
Party	Candidate	Votes	%
Republican	Troy Balderson (incumbent)	241,790	55.2
Democratic	Alaina Shearer	182,847	41.8
Libertarian	John S. Stewart	13,035	3.0
Total votes		437,672	100.0
Republican hold			

== District 13 ==
2020 Ohio's 13th congressional district election
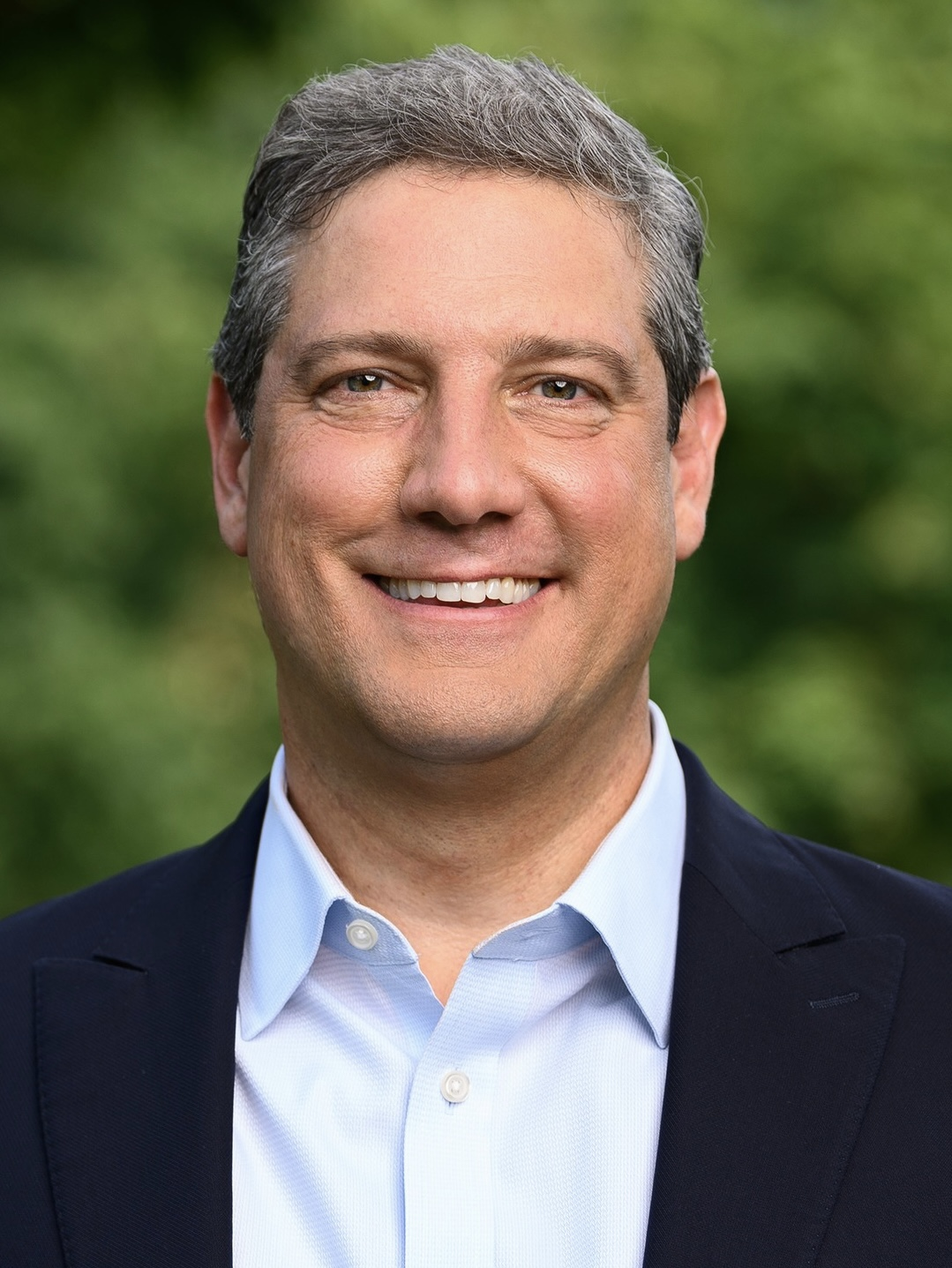

Nominee	Tim Ryan	Christina Hagan
Party	Democratic	Republican
Popular vote	173,631	148,648
Percentage	52.5%	44.9%
- Ryan: 50–60% 60–70% 70–80% 80–90% ≥90% Hagan: 50–60% 60–70% 60–70%
U.S. Representative before election
Tim Ryan
Democratic
Elected U.S. Representative
Tim Ryan
Democratic

The 13th district covers the Mahoning Valley in northeastern Ohio, including Youngstown and eastern parts of Akron. The incumbent was Democrat Tim Ryan, who was re-elected with 61.0% of the vote in 2018, and ran for president in 2020, though he dropped out on October 24, 2019. He was seeking re-election.

=== Democratic primary ===
==== Candidates ====
===== Nominee =====
- Tim Ryan, incumbent U.S. representative

==== Primary results ====
Democratic primary results
Party	Candidate	Votes	%
Democratic	Tim Ryan (incumbent)	61,813	100.0
Total votes		61,813	100.0

=== Republican primary ===
==== Candidates ====
===== Nominee =====
- Christina Hagan, former state representative and candidate for 16th district in 2018

===== Eliminated in primary =====
- Duane Hennen, businessman and former pastor
- Lou Lyras, businessman
- Richard Morckel
- Jason Mormando
- Robert Santos
- Donald Truex

===== Declined =====
- Mary Taylor, former lieutenant governor of Ohio

==== Primary results ====
Republican primary results
Party	Candidate	Votes	%
Republican	Christina Hagan	19,327	65.8
Republican	Lou Lyras	3,483	11.9
Republican	Robert Santos	3,358	11.4
Republican	Donald Truex	1,034	3.5
Republican	Duane Hennen	1,032	3.5
Republican	Richard Morckel	763	2.6
Republican	Jason Mormado	389	1.3
Total votes		29,386	100.0

=== Third parties ===
==== Libertarian Party ====
===== Candidates =====
- Michael Fricke

===== Primary results =====
Libertarian primary results
Party	Candidate	Votes	%
Libertarian	Michael Fricke	131	100.0
Total votes		131	100.0

=== General election ===
==== Endorsements ====
Tim Ryan (D)

Organizations

- Humanity Forward
- NARAL Pro-Choice America
- Planned Parenthood Action Fund
- Sierra Club

Individuals

- Andrew Yang, former 2020 Democratic presidential candidate
Christina Hagan (R)

Federal officials

- Donald Trump, President of the United States

==== Predictions ====
Source	Ranking	As of
The Cook Political Report	Safe D	July 2, 2020
Inside Elections	Safe D	June 2, 2020
Sabato's Crystal Ball	Safe D	July 2, 2020
Politico	Likely D	April 19, 2020
Daily Kos	Safe D	June 3, 2020
RCP	Safe D	June 9, 2020
Niskanen	Safe D	June 7, 2020

==== Results ====
Ohio's 13th congressional district election, 2020
Party	Candidate	Votes	%
Democratic	Tim Ryan (incumbent)	173,631	52.5
Republican	Christina Hagan	148,648	44.9
Libertarian	Michael Fricke	8,522	2.6
Total votes		330,801	100.0
Democratic hold			

== District 14 ==
2020 Ohio's 14th congressional district election
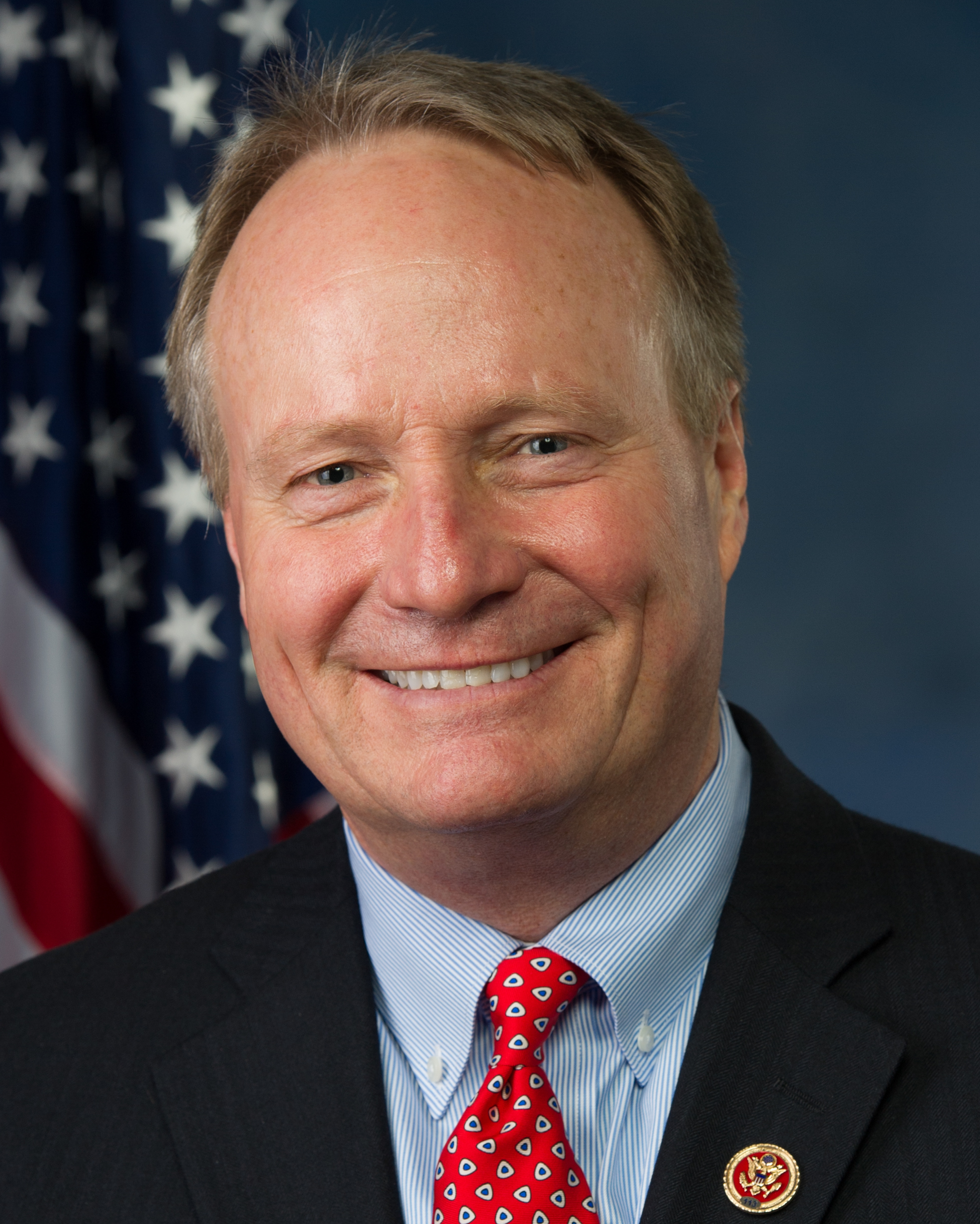

Nominee	David Joyce	Hillary O'Connor Mueri
Party	Republican	Democratic
Popular vote	238,864	158,586
Percentage	60.1%	39.9%
- Joyce: 50–60% 60–70% 70–80% 80–90% Mueri: 50–60% 60–70% 70–80% 80–90% Tie: 50% No votes
U.S. Representative before election
David Joyce
Republican
Elected U.S. Representative
David Joyce
Republican

The 14th district is located in Northeast Ohio, taking in the eastern suburbs and exurbs of Cleveland, including Mayfield Heights, Solon, and Independence, as well as Ashtabula, Lake, and Geauga counties, northern Portage County, and northeastern Summit County. The incumbent was Republican David Joyce, who was re-elected with 55.2% of the vote in 2018.

=== Republican primary ===
==== Candidates ====
===== Nominee =====
- David Joyce, incumbent U.S. representative

===== Eliminated in primary =====
- Mark Pitrone, write-in candidate for this seat in 2018

==== Primary results ====
Republican primary results
Party	Candidate	Votes	%
Republican	David Joyce (incumbent)	43,970	83.1
Republican	Mark Pitrone	8,932	16.9
Total votes		52,902	100.0

=== Democratic primary ===
==== Candidates ====
===== Nominee =====
- Hillary O'Connor Mueri, attorney and U.S. Navy veteran

==== Primary results ====
Democratic primary results
Party	Candidate	Votes	%
Democratic	Hillary O'Connor Mueri	48,107	100.0
Total votes		48,107	100.0

=== General election ===
==== Endorsements ====
Hillary O'Connor Mueri (D)

Organizations

- EMILY's List

==== Predictions ====
Source	Ranking	As of
The Cook Political Report	Safe R	July 2, 2020
Inside Elections	Safe R	June 2, 2020
Sabato's Crystal Ball	Safe R	July 2, 2020
Politico	Likely R	April 19, 2020
Daily Kos	Safe R	June 3, 2020
RCP	Safe R	June 9, 2020
Niskanen	Safe R	June 7, 2020

==== Results ====
Ohio's 14th congressional district election, 2020
Party	Candidate	Votes	%
Republican	David Joyce (incumbent)	238,864	60.1
Democratic	Hillary "Toro" O'Connor Mueri	158,586	39.9
Total votes		397,450	100.0
Republican hold			

== District 15 ==
2020 Ohio's 15th congressional district election
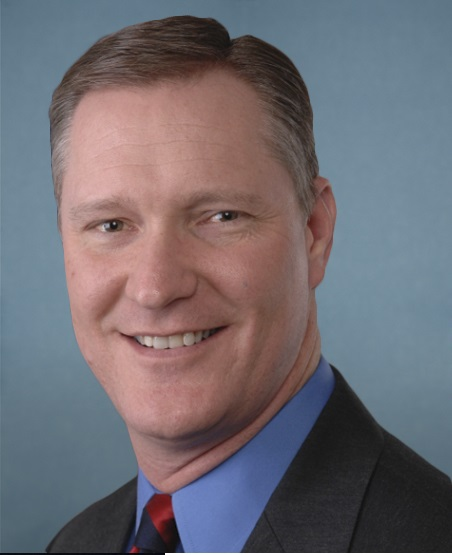

Nominee	Steve Stivers	Joel Newby
Party	Republican	Democratic
Popular vote	243,103	140,183
Percentage	63.4%	36.6%
- Stivers: 50–60% 60–70% 70–80% 80–90% >90% Newby: 50–60% 60–70% 70–80% 80–90% >90% Tie: 50% No data
U.S. Representative before election
Steve Stivers
Republican
Elected U.S. Representative
Steve Stivers
Republican

The 15th district encompasses the southern Columbus metro area, taking in the western and eastern suburbs of Columbus, including Upper Arlington, Hilliard, and Grove City, as well as Athens. The incumbent was Republican Steve Stivers, who was re-elected with 58.3% of the vote in 2018.

=== Republican primary ===
==== Candidates ====
===== Nominee =====
- Steve Stivers, incumbent U.S. Representative

===== Eliminated in primary =====
- Shelby Hunt

==== Primary results ====
Republican primary results
Party	Candidate	Votes	%
Republican	Steve Stivers (incumbent)	41,749	88.1
Republican	Shelby Hunt	5,627	11.9
Total votes		47,376	100.0

=== Democratic primary ===
==== Candidates ====
===== Nominee =====
- Joel Newby, attorney

===== Eliminated in primary =====
- Daniel Kilgore

==== Primary results ====
Democratic primary results
Party	Candidate	Votes	%
Democratic	Joel Newby	28,503	65.6
Democratic	Daniel Kilgore	14,916	34.4
Total votes		43,419	100.0

=== Third parties ===
Candidates

==== Declared ====
- Shane Hoffman (write-in, American Solidarity Party)

=== General election ===
==== Endorsements ====
Steve Stivers (R)

Organizations

- Combat Veterans for Congress

==== Predictions ====
Source	Ranking	As of
The Cook Political Report	Safe R	July 2, 2020
Inside Elections	Safe R	June 2, 2020
Sabato's Crystal Ball	Safe R	July 2, 2020
Politico	Safe R	April 19, 2020
Daily Kos	Safe R	June 3, 2020
RCP	Safe R	June 9, 2020
Niskanen	Safe R	June 7, 2020

==== Results ====
Ohio's 15th congressional district election, 2020
Party	Candidate	Votes	%
Republican	Steve Stivers (incumbent)	243,103	63.4
Democratic	Joel Newby	140,183	36.6
Write-in		75	0.0
Total votes		383,361	100.0
Republican hold			

== District 16 ==
2020 Ohio's 16th congressional district election
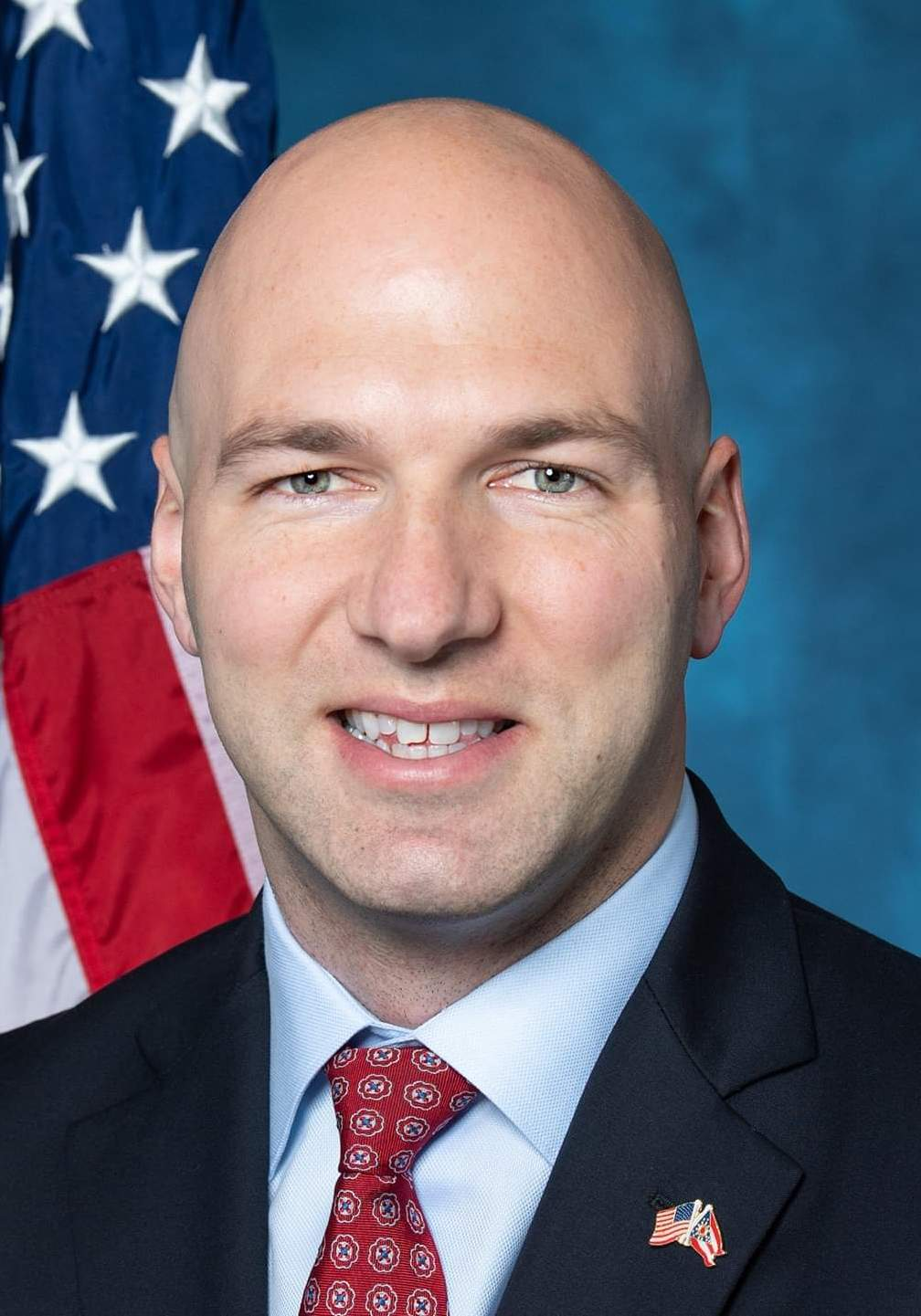

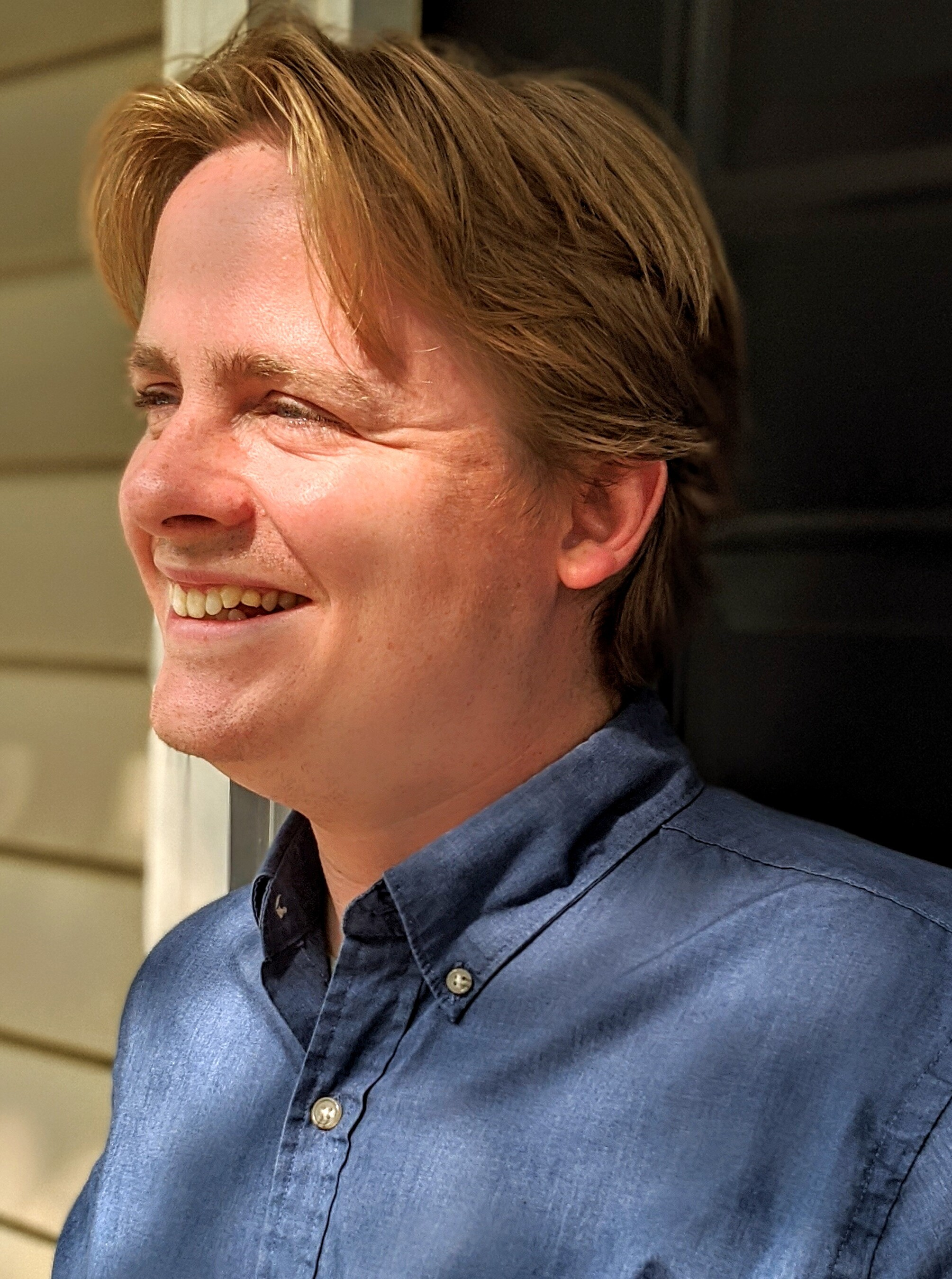
Nominee	Anthony Gonzalez	Aaron Paul Godfrey
Party	Republican	Democratic
Popular vote	247,335	144,071
Percentage	63.2%	36.8%
- Gonzalez: 50–60% 60–70% 70–80% 80–90% >90% Godfrey: 50–60% 60–70% >90% Tie: 50% No votes
U.S. Representative before election
Anthony Gonzalez
Republican
Elected U.S. Representative
Anthony Gonzalez
Republican

The 16th district takes in the western suburbs of Cleveland, including Westlake, Parma, and Strongsville, as well as Medina, Norton, and North Canton. The incumbent was Republican Anthony Gonzalez, who was first elected with 56.7% of the vote in 2018.

=== Republican primary ===
==== Candidates ====
===== Nominee =====
- Anthony Gonzalez, incumbent U.S. representative

==== Primary results ====
Republican primary results
Party	Candidate	Votes	%
Republican	Anthony Gonzalez (incumbent)	43,026	100.0
Total votes		43,026	100.0

=== Democratic primary ===
==== Candidates ====
===== Nominee =====
- Aaron Paul Godfrey, physicist and candidate for this seat in 2018

===== Eliminated in primary =====
- Ronald Karpus III

==== Primary results ====
Democratic primary results
Party	Candidate	Votes	%
Democratic	Aaron Paul Godfrey	32,024	67.7
Democratic	Ronald Karpus III	15,244	32.3
Total votes		47,278	100.0

=== General election ===
==== Predictions ====
Source	Ranking	As of
The Cook Political Report	Safe R	July 2, 2020
Inside Elections	Safe R	June 2, 2020
Sabato's Crystal Ball	Safe R	July 2, 2020
Politico	Safe R	April 19, 2020
Daily Kos	Safe R	June 3, 2020
RCP	Safe R	June 9, 2020
Niskanen	Safe R	June 7, 2020

==== Results ====
Ohio's 16th congressional district election, 2020
Party	Candidate	Votes	%
Republican	Anthony Gonzalez (incumbent)	247,335	63.2
Democratic	Aaron Paul Godfrey	144,071	36.8
Total votes		391,406	100.0
Republican hold			

== See also ==
- 2020 Ohio elections

== Notes ==
Partisan clients
