= 2005 Cincinnati mayoral election =

- November 8, 2005
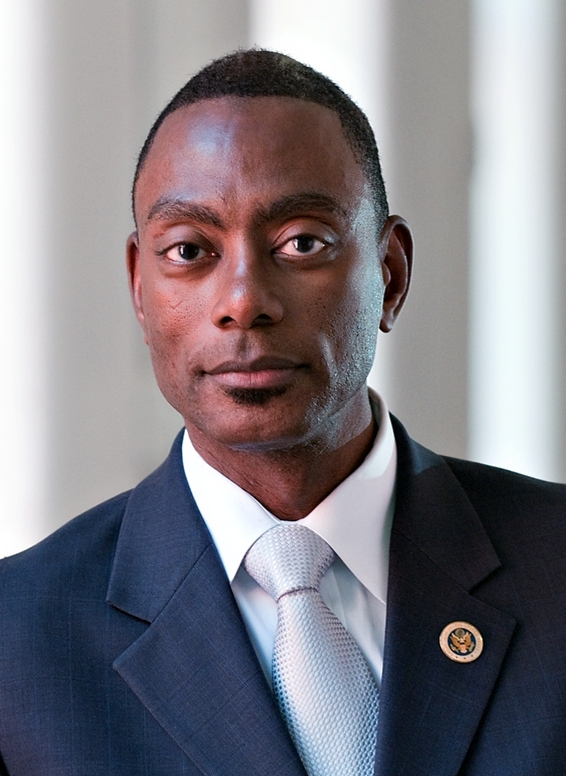

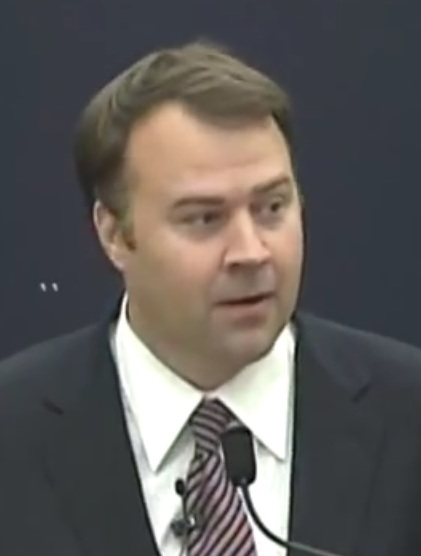
Candidate	Mark Mallory	David A. Pepper
Party	Nonpartisan	Nonpartisan
Popular vote	37,206	34,268
Percentage	52.06%	47.94%
Mayor before election
Charlie Luken
Democratic
Elected mayor
Mark Mallory
Democratic

The 2005 Cincinnati mayoral election took place on November 8, 2005, to elect the Mayor of Cincinnati, Ohio. The election was officially nonpartisan, with the top two candidates from the September 13 primary advancing to the general election, regardless of party.

While the election was nonpartisan, both Mallory and Pepper were known Democrats. Also a known Democrat was Alicia Reece, who was eliminated in the primary. Sylvan Grisco and Charlie Winburn, who were both eliminated in the primary, were known Republicans

== Primary election ==
Primary election results
Party	Candidate	Votes	%
Nonpartisan	David Pepper	13,493	31.04
Nonpartisan	Mark Mallory	13,347	30.70
Nonpartisan	Charlie Winburn	9,098	20.93
Nonpartisan	Alicia Reece	6,552	15.07
Nonpartisan	Justin Jeffre	730	1.68
Nonpartisan	Sylvan Grisco	131	0.30
Nonpartisan	Sandra Queen Noble	119	0.27
Total votes		43,470	100.00

== General election ==
Cincinnati mayoral election, 2005
Party	Candidate	Votes	%
Nonpartisan	Mark Mallory	37,206	52.06
Nonpartisan	David Pepper	34,268	47.94
Total votes		71,474	100.00
