= William L. Mallory Sr. =

American politician

William Mallory Sr.
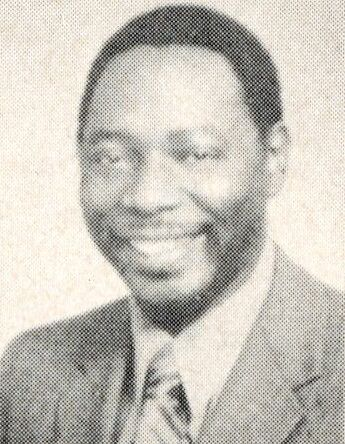

Member of the Ohio House of Representatives from the 31st district
- In office January 3, 1967 – December 31, 1994
- Preceded by: None (First)
- Succeeded by: Mark L. Mallory

Personal details
- Born: October 4, 1931 Cincinnati, Ohio, U.S.
- Died: December 10, 2013 (aged 82) Cincinnati, Ohio, U.S.
- Party: Democratic
- Children: 6 including Mark and Dale

William Leslie Mallory Sr. (October 4, 1931 – December 10, 2013) was an American politician who was elected to the Ohio House of Representatives in 1966 and served for 28 years in the Ohio legislature. In 1974 he won election as Majority Floor Leader, the first African American to serve in that role. When he retired in 1994, he was the longest serving majority leader in the history of Ohio.

William Mallory was born in 1931 in Cincinnati, Ohio. He attended Bloom Junior High School and East Vocational High School, before graduating with Honors from Central State University with a bachelor's in education. He taught at Cincinnati Public Schools, and was an adjunct professor of Political Science and African American Studies at the University of Cincinnati.

Mallory married his wife Fannie in 1955. They had six children, all of whom have pursued careers in politics and public service. Mark Mallory is the former mayor of Cincinnati, Dale Mallory is a former member of the Ohio House of Representatives, William Mallory Jr. and Dwane Mallory both serve as judges in the Hamilton County Municipal Court, and Joe Mallory is the President of the Cincinnati NAACP and former Vice Mayor of Forest Park.

Mallory died at a hospice in Cincinnati on December 10, 2013.
