= Eric Kearney =

American politician

Ohio Senate Minority Leader
- In office January 7, 2013 – December 31, 2014
- Preceded by: Capri Cafaro
- Succeeded by: Joe Schiavoni

Member of the Ohio Senate from the 9th district
- In office December 6, 2005 – December 31, 2014
- Preceded by: Mark Mallory
- Succeeded by: Cecil Thomas

Personal details
- Born: October 27, 1963 (age 62) Cincinnati, Ohio
- Party: Democratic
- Spouse: Jan-Michele
- Children: 2
- Education: Dartmouth College (B.A.); University of Cincinnati (J.D.)
- Profession: Communications, Attorney

Eric H. Kearney (born 1963) is an American Democratic politician who served as the state senator for the 9th District in the Ohio Senate.

== Life and career ==
In 1981, Kearney graduated from St. Xavier High School in Cincinnati. He later received his Juris Doctor from the University of Cincinnati Law School, and his Bachelor of Arts in English from Dartmouth College. Kearney cofounded Sesh Communications, one of the largest African American–owned publishing companies in the area, which produces The Cincinnati Herald, The Dayton Defender, and Our Week. He is a partner in the law firm of Cohen, Todd, Kite & Standford, LLC.

== Ohio Senate ==
When incumbent Mark Mallory resigned from the Senate, Kearney as well as Catherine Barrett, Tyrone Yates, Steve Driehaus, David Pepper and Alicia Reece all were in the running to replace him. However, Senate Democrats decided on Kearney to ultimately take the appointment.

Only months into his appointed term, Kearney again faced Barrett in the primary election. However, only weeks before the primary election day, Barrett dropped out of the race, securing Kearney as the Democratic nominee. In the general election Kearney went on to face Republican Tom Brown. While the index favored Democrats, precautions were still taken due to the seat being lost only two cycles earlier to Republican Janet C. Howard. However, Kearney went on to defeat Brown by 34,000 votes.

For the 127th General Assembly, Kearney was appointed by Minority Leader Teresa Fedor to the Senate Finance and Financial Institutions Committee. He also was selected to serve as treasurer of the Ohio Legislative Black Caucus. In his first full term, Kearney also began his annual walk from Cincinnati to the Ohio Statehouse to underscore their commitment to fighting childhood obesity and supporting physical education.

In the 2010 election cycle, Kearney faced Republican Deborah McKenney in the general election, but won a second term by about 32,000 votes. In January 2012, Kearney was elected Minority Leader of the Senate, succeeding Capri Cafaro.

Kearney served as Minority Leader for the 130th General Assembly. On November 20, 2013, Democratic gubernatorial candidate Ed FitzGerald picked Kearney to be his running mate. On December 10, Kearney stepped down from the ticket due to increasing controversy surrounding back taxes owed by himself and his wife, for which they blamed financial difficulties at the Herald.

Kearney was featured in the 2016 documentary The Student Body for his sponsorship of S.B. 210, a bill requiring Ohio schools to administer BMI tests to their students. Although an interview did occur, Kearney's reticence towards being interviewed was featured prominently in the film. Kearney voiced his continued support for these policies.

== Electoral history ==
Ohio Senate 9th District: 2006 to 2010
Year	Democrat	Votes	Pct	Republican	Votes	Pct	Libertarian	Votes	Pct
2006	Eric Kearney	52,656	71.09%	Tom Brown	21,416	28.91%			
2010	Eric Kearney	50,862	67.22%	Debbie McKinney	22,252	29.41%	Jessica Mears	2,542	3.37%

== Personal life ==
Kearney is married to Jan-Michele Kearney and together they have two children, Celeste and Asher. They live in Cincinnati.
