= Cecil Thomas (politician) =

American politician (born 1952)

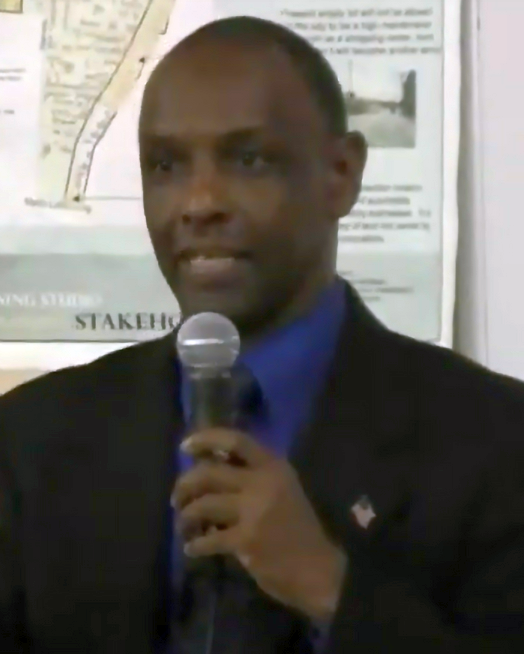
- Thomas in 2011

Member of the Ohio House of Representatives from the 25th district
- Incumbent
- Assumed office January 1, 2023
- Preceded by: Dontavius Jarrells

Member of the Ohio Senate from the 9th district
- In office January 6, 2015 – December 31, 2022
- Preceded by: Eric Kearney
- Succeeded by: Catherine Ingram

Member of the Cincinnati City Council
- In office 2006–2014

Personal details
- Born: October 21, 1952 (age 73) Alabama, U.S.
- Party: Democratic
- Education: University of Cincinnati (BS); Union Institute & University (BS)

Cecil L. Thomas (born October 21, 1952) is an American politician and former law enforcement officer who has served as a member of the Ohio House of Representatives from the 25th district since 2023. He previously served as a member of the Ohio Senate from the 9th district from 2015 to 2022.

== Early life and education ==
Thomas was born in rural northern Alabama and moved to Cincinnati, Ohio at a young age. He graduated from Withrow High School. In 1974, Thomas earned a Bachelor of Science degree in law enforcement technology from the University of Cincinnati. He later earned another Bachelor of Science degree, in criminal justice management, from the Union Institute & University.

== Career ==
After high school, he joined the Cincinnati police cadet program, and served the city of Cincinnati as a police officer for the next 27 years. In 2005, following his retirement from the police force, Thomas ran and won election to Cincinnati City Council, where he served for the next eight years.

In 2014, Thomas declared his candidacy for the Ohio Senate. Incumbent Eric Kearney was term-limited and could not run for another term. He was one of numerous Democrats to vie for the nomination, including Dale Mallory, who many saw as a frontrunner. He won the primary, and go on to face Charlie Winburn, another viable opponent, however this time Republican. However, Thomas defeated Winburn 56%-44%. Cecil was a candidate for the 2021 Cincinnati mayoral election, placing third in a field of six candidates.

== Abortion legislation ==
In 2019, Thomas was listed as a co-sponsor of Ohio Senate Bill 23, widely known as the "Heartbeat Bill." The bill bans most abortions once a fetal heartbeat is detectable—typically around six weeks into pregnancy—and includes no exceptions for rape or incest. Governor Mike DeWine signed the bill into law on April 11, 2019.

Although a Democrat, Thomas’s name appeared among the bill’s co-sponsors in the official legislative record. However, his inclusion has generated confusion and may have been procedural or clerical, as it does not reflect his broader voting record or public statements on reproductive rights.

The law was blocked by a Hamilton County court in September 2022, temporarily restoring abortion access in Ohio up to 22 weeks while legal challenges proceeded.
