= Ohio's 9th senatorial district =

American legislative district

Ohio's 9th State Senate district
Senator
Catherine Ingram; D–Cincinnati
- Demographics: 49.5% White; 40.8% Black; 5.1% Hispanic; 3.2% Asian; 1.7% Native American; 0.2% Hawaiian/Pacific Islander
- Population (2020) • Voting age • Citizens of voting age: 348,124; 275,750; 258,315

Ohio's 9th senatorial district was changed by the 2023 Redistricting and now consists of the Urban City of Cincinnati and the house districts of 24, 25 and 26. The district's current Ohio Senator is Democrat Catherine Ingram and was reelected for another term in November 2026.

== 2026 election results ==
Catherine Ingram (D) 95,580 79.5%

Linda Matthews (R) 24,602 20.5%

== Historically ==
Ohio's 9th senatorial district was a minority majority district based in urban Cincinnati. It encompassed central Hamilton County and the City of Cincinnati. Encompassing Ohio House districts 31, 32 and 33. It has a Cook PVI of D+24.

== List of senators ==
Senator	Party	Term	Notes
Calvin C. Johnson	Democrat	January 3, 1967 – February 9, 1970	Johnson resigned prior to the expiration of his term.
Bill Bowen	Democrat	February 11, 1970 – December 31, 1994	Bowen did not seek re-election in 1994.
Janet C. Howard	Republican	January 3, 1995 – December 31, 1998	Howard lost re-election in 1998 to Mark Mallory.
Mark Mallory	Democrat	January 5, 1999 – December 1, 2005	Mallory resigned to become mayor of Cincinnati, Ohio.
Eric Kearney	Democrat	December 6, 2005 – December 31, 2014	Kearney was term-limited in 2014.
Cecil Thomas	Democrat	January 6, 2015 – December 31, 2022	Thomas was term-limited in 2022.
Catherine Ingram	Democrat	January 3, 2023 – present	Incumbent
