= 2009 Cincinnati mayoral election =

- November 3, 2009
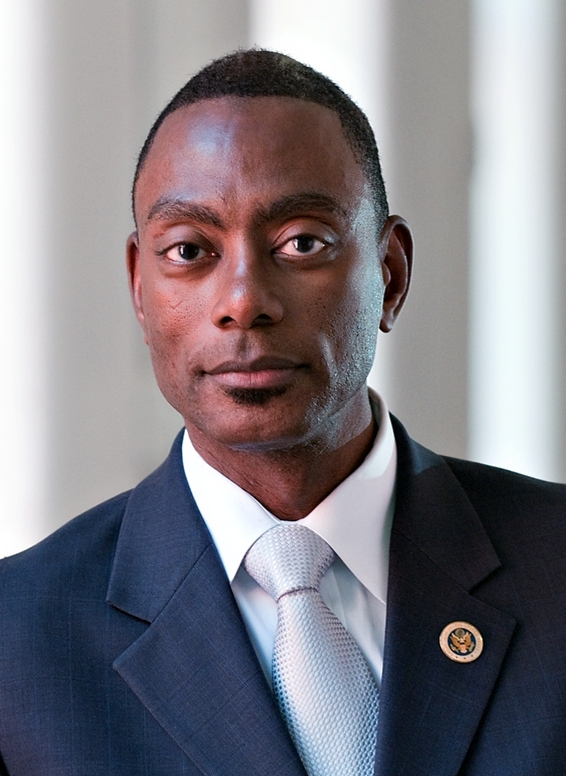

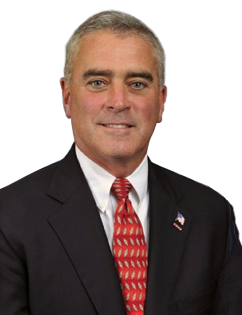
Candidate	Mark Mallory	Brad Wenstrup
Party	Nonpartisan	Nonpartisan
Popular vote	38,645	32,424
Percentage	54.34%	45.59%
Mayor before election
Mark Mallory
Democratic
Elected mayor
Mark Mallory
Democratic

The 2009 Cincinnati mayoral election took place on November 3, 2009, to elect the Mayor of Cincinnati, Ohio. Usually a nonpartisan primary is held where the top two candidates move on to the general election, however, incumbent mayor Mark Mallory and Brad Wenstrup were the only two candidates to file, so no primary election was held.

While the election was nonpartisan, Mallory was a known Democrat and Wenstrup was a known Republican.

== General election ==
Cincinnati mayoral election, 2009
Party	Candidate	Votes	%
Nonpartisan	Mark Mallory (incumbent)	38,645	54.34
Nonpartisan	Brad Wenstrup	32,424	45.59
Write-in	Tom Chandler	51	0.07
Total votes		71,120	100.00
