= Mark Mallory =

American politician, Mayor of Cincinnati

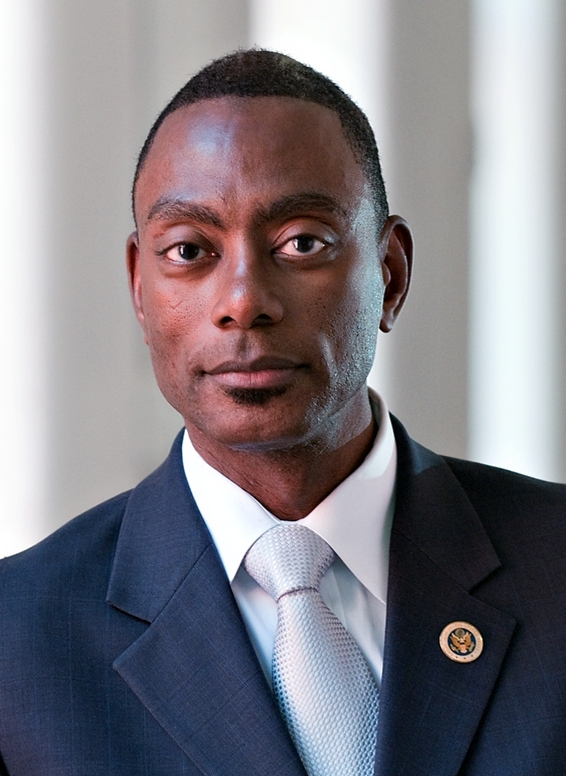

68th Mayor of Cincinnati
- In office December 1, 2005 – December 1, 2013
- Preceded by: Charlie Luken
- Succeeded by: John Cranley

Member of the Ohio Senate from the 9th district
- In office January 5, 1999 – December 1, 2005
- Preceded by: Janet C. Howard
- Succeeded by: Eric Kearney

Member of the Ohio House of Representatives from the 31st district
- In office January 3, 1995 – December 31, 1998
- Preceded by: William L. Mallory, Sr.
- Succeeded by: Catherine L. Barrett

Personal details
- Born: April 2, 1962 (age 64) Cincinnati, Ohio, U.S.
- Party: Democratic
- Relations: William L. Mallory Sr. (father); Dale Mallory (brother)
- Education: University of Cincinnati (BS)

Mark Mallory (born April 2, 1962) is an American politician who served as the 68th Mayor of Cincinnati from 2005 to 2013. A member of the Democratic Party, he previously represented Ohio's 9th senatorial district from 1999 to 2005, and Ohio's 31st house district from 1995 to 1998.

Mallory was the first two-term mayor under the city's revised strong-mayor system, the first directly elected African American mayor, the third African American mayor, and the first mayor in more than 70 years who did not come from the Cincinnati City Council. Since leaving office, Mallory has worked for FC Cincinnati as its Director of Community Development.

== Early life and education ==
Mallory was born and raised in West End, Cincinnati, and is the son of William L. Mallory Sr. and his wife Fannie. He graduated from the Cincinnati Academy of Math and Science￼ and holds a Bachelor of Science degree in Administrative Management from the University of Cincinnati. Mayor Mallory began his career in public service at the Cincinnati and Hamilton County Public Library. He worked there 14 years at a variety of positions, rising to Manager of Graphic Production and Assistant to the head of public relations.

== Career ==
Prior to his election in 2005, he served as assistant Minority Leader in the Ohio Senate. He won a seat in the Ohio House of Representatives in 1994, replacing his father who retired after serving the district for nearly 30 years. He served in the Ohio House from 1995 to 1998, when he was elected to the Senate.

In November 1998, Mark Mallory was elected to represent the 9th Senate District in the Ohio General Assembly, and in 2002 was elected to his second four-year term. He was the Assistant Minority Leader for the Senate Democratic Caucus during his seven years in the General Assembly. In 2003, Senator Mallory passed a resolution in the General Assembly ratifying the 14th Amendment, 135 years after it was amended to the US Constitution.

Mallory resigned his senate seat in 2005 to run for Mayor of Cincinnati. He defeated fellow Democrat David Pepper to win the election. Mallory was elected to a second term as Mayor in 2009.

In 2011, Mallory was featured in a Season 2 episode of the American reality television series Undercover Boss, going undercover performing various jobs around Cincinnati.

=== Opening day pitch debacle ===
On April 2, 2007, Mallory was scheduled to throw the ceremonial first pitch for the Cincinnati Reds' game on Opening Day. Despite claims that he had trained with the University of Cincinnati baseball team, his pitch flew thirty feet to the first base side of home plate, missing the intended target, Eric Davis. The ball hit the foot of umpire Sam Holbrook, who ejected Mallory before the contest even began. The pitch received national media attention, including appearances on Good Morning America and Cold Pizza, and Mallory was given a second chance on ABC's Jimmy Kimmel Live!, but again failed to come anywhere close to the target with his throw. He was given a "second, second-chance" and finally completed a toss to actor and former professional baseball player Kurt Russell. Mallory took the incident as an opportunity to advertise the city of Cincinnati.

== Personal life ==
Mallory's brother William L. Mallory Jr. is a Municipal Court judge, his brother Dwane Mallory is a Municipal Court Judge, his brother Dale Mallory was the State Representative in the Ohio House District once held by the Mayor and his father, and his brother Joe Mallory is the President of the Cincinnati chapter of NAACP. He is the son of former Ohio House of Representatives Majority Leader William L. Mallory Sr.

Political offices
Preceded by Charlie Luken	Mayor of Cincinnati, Ohio; 2005–2013	Succeeded by John Cranley
