= Catherine Ingram =

American politician

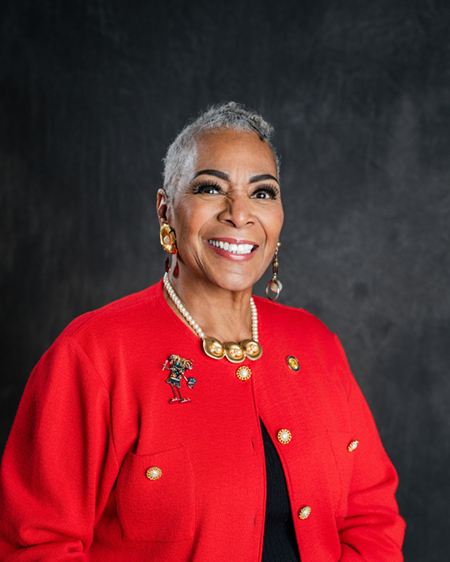

Member of the Ohio Senate from the 9th district
- Incumbent
- Assumed office January, 2023
- Preceded by: Cecil Thomas

Member of the Ohio House of Representatives from the 32nd district
- In office January 3, 2017 – January 2023
- Preceding: Christie Bryant
- Succeeded by: Bob Young

Personal details
- Party: Democratic
- Education: University of Cincinnati
- Website: https://www.ohiosenate.gov/members/catherine-d-ingram

Catherine D. Ingram is the senator from the 9th District of the Ohio Senate and formerly the state representative for the 32nd District of the Ohio House of Representatives. She is a Democrat. The district consists of portions of Cincinnati and Springfield Township, as well as Mount Healthy and North College Hill in Hamilton County.

== Life and career ==
Ingram is a lifelong resident of Cincinnati, where she attended public schools and the University of Cincinnati for both her bachelor's degree and M.B.A. Professionally, Ingram has worked as a realtor as well as an instructor at Northern Kentucky University. She is a mother and grandmother.

In the mid 1990s, Ingram was first elected to the Cincinnati Board of Education, and served on that board for more than twenty years, leaving to take the office of state representative.

== Ohio House of Representatives ==
After losing the Democratic primary for the Ohio Senate in 2014 to Cecil Thomas, Ingram unexpectedly received another opportunity to take a seat in the Ohio General Assembly in 2016 when state Representative Christie Bryant decided not to seek re-election after only one term. In a four-way primary, Ingram won the Democratic nomination with nearly 52% of the vote, a majority.

Ingram easily won the general election against Republican Matthew Wahlert with almost 77% of the vote. She was sworn into her first term on January 3, 2017.

Political offices
Preceded by Christie Bryant	Ohio House of Representatives, 32nd District; 2017–present	Incumbent
