= Janet C. Howard =

American politician

Janet Howard
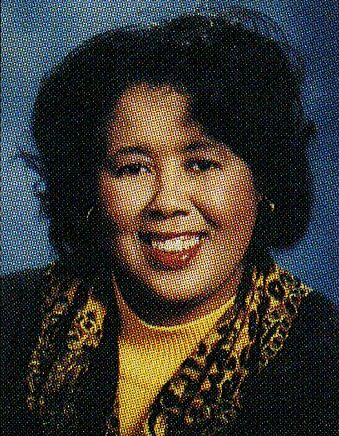

Member of the Ohio Senate from the 9th district
- In office January 3, 1995 – December 31, 1998
- Preceded by: Bill Bowen
- Succeeded by: Mark Mallory

Personal details
- Party: Republican

Janet C. Howard was a member of the Ohio Senate from -1998, representing the 9th District, which encompasses much of Cincinnati, Ohio. She was succeeded by Mark Mallory, who defeated her in 1998 during her reelection campaign.
