= Dale Mallory =

American politician

Member of the Ohio House of Representatives from the 32nd district
- In office January 2, 2007-December 31, 2014
- Preceded by: Catherine Barrett
- Succeeded by: Christie Bryant

Personal details
- Born: November 2, 1964 (age 61) Cincinnati, Ohio, U.S.
- Party: Democratic
- Relations: Mark Mallory
- Parent: William L. Mallory Sr.
- Education: Taft High School
- Profession: Aircraft Assembler
- Website: electdalemallory.com

Dale Mallory (born November 2, 1964) is an American politician and former Democratic member of the Ohio House of Representatives, representing the 32nd District from 2007 to 2014.

== Career ==
Mallory formerly served as a Cincinnati West End Community Council President, but later he became embroiled in a local dispute over a development for the homeless that led to his ouster as head of the council. Mallory worked for General Electric as a manufacturing facilitator. He is also a precinct executive in the Hamilton County Democratic Party and a ward chairman.

=== Ohio House of Representatives ===
With incumbent Catherine Barrett term limited, Mallory entered the race to succeed her. The seat had formerly been held by Mallory's father, William L. Mallory Sr. as well as his brother, Mark Mallory. In the 2006 Democratic primary, Mallory faced former Hamilton County Recorder Eve Bolton, as well as two others. However, he won with approximately 45% of the vote. He went on to win the general election against Republican Kimberly Hale by 9,000 votes. Mallory easily won reelection in 2008.

For the 128th General Assembly, Mallory was named Second Vice President of the Ohio Legislative Black Caucus, and Speaker of the House Armond Budish named Mallory Chairman of the House Environment & Brownfields Development Committee.

Mallory won reelection to a third term in the 2010 general election. He served on the committees of Agriculture and Natural Resources; Local Government; and as ranking member of the Transportation, Public Safety and Homeland Security Committee. He also served on the Southern Ohio Agricultural and Community Development Foundation Board of Trustees and the Ohio Athletic Commission.

With Cincinnati being hit hard with a bedbug epidemic, in 2011 Mallory urged the United States Environmental Protection Agency to allow the use of the pesticide propoxur to combat the pests.

In November 2012, Mallory won a final term against Republican Ron Mosby with 76.31% of the vote.

In April 2014, The Cincinnati Enquirer reported that Mallory had the worst attendance record of any healthy member of the General Assembly since 2011.

In May 2014, Mallory lost the Democratic primary for Ohio State Senator for the 9th District.

On October 29, 2014, Mallory pleaded guilty in Franklin County Municipal Court to two misdemeanor counts related to his having improperly accepted and failed to disclose gifts from lobbyists. Under a plea agreement, Mallory pleaded guilty to a first-degree misdemeanor count of filing a false disclosure form and a fourth-degree misdemeanor charge of improper gratuities. Mallory's attorney acknowledged that the charges were brought as the result of an FBI investigation into payday lending lobbying activities at the Ohio Statehouse, but advised the court that there was no indication Mallory was involved in any federal offenses. On December 11, 2014, Mallory was sentenced to a total of $600 in fines and 1 year of probation.
