= 2025 in Ohio =

- Decades: 2000s; 2010s; 2020s
- See also: History of Ohio; Historical outline of Ohio; List of years in Ohio; 2025 in the United States

The following is a list of events of the year 2025 in Ohio.

== Incumbents ==
=== State government ===
- Governor: Mike DeWine (R)
- Secretary of State: Frank LaRose (R)
- Attorney General: Dave Yost (R)
- Treasurer of State: Robert Sprague (R)

== Events ==
=== January ===
- January 5–6 – Southern and Central Ohio are hit by a blizzard.
- January 8 – Governor Mike DeWine signs Ohio House Bill 8 into law.
- January 20 – The Ohio State Buckeyes defeat the Notre Dame Fighting Irish 34–23 in the Playoff National Championship, their first win since the 2014 season.
- January 26 – 20 to 58 people are arrested during ICE raids in Geauga County.
- January 31 – The Findlay Village Mall closes.

=== February ===
- February 6 – 2 are killed and 4 are injured in a mass shooting in a New Albany warehouse.
- February 8 – The City of Springfield files a lawsuit against the Blood Tribe and other Neo-Nazi groups that threatened Haitian immigrants and helped spread rumors about the immigrants eating pets.

=== March ===
- March 20 – 2025 Southwest United States measles outbreak: The Ohio Department of Health confirms the state's first measles case of 2025.
- March 28 – Governor DeWine signs Ohio Senate Bill 1 into law, which bans diversity, equity, and inclusion at universities and forbids faculty from going on strike.

=== April ===
- April 29 – Ohio House Bill 249 is introduced, which would effectively ban drag shows from non-adult oriented spaces in the state.

=== May ===
- May 2 – A man intentionally strikes a Hamilton County Sheriff's deputy with a vehicle as the deputy directs traffic in Cincinnati, killing him. The suspect is identified as a man whose son was shot and killed by Cincinnati Police the day prior.
- May 25 – Japanese artist Takashi Murakami opens Takashi Murakami: Stepping on the Tail of a Rainbow, an exhibit at the Cleveland Museum of Art with over 100 works of art.
- May 30 – JoAnn Fabrics, which was founded in Cleveland and then headquartered in Hudson, closes the last of its stores.

=== June ===
- June 19 – A man is arrested and accused of threatening Representative Max Miller on the highway in Rocky River while displaying a Palestinian flag.

=== July ===
- July 26 – In London, a baby is born from an embryo frozen since 1994.
- July 28 – Former Columbus Police Officer Adam Coy is sentenced to 15 years to life for the murder of Andre Hill, who Coy shot and killed outside a home in 2020.

=== August ===
- August 16 – Governor DeWine directs the Ohio National Guard to deploy 150 troops to Washington, D.C. to support the federal takeover of law enforcement in the capital.
- August 18 – Former Senator Sherrod Brown announces that he will run for Senate again in 2026.

=== October ===
- October 7 – The United Football League announces the formation of the Columbus Aviators.

=== November ===
- November 2 – Nine people, including multiple juveniles, are injured in a shooting at a party being held at an Airbnb rental in Bath Township, Summit County.
- November 4
  - 2025 Cincinnati mayoral election: Cincinnati Mayor Aftab Pureval wins reelection, beating Republican challenger and JD Vance's half-brother Cory Bowman.
  - 2025 Cleveland mayoral election: Cleveland Mayor Justin Bibb wins reelection, beating challenger Laverne Gore.
  - 2025 Dayton mayoral election: Dayton City Commissioner Shenise Turner-Sloss beats incumbent Mayor Jeff Mims to be elected mayor of Dayton.
  - 2025 Toledo mayoral election: Incumbent Mayor Wade Kapszukiewicz wins reelection, beating challenger Roberto Torres.
- November 21 – A Blendon Township Police officer is found not guilty of murder in the shooting death of Ta'Kiya Young.

=== December ===
- December 5 – Final Battle (2025)
- December 30 – Married couple Monique and Spencer Tepe are found shot to death in their Columbus home. In January 2026, Monique's ex-husband is arrested and charged with their murders.

== See also ==
- 2025 in the United States
