= 2026 in Ohio =

- Decades: 2000s; 2010s; 2020s
- See also: History of Ohio; Historical outline of Ohio; List of years in Ohio; 2026 in the United States

The following is a list of events of the year 2026 in Ohio.

== Incumbents ==
=== State government ===
- Governor: Mike DeWine (R)
- Secretary of State: Frank LaRose (R)
- Attorney General: Dave Yost (R)
- Treasurer of State: Robert Sprague (R)

== Events ==
=== February ===
- February 11 – Lourdes University in Sylvania announces it will close at the end of the 2025–26 school year.
- February 25 – A fire at a farm in London kills over 6,000 hogs.

=== March ===
- March 1 – Nine people are injured in a mass shooting at a music venue in Cincinnati.
- March 2 – The bodies of two young girls are found in suitcases in Cleveland. The two girls are later identified as sisters, and their mother is charged with murder.
- March 9 – Ohio State University President Ted Carter resigns after disclosing an "inappropriate relationship" to the board of trustees.
- March 17 – A meteor passes over Ohio, fragmenting over Valley City.
- March 21 – Denison beats Scranton 55–41 to win the 2026 NCAA Division III women's basketball tournament.
- March 23 – Immigration and Customs Enforcement agents are deployed to 14 airports nationwide, including Cleveland Hopkins International Airport.

=== April ===
- April 9 – The Women's National Basketball Association announces an expansion team in Cleveland, set to begin play in 2028.

=== May ===
- May 4 – The Modern College of Design in Kettering announces it is closing at the end of the semester.
- May 5 – Primaries are held.
- May 7 – Former Franklin County Sheriff's Deputy Jason Meade is found guilty of reckless homicide in the shooting of Casey Goodson, who Meade shot as he entered his grandmother's home holding sandwiches in 2020.

=== June ===
- June 1 – Political blogger D.J. Byrnes is arrested outside the Ohio State Capitol over a message he sent to State Senator Jerry Cirino, in which he called Cirino "Young Mussolini" and attached an edited image of Shrek with an exposed penis.
- June 3 – Ohio State University agrees to pay $100 million to 279 former students who were allegedly sexually assaulted by campus physician Richard Strauss between 1977 and 1978, settling a lawsuit filed in 2019.
- June 6 – 12 people are injured in a mass shooting at the Old West End Festival in Toledo.
- June 11 – The FBI conducts a series of raids across Ohio targeting the Ohio Organizing Collaborative and its employees.
- June 30 – Police in Hamden arrest four adults and find 16 children from ages 1.5 to 18 in a home living in what officials call "deplorable" conditions. The four adults are charged with felony child endangerment.

=== July ===
- July 1 – Three people are killed in a fire at a motel in Wooster Township, Wayne County.
- July 5 – A gunman kills his ex-girlfriend and her daughter at a home in Rittman. When officers arrive, he fires at them, killing one and injuring three, as well as a K-9 unit. The gunman kills himself.
- July 19 – Five people drown in the Scioto River in Powell. The sheriff's office says the drownings occurred after several people attempted to help a person who was struggling to swim in the river.
- July 30 – A house explodes in Canton. Two people are injured.

=== August ===
- August 2 – Senator Bernie Moreno says his son-in-law, Representative Max Miller, should not serve in the House. Miller was accused of domestic violence towards his wife Emily Moreno, who is the senator's daughter.
- August 4
  - In basketball, the Women's National Basketball Association (WNBA) announces that the expansion team in Cleveland will be called the Sirens. The organization will debut in 2028.
  - The House Ethics Committee opens an investigation into Max Miller over domestic abuse allegations.
- August 9–11 – The Patriot Games are held in Geneva.
- August 18 – Two employees are killed in an explosion at a Toledo recycling business.
- August 21 – A fire destroys the historic Friendship Baptist Church in Cleveland. A 19-year-old man is later charged with arson.
- August 23 – San Francisco 49ers owner Jed York is arrested in East Palestine on suspicions of soliciting a prostitute. He pleads no contest to disorderly conduct and possessing criminal tools.

=== September ===
- September 2 – Former Columbus Division of Police Officer Ricky Anderson pleads guilty to reckless homicide in the 2022 killing of Donovan Lewis.
- September 6 – A man lunges at Democratic candidate for governor Amy Acton during a campaign stop at the Canfield Fair in Canfield, injuring several staffers. The man is arrested and found to have multiple weapons on him.
- September 8 – The owners of The Blade newspaper in Toledo announce they are selling the newspaper and will shut it down at the end of the year if a buyer is not found.

=== October ===
- October 19 – 2026 Ohio gubernatorial election: Republican candidate Vivek Ramaswamy's campaign launches an ad featuring Democratic opponent Amy Acton's estranged mother Donna Arthur, who urges viewers not to vote for Acton. The ad sparks controversy, as the estrangement between Acton and her mother stems from Acton's step-father Cledith Arthur, who was charged with raping Acton when she was a child. Incumbent Republican Governor Mike DeWine, who supports Ramaswamy's campaign, later calls the ad "deeply troubling" and says it should be taken down.
- October 21 – A tank containing the toxic chemical glycidyl methacrylate explodes in Toledo, leading to evacuations and shelter-in-place orders.

=== November ===
- November 3 – 2026 Ohio elections:
  - 2026 Ohio House of Representatives election:
  - 2026 Ohio Senate election
  - 2026 Ohio Attorney General election
  - 2026 Ohio gubernatorial election: Amy Acton wins the election, beating Vivek Ramaswamy.
  - 2026 Ohio Secretary of State election
  - 2026 United States Senate special election in Ohio: Former senator Sherrod Brown beats incumbent Jon Husted in the election.
  - 2026 Ohio State Auditor election
  - 2026 Ohio State Treasurer election
  - 2026 United States House of Representatives elections in Ohio: Democrats flip three seats in the House, including Max Miller's district.
- November 19 – The Cincinnati Zoo announces that Fiona, a 9-year-old hippopotamus, has died after digesting a hat that had accidentally fallen into her enclosure. The zoo says that a child had thrown the hat in the air, where it was caught on a ceiling fan and flung through a small opening above the viewing windows.

=== Sports ===
- 2026 Cincinnati Bengals season
- 2026 Cleveland Browns season
- 2025–26 Cleveland Cavaliers season
- 2026 Cincinnati Reds season

== Deaths ==
- March 7 – Cameron Ontko, 33, American football player (BC Lions).

== See also ==
- 2026 in the United States
