= Columbus, Ohio shooting =

Columbus, Ohio shooting may refer to:

- Columbus nightclub shooting, a mass shooting at a nightclub that killed five, including musician Dimebag Darrell and the gunman
- Murder of Andre Hill, the fatal shooting of an African American man by Columbus police in 2020
- Killing of Ma'Khia Bryant, the fatal shooting of an African American girl by Columbus police in 2021
