= 2023 in Ohio =

- Decades: 2000s; 2010s; 2020s
- See also: History of Ohio; Historical outline of Ohio; List of years in Ohio; 2023 in the United States

The following is a list of events of the year 2023 in Ohio.

== Incumbents ==
=== State government ===
- Governor: Mike DeWine (R)
- Secretary of State: Frank LaRose (R)
- Attorney General: Dave Yost (R)
- Treasurer of State: Robert Sprague (R)

== Events ==
- February 3 – 2023 Ohio train derailment: A train carrying 20 cars of hazardous material derails in East Palestine. The material was burned, which releases hydrogen chloride and phosgene into the air, causing an evacuation of all residents within a one-mile radius of the crash and an emergency response across three states.
- March 4 – A Norfolk Southern train derails in Clark County with local residents advised to shelter in place. The derailment comes just over one month after the derailment of a Norfolk Southern train carrying hazardous materials in East Palestine. However, no hazardous materials are known to be involved in the Clark County derailment.
- April 29 – Thirty-four people are injured in a roof collapse near the Ohio State University in Columbus.
- June 15 – 2023 Doerman killings: A father in Monroe Township, Clermont County kills his three sons.
- August 22 – 2023 Clark County, Ohio school bus crash: A van crossing the centerline caused a bus to overturn into a culvert, killing one student and injuring 26 others.
- November 7 – Voters approve the 2023 Ohio Issue 2 to legalize recreational marijuana in the state.
- November 14 – Six people are killed and eighteen others are injured in a crash between a semi-trailer and a charter bus on Interstate 70 in Licking County.
- November 28 – Three people are killed in an explosion at a business in Hillsboro.

== See also ==
- 2023 in the United States
