= Deputy mayor =

Governance position

Deputy Mayor
Occupation
- Synonyms: Vice mayor, mayor pro tempore, assistant mayor, maire-adjoint, teniente de alcalde
- Occupation type: Elective or appointive office
- Activity sectors: Local government

Description
- Competencies: Acting as mayor in the mayor's absence, presiding over city council, overseeing specific policy areas, serving as a successor to the mayoral office
- Fields of employment: Municipal and local governments
- Related jobs: Mayor, city councillor, city manager

The deputy mayor (also known as vice mayor, mayor pro tempore, and assistant mayor) is an elective or appointive office of the second-ranking official that is present in many local governments.

== Duties and functions ==
Many elected deputy mayors are members of the local government who are given the title and serve as acting mayor in the mayor's absence. Appointive deputy mayors serve at the pleasure of the mayor and may function as chief operating officers.

There may be within the same municipal government one or more deputy mayors appointed to oversee policy areas together with a popularly-elected vice mayor who serves as the mayor's successor in the event the office is vacated by death, resignation, disability, or impeachment.

In other cities, the deputy mayor presides over the city council, and may not vote except to break ties. Like the deputy mayor in other systems, the popularly elected deputy mayor becomes an Acting Mayor in the original mayor's absence. As previously noted in some cities, this office is elected separately and does not entail the elevation by the council of one of its members to be speaker. In some U.S. cities, the mayor and deputy mayor run together as a citywide ticket similar to how the president and vice president run at the national level. In other cities, particularly those with council–manager governments, the council selects one of its members to be vice mayor or mayor pro tem(pore).

=== United States ===
==== New York City, New York ====
In New York City, there are multiple deputy mayors who handle coordination of specific policy areas where the First Deputy Mayor serves as the general deputy mayor for the Mayor of New York City.

==== St. Louis, Missouri ====
In St. Louis, Missouri, there are multiple deputy mayors who handle coordination of specific policy areas where the deputy Mayors serves as the general deputy's mayors for the Mayor of St. Louis.

==== Cincinnati, Ohio ====
In Cincinnati, Ohio, the vice mayor is appointed by the mayor from amongst the elected city council members. On November 18, 2021, then-Mayor-Elect Aftab Pureval announced that Cincinnati City Councilmember Jan-Michele Kearney would serve as vice mayor once his administration assumed office in January. She was sworn in on January 4, 2022. Jan-Michele Kearney

=== Canada ===
The office of deputy mayor exists in many, but not all, Canadian cities; however, it is not an independent or directly-elected position in its own right, and is simply an additional title held by one or more sitting members of the municipal council alongside their role as councillor. The method of selection for the role varies by city, however.

The Deputy Mayor of Toronto is a title conferred on one or more members of Toronto City Council, who assist the mayor. One "statutory" deputy mayor is always appointed, although mayors have the discretion to appoint additional ceremonial deputy mayors. Most commonly, a mayor who chooses to appoint multiple deputy mayors will appoint four, with one representing each of the city's four main districts of Old Toronto-East York, North York, Scarborough and Etobicoke, with one of those four holding the "statutory" position. In the event of a vacancy in the mayor's office, the statutory deputy mayor exercises limited mayoral powers on a caretaker basis to ensure continuity of government function until a by-election can be held to elect a new mayor, but does not formally assume the office of mayor and cannot fully exercise all of the mayor's powers.

Ottawa appoints three deputy mayors by an internal vote of the council, while Winnipeg's mayor appoints a single deputy at their own discretion.

Some cities in Alberta appoint both a deputy mayor and an acting mayor, with the deputy's role being to act on the mayor's behalf if the mayor is unavailable, and the acting mayor's role being to act on the mayor's behalf if the mayor and the deputy mayor are both unavailable.

In some cities where the entire council is elected at-large rather than under a ward system, such as North Bay, the deputy mayor position may be automatically assumed by the councillor who received the most votes on election day. In the majority of cities, however, a simple rotation is set up under which all members of council will have an opportunity to serve as deputy mayor for several months within the council term, or the council conducts yearly internal elections to select a deputy for a term of one year.

=== India ===
In India, the Deputy Mayor is the second-highest elected position in a Municipal Corporation, next to the Mayor, in urban local self-government bodies established in major cities. The Deputy Mayor is elected by the elected councillors of the Municipal Corporation from among themselves.

=== Israel ===
In Israel, according to the Local Authorities (Election and Term of Mayor and Deputy Mayors) Act, 5735-1975, a Mayor is usually elected in "personal, general, direct, equal and secret elections", with election by a local council being made only if no candidate runs for mayor, a candidate for mayor in a single-candidate election is rejected (in Israel, unlike in the UK, if only one candidate runs he is not automatically elected, and voters would vote either for that candidate or against him), or both candidates advancing to the runoff received an equal number of votes and the tie remains unbroken after adding the number of first-round votes cast for them with the number of second-round votes cast for them. However, deputy mayors are always elected by the local council, of which one is (or, in certain local authorities two are) the Designated Acting Mayor, elected after nomination by the Mayor.

=== France ===
The French term for deputy mayor is maire-adjoint or adjoint au maire. The first deputy mayor is called premier adjoint.

This term should not be confused with the other French term député-maire, which refers to the dual mandate of a mayor who is also a deputy of the National Assembly. This practice was frequent in the French Fifth Republic, until the legislative elections held on 31 March 2017, after which a mayor cannot hold both mandates (article LO 141-1 of the electoral code).

=== Philippines ===
All cities and municipalities in the Philippines have a vice mayor. The vice mayor is the presiding officer of the Sangguniang Panlungsod (city council) or the Sangguniang Bayan (municipal council), as the case may be. If the mayor dies, is removed from office, or is incapable to discharge their duties, the vice mayor becomes the mayor for the remainder of the term. In elections, candidates for mayor and vice mayor are often running mates, although each position is voted separately.

==== Manila ====
In Manila, each congressional district has an appointed deputy mayor who coordinates the projects and activities of the elected city mayor.

==== Davao City ====
In Davao City, there is both an elected vice-mayor as a direct constitutionally mandated deputy of the Mayor of Davao City and appointed deputy mayors. The deputy mayors are appointed to administer each ethnic minorities situated in Davao City.

=== Spain ===
In Spain, this function is performed by a "teniente de alcalde."

=== United Kingdom ===
In the United Kingdom, there are different types of deputy mayors.

==== London ====
In London, the Mayor of London has a team of Deputy Mayors covering varying policy areas led by a Statutory Deputy Mayor who deputises for the Mayor in case of absence or illness.
