= 2021 in Ohio =

- Decades: 2000s; 2010s; 2020s
- See also: History of Ohio; Historical outline of Ohio; List of years in Ohio; 2021 in the United States

The following is a list of events of the year 2021 in Ohio.

== Incumbents ==
=== State government ===
- Governor: Mike DeWine (R)
- Secretary of State: Frank LaRose (R)
- Attorney General: Dave Yost (R)
- Treasurer of State: Robert Sprague (R)

== Events ==
- January 19: Bishop Daniel Thomas of the Diocese of Toledo issues statements on the deaths of a suspect and police officer, and the vandalism and arson at Our Lady, Queen of the Most Holy Rosary Cathedral in Toledo.
- February 11: Governor Mike DeWine lifts a statewide curfew from 10:00 p.m. to 5:00 a.m. EST, citing drop of COVID-19.
- April 9: An explosion at a paint plant in northeast Columbus, kills one person and injures several more.
- May 25: Four people are killed in a mass shooting at an apartment complex in West Jefferson. The killings mark the village's first homicides in nine years.
- August 27: The U.S. Department of Agriculture reports the world's first confirmed SARS-CoV-2 infection in wild white-tailed deer in Ohio..
- November 2:
  - 2021 Ohio's 15th congressional district special election
  - 2021 Ohio's 11th congressional district special election

=== Sports ===
- 2021 Cincinnati Bengals season
- 2021 Cleveland Browns season
- 2020–21 Cleveland Cavaliers season
- 2021 Cincinnati Reds season

== See also ==
- 2021 in the United States
