= List of killings by law enforcement officers in the United States, August 2022 =

This is a list of people reported killed by non-military law enforcement officers in the United States in August 2022, whether in the line of duty or not, and regardless of reason or method. The listing documents the occurrence of a death, making no implications regarding wrongdoing or justification on the part of the person killed or officer involved. Killings are arranged by date of the incident that caused death. Different death dates, if known, are noted in the description. The table below lists 99 people.

== August 2022 ==
Date	Name (age) of deceased	Race of deceased	Location	Description
2022-08-31	Jacob M. Jamrozy (39)	White	Omaha, NE	
2022-08-31	Dominic Jeter (23)	Black	Concord Mills, NC	
2022-08-31	Agustin Flores (41)	Hispanic	Los Angeles, CA	
2022-08-30	Donovan Lewis (20)	_{Black}	Columbus, Ohio	Police arrived at Lewis's apartment to serve a warrant for improperly handling a firearm, assault, and domestic violence. When police entered Lewis's bedroom he sat up with an object in his hand, and officers shot him. No weapons were found on Lewis but a vape pen was found nearby.
2022-08-30	William Isaac Rich (22)	Black	Cedar Rapids, Iowa	Cedar Rapids police arrived at an affordable housing center to respond to a domestic disturbance call. Police detained William Isaac Rich on scene. While being detained on scene, Rich pulled out a weapon, prompting officers to shoot. Rich died on scene.
2022-08-30	Derrick Harrell (59)	Black	Hayti, MO	
2022-08-30	Jack E. McGlothlin (37)	White	Powell, WY	
2022-08-29	Brian Simmons (38)	White	Maricopa, AZ	
2022-08-29	Andrew Todd Ainsworth (60)	Asian	Charlottesville, VA	
2022-08-28	Doreen Jacius (48)	White	East Granby, Connecticut	An Avon police officer shot and killed his wife, the director of the East Granby Public Library, before shooting himself.
2022-08-28	Brian Underwood (47)	Unknown race	Sarasota, FL	
2022-08-28	Lamar A. Davis (18)	Black	Bangor Charter Township, MI	
2022-08-28	Peter T. Collins (40)	Unknown race	Tacoma, WA	
2022-08-28	Roy Cravin (54)	Black	Houston, TX	
2022-08-28	J’Quinton D. Hopson (38)	Black	Fort Worth, TX	
2022-08-28	Keshawn Thomas (27)	Black/Hispanic	Albuquerque, New Mexico	Police were called to a gas station for a car that had been parked there for several hours. 3 police officers found Thomas passed out in the drivers seat, and when awakened appeared intoxicated. Thomas initially cooperated with police, telling them he had weapons in the car and handing over a loaded firearm magazine. Thomas said that he would call for a ride, but when twisting around the officers claimed they saw him pull out a gun and opened fire, striking and fatally injuring him.
2022-08-27	Samuel Paul Ranson (50)	White	Charleston, WV	
2022-08-27	Brandi Simpson (43)	Black	Sacramento, CA	
2022-08-27	Christopher Rudolph (39)	White	Richwoods, MO	
2022-08-27	George Maxie (69)	Unknown race	Coushatta, LA	
2022-08-27	Vance Ledeau (34)	Native Hawaiian or Pacific Islander	Missoula, MT	
2022-08-26	Vance Ledeau (34)	Native American	Missoula, Montana	Police shot a robbery suspect. Few details were released, but officers from the Missoula Police, Missoula County Sheriff's Office, Bureau of Land Management, United States Forest Service, Airport Police, Rivalli County Sheriff's Office and Montana Highway Patrol were involved in the response. A county attorney later stated that Ledeau had been holding an air pistol that resembled a handgun.
2022-08-26	Joshua David Amodeo (29)	Black	Blacksburg, VA	
2022-08-26	Frank Anthony Correa (58)	Unknown race	Oakley, CA	
2022-08-26	Caleb Tussey (24)	White	Buhl, ID	
2022-08-25	Richard Skinner (45)	White	Muncie, IN	
2022-08-25	Francisco Javier Galarza (49)	Hispanic	Tucson, AZ	
2022-08-24	Jesus Angel Manjarrez (26)	Hispanic	Waukegan, IL	
2022-08-24	Jason Owens (37)	White	Nutter Fort, West Virginia	Police attempted to arrest Owens for a parole violation after his father's funeral. The United States Marshals Service stated Owens drew a gun on officers, though several witnesses disputed this.
2022-08-24	Ryan Marzi (37)	White	Canterbury, Connecticut	Two troopers responded to a domestic violence call and encountered Marzi. One trooper got into a physical altercation with Marzi, after which the other tased him for a minute. Marzi died at his home in Hebron four days later. A medical examiner determined that the physical altercation with the first trooper had caused a blood clot in Marzi's leg that led to his death. His death was ruled a homicide.
2022-08-23	Geraldo Reyes (32)	Hispanic	Cut Off, LA	
2022-08-23	Jose Velazquez (24)	Hispanic	Splendora, TX	
2022-08-23	Michael Saunders (28)	Unknown race	Blue Springs, MO	
2022-08-23	Melvin Porter (52)	Black	Splendora, TX	
2022-08-23	Name Withheld (32)	Unknown race	Pryor, MT	
2022-08-23	Laurence Dickson (69)	White	McMinnville, OR	
2022-08-23	Scholar Wang (48)	Asian	San Diego, CA	
2022-08-22	Timothy Green (37)	Black	Olympia, WA	
2022-08-22	Mable Arrington (42)	Black	Biloxi, MS	
2022-08-22	Elizabeth Delano (41)	White	Butler Township, OH	
2022-08-22	Francisco Pena (59)	Hispanic	Sparks, NV	
2022-08-21	Ricardo Dorado Jr. (33)	Hispanic	Atlanta, GA	
2022-08-21	Terry Starkweather (36)	White	Spokane, Washington	Two deputies arrived at a self storage unit after learning that a man with outstanding felony warrants (Starkweather) was there. The deputies discovered Starkweather in his truck with one deputy parking his police vehicle in front of the truck while the other approached by foot. Starkweather acknowledged the deputies presence then quickly reversed the truck toward the officer on foot who fired his gun. Starkweather then drove his truck forward toward the same deputy who shot again and killed him.
2022-08-21	Nasanto Crenshaw (17)	Black	Greensboro, North Carolina	Crenshaw was shot and killed as he was fleeing a traffic stop.
2022-08-20	Randy Wilhelm (56)	White	Mount Vernon, OH	
2022-08-20	Bradley Wilhelm (53)	White	Mount Vernon, OH	
2022-08-20	Otis French, Jr. (32)	Black	Bay Minette, Alabama	Bay Minette City officer conducts traffic stop in the Douglasville community of Bay Minette for a faulty taillight. After approaching the vehicle and conversing with Mr. French for several minutes, the officer asks French to exit his vehicle without cause. French had no warrants or criminal history, and was described as quiet and -mannered. For unknown reasons, once outside of his vehicle for another several minutes, French flees on foot. The officer pursued French, and the two engaged in a tussle, where according to the officer, French attempted to remove the taser from the officer's belt. The officer responded by pulling his firearm and shooting French an undisclosed number of times, resulting in his death. The officer involved, as well as the Bay Minette City Police Department, are still under investigation and have released no information in regards to the events of that morning, despite community outcry.
2022-08-20	Adum Mahamat (25)	Black	Tucson, Arizona	Authorities responded to a call about a fight at a lounge located on Tucson's south side. Officers came upon Mahamat, who was holding a handgun. Mahamat allegedly ignored several commands to drop the weapon so two officers opened fire. Mahamat later died at a local hospital.
2022-08-19	Brenda Donahue (60)	Unknown race	Charlotte, NC	
2022-08-19	Lorena Suarez (31)	Hispanic	Tulare, CA	
2022-08-18	Tyler Sweeney (29)	Unknown race	Sarasota, FL	
2022-08-18	Name Withheld ()	Unknown race	Houston, TX	
2022-08-17	Christian Arriola Gomez (24)	Hispanic	Los Angeles, CA	
2022-08-16	Jamie Ezequiel Robles (34)	Unknown race	Miami Springs, FL	
2022-08-15	Jeremy Willie Horton (32)	Black	Miami Springs, FL	
2022-08-15	Michael Mills (36)	White	Ludlow, VT	
2022-08-15	Mercedes Martinez (26)	Hispanic	Norman, OK	
2022-08-15	Ethan Mestes (22)	Hispanic	Norman, OK	
2022-08-14	Divinity Cureton (30)	Black	Coconut Creek, FL	
2022-08-14	Melanie Garcia (36)	Hispanic	Santa Fe, NM	
2022-08-14	Nykon Brandon (35)	White	Salt Lake City, UT	
2022-08-13	Michael Ahrens (33)	White	Waterloo, IA	
2022-08-12	Darrel Hood (32)	Black	Richland Hills, TX	
2022-08-12	Daniel Pesavento (33)	White	Appleton, WI	
2022-08-11	Tyler Mendez (27)	Unknown race	Eutawville, SC	
2022-08-11	Byron Hayes (33)	Unknown race	Victorville, CA	
2022-08-11	Ricky Shiffer (42)	White	Clinton County, Ohio	Police pursued Shiffer after he attempted to break into the FBI field office in Cincinnati with a rifle. Following a standoff police shot Shiffer when he allegedly raised the gun towards police.
2022-08-11	Terrance Skye Posey	Native American	Ethete, Wyoming	
2022-08-11	Gabriel Mesa (48)	Unknown race	Carlsbad, NM	
2022-08-10	Lane Morgan Caviness (48)	White	Key Largo, Florida	Police responded to reports of a suicidal man and shot Caviness after he allegedly pointed a gun at deputies in what police called a suicide by cop. Police initially stated Caviness was an off-duty federal law enforcement officer but later clarified he was a member of the Federal Flight Deck Officer program, a Federal Air Marshal Service-run program that deputizes trained pilots and allows them to carry weapons on aircraft.
2022-08-10	Jordan Urenovitch (23)	White	Hazleton, PA	
2022-08-09	Jacob Michael James (21)	White	Sioux Falls, SD	
2022-08-08	William Chad Newman (40)	White	Hoxie, AR	
2022-08-08	Edris Marrero (75)	Hispanic	Kingsport, TN	
2022-08-08	Javier Alanis (23)	Hispanic	Houston, TX	
2022-08-07	Zachary James Garrard (31)	Unknown race	Kansas CIty, MO	
2022-08-07	Jordyn Hansen (21)	White	Otsego, Minnesota	Wright County deputies shot and killed Hansen at about 1 a.m. after he called 9-1-1 to report a threat of physical harm to himself and his family. When police arrived, he agree to go to the hospital for an evaluation, but he grabbed a knife from the kitchen and was unsuccessfully demobilized with a taser. An officer opened fire, killing Hansen.
2022-08-06	Ezequiel Ayala (26)	Hispanic	Yakima County, Washington	Police officers responded to shots fired at a gathering where one person suffered multiple gunshot wounds. Police determined the suspect's name and possible location and later encountered Ayala near his mother's home. When deputies tried to stop Ayala, he fled in his vehicle and officers pursued him to the vineyards. Ayala fled on foot into the vineyards and engaged police in a shootout. Ayala was shot and died at the scene. Deputies said they were shot at multiple times and recovered a 9mm pistol from the suspect with a partially expended magazine.
2022-08-06	Douglas Stanton (59)	White	Rouseville, PA	
2022-08-06	Marty Robin Hutto (50)	White	Moulton, AL	
2022-08-06	Bryan Matthew Richardson (28)	White	Orlando, Florida	Richardson and his brother, 21-year-old Dylan Michael Jimenez, got into a confrontation with a man outside a hotel, which ended with Jimenez and the other man shooting each other. As an off-duty paramedic tended to Jimenez, police arrived. After a bystander told police Richardson had a gun, an officer attempted to take it from him, at which point a second officer fired. Both Jimenez and Richardson were pronounced dead at the hospital. The man who shot Jimenez survived.
2022-08-05	Alexander Dekontee Weah (23)	Black	Clemmons, NC	
2022-08-05	Wallace Sims Wainwright (81)	White	Clermont, FL	
2022-08-05	Derrick Lee Aranda Jr. (25)	White	Northglenn, CO	
2022-08-04	Tony Dehart (40)	White	Wadsworth, NV	
2022-08-04	Matthew Wayne Vaughn (29)	Unknown race	Klamath Falls, OR	
2022-08-03	Earnest Borders (57)	Black	Lake Wales, FL	
2022-08-03	Dominic Spears (39)	Unknown	Spokane, Washington	Officers spotted a van they believed was connected to a robbery. Two of the van's three occupants exited the van and were arrested, Spears, the third occupant, sped off and crashed a short distance away. Spears barricaded himself in the van and ended up in a shootout with police. Spears was shot and killed during the shootout.
2022-08-03	Raymond Derek Gladman (83)	White	St George, UT	
2022-08-03	Charles Ricky Graham (63)	White	Spartanburg, SC	
2022-08-02	Thang Duc Doan (51)	Asian	Buford, GA	
2022-08-02	Presley Eze (36)	Black	Las Cruces, New Mexico	Police responded to a report that Eze had stolen a beer from a gas station. The officer pulled Eze out of his vehicle, causing a struggle, during which the officer shot Eze. In 2023 the officer was charged with voluntary manslaughter.
2022-08-01	Javier Antonio Cordero Nevárez (16)	Hispanic	San Juan, Puerto Rico	
2022-08-01	Andrew Martinez (35)	Hispanic	Mapleton, North Dakota	The sheriff's office responded to a report of shots fired at Martinez residence. Martinez's neighbor said they saw the man outside with a handgun, appearing intoxicated. Four officers fired their weapons when Martinez, armed with a semi-automatic rifle, appeared in the doorway of a residence and pointed the weapon at them following a four-hour standoff.
2022-08-01	Julius Filep (55)	White	East Brunswick, NJ	www.njoag.gov/update-state-grand-jury-declines-to-criminally-charge-officer-who-struck-a-motorist-outside-of-a-disabled-vehicle-while-responding-to-a-multiple-car-accident-and-fire-in-east-brunswick/ www.nj.com/middlesex/2023/04/for-mourning-family-questions-swirl-20-months-after-nj-dad-killed-in-police-car-accident.html
2022-08-01	Walter Lee Osborne, Jr. (26)	Black	Calhoun, Georgia	
2022-08-01	Norma Hartman (74)	White	Barbourville, Kentucky	
2022-08-01	Travis Caleb Woody (24)	White	Green Mountain, North Carolina	
2022-08-01	Darin Gray (56)	White	Tallassee, Alabama	

== See also ==
- Death in custody § United States
- Henry A. Wallace Police Crime Public Database
- List of cases of police brutality
- List of countries with annual rates and counts for killings by law enforcement officers
- List of law enforcement officers killed in the line of duty in the United States
- List of law enforcement officers convicted for an on-duty killing in the United States
- List of shootings by US immigration agents
- List of police reforms related to the George Floyd protests
- List of unarmed African Americans killed by law enforcement officers in the United States
- Lists of killings by law enforcement officers
- Police brutality in the United States
- Police misconduct § United States
- Police riot § United States
- Police use of deadly force in the United States
