= Jan-Michele Kearney =

American businesswoman, attorney, and politician

Vice Mayor of Cincinnati
- Incumbent
- Assumed office January 2022
- Mayor: Aftab Pureval
- Preceded by: Christopher Smitherman

Member of the Cincinnati City Council
- Incumbent
- Assumed office March 2020
- Preceded by: Tamaya Dennard

Personal details
- Born: Jean–Michelle Lemon Cincinnati, Ohio, U.S.
- Party: Democratic
- Spouse: Eric Kearney
- Children: 2
- Education: Dartmouth College (BA); Harvard University (MA); Harvard Law School (J.D.)

Jan-Michelle Lemon Kearney is an American businesswoman, attorney, and politician currently serving as Vice Mayor of Cincinnati, a position she has held since January 2022. A Democrat, she has been a member of the Cincinnati City Council since March 2020. She co-founded and has run KGL Media Group, Inc. dba Sesh Communications, the publisher of The Cincinnati Herald.

== Early life and education ==
Kearney grew up in the Avondale neighborhood of Cincinnati. She is the daughter of Luther J. Lemon (who worked as a family physician) and Elizabeth M. Lemon who worked as a teacher in Cincinnati Public Schools. Kearney was educated in the Cincinnati Public Schools, She attended elementary school at Rockdale Elementary School, and high school at Walnut Hills High School.

Kearney received three degrees from two Ivy League universities in her post-secondary education. She first graduated college cum laude with an undergrad degree from Dartmouth College. During her time as a Dartmouth student, she participated in an student exchange program, completing a portion of her degree at Talladega College (an HBCU that her father had graduated from). Kearney next received two degrees from Harvard University. She first received a master's degree in counseling and consulting psychology from Harvard. She next attended Harvard Law School, where she graduated with a juris doctor. At Harvard Law School, she was classmates and acquaintances with Barack Obama (who would years later, in 2008, be elected U.S. President). Kearney was elected first class marshal of her law school graduating class, and delivered the commencement speech at their graduation ceremony.

== Career in law, news publishing, and broadcast media ==
Kearney practiced as a lawyer at the Taft Stettinius & Hollister firm before departing and becoming an independent attorney.

Around the time she became an independent attorney, she also established the multimedia publishing company KGL Media Group, Inc. dba Sesh Communications. As of 2025, the company owns several newspapers and magazines, including The Cincinnati Herald, The Dayton Defender, The North Kentucky Herald, and seshPRIME Magazine. The Cincinnati Herald has a large black readership. Her role as publisher of the newspaper aided Kearney in establishing herself as an influential individual within Cincinnati's African American community and the city's overall politics. She was a major player in Cincinnati politics decades before becoming a political officeholder in 2020.

Kearney was also previously a co-host on the WLWT programs "Issues" and "Let’s Talk Cincinnati". She helped found the Greater Cincinnati Association of Black Journalists (aa local chapter of the National Association of Black Journalists), and co-chaired the National Newspaper Publishers Association's 2019 national convention.

== Cincinnati City Council ==
Since March 2020, Kearney (a member of the Democratic Party) has served as a member of the Cincinnati City Council. She first joined after being appointed to fill a seat vacated by Tamaya Dennard after Dennard's federal arrest for charges of bribery (charges which ultimately resulted in a conviction).

Kearney won re-election in November 2021, receiving the most votes of any city council candidate on a crowded race for nine at-large seats. She received 28,672 votes, 1,676 more than the second-place candidate, Greg Landsman (a Democrat who had been on the council since 2017). This was regarded to have been a surprise, as Landsman's longer incumbency had led many to expect him to receive the more vote than Kearney.

=== Vice mayoralty (2022–present) ===
In November 2021, Aftab Pureval (the mayor-elect) announced that he would be appointing Kearney to serve as Vice Mayor at the start of his term. The city's vice mayor (appointed by a mayor) substitutes in fulfilling mayoral duties when a mayor cannot perform them, including when a mayor is out of town or incapacitated. Pureval and Kearney were seen as ideologically well-aligned with one another.

In 2022, Purevel re-appointed Kearney to continue a second year as vice mayor.

Kearney was re-elected to the council in 2023, again placing first among candidates in the at-large election.

In October 2024, Kearney disclosed that she would not be a candidate for mayor in 2025. She announced she was instead seeking another term on the council. She was re-elected to the council for a third term, once again placing first among candidates in the at-large election.

== Other work ==
Kearney has served on the board of the Cincinnati Zoo and Botanical Garden.

== Personal life ==
Kearney is married to Eric Kearney, a former member of the Ohio Senate. They have two children.
