= Killing of Casey Goodson =

2020 police shooting in Columbus, Ohio

- Location: Columbus, Ohio
- Date: December 4, 2020; 5 years ago
- Attack type: Shooting by law enforcement
- Victim: Casey Goodson
- Perpetrator: Jason Meade
- Convictions: Reckless homicide

On December 4, 2020, Casey Goodson, a 23-year-old African American man, was shot and killed by Jason Meade, a deputy with the Franklin County Sheriff's Office, in Columbus, Ohio. Meade, who was working with a U.S. Marshals Service task force, shot Goodson six times as he entered his grandmother's home. Meade testified that he believed Goodson had waved a gun at him as they drove by each other, leading him to pursue Goodson. Prosecutors said Goodson was holding Subway sandwiches when he was killed, and that his handgun was in a holder under his belt with the safety turned on. Meade was charged with murder. His first trial ended in a mistrial, but in his second he was convicted of reckless homicide.

Goodson was one of two Black men killed by law enforcement in Columbus in December 2020, the other being Andre Hill on December 22.

== People involved ==
Casey Goodson was a 23-year-old man. He was a concealed carry permit holder and had no criminal history.

Michael Jason Meade (also referred to as Jason Meade) was a sheriff's deputy with the Franklin County Sheriff's Office and a Baptist pastor. He was a member of a U.S. Marshals Service task force, but was not working as a federal agent at the time. He retired from the sheriff's office in 2021.

== Incident ==
The shooting occurred on December 4, 2020. Meade and other members of the Marshals task force had just finished an unsuccessful search for a fugitive. Goodson was not the subject of the search. Meade said that he pursued Goodson after he waved a gun at him as Goodson drove by. A witness said he saw Goodson dancing and singing in his truck before the shooting. The pursuit ended at Goodson's grandmother's home, where Meade shot him as he attempted to enter. Meade testified that he saw a gun in Goodson's hand, though two witnesses did not report seeing it. Prosecutors said that when Goodson was shot, he was holding Subway sandwiches and his keys, and was listening to music through earbuds.

The Franklin County Sheriff's Office did not have body-cameras, and there is no known footage of the shooting.

An autopsy conducted by the Franklin County Coroner found Goodson was shot six times from behind. His death was ruled a homicide.

== Legal proceedings ==
=== Criminal ===
Meade was indicted on two counts of murder and one count of reckless homicide in December 2021. His first trial ended with a mistrial in December 2024.

On May 7, 2026, Meade was convicted of reckless homicide. However, jurors were unable to reach a verdict on murder, and a mistrial was declared for that charge. Goodson's family's attorney said the jury was split 10-2 in favor of conviction. Meade's sentencing for reckless homicide was set for June 16, 2026.

=== Civil ===
Goodson's family settled a civil claim for $7 million in July 2024.

== See also ==
- 2020–2022 United States racial unrest
- George Floyd protests in Columbus, Ohio
- Killing of Donovan Lewis
- List of killings by law enforcement officers in the United States, December 2020
