= Killing of Donovan Lewis =

August 2022 event in the United States

- Date: August 30, 2022
- Location: Columbus, Ohio
- Type: Shooting
- Participants: Ricky Anderson
- Deaths: Donovan Lewis

On August 30, 2022, 20-year-old biracial Black man Donovan Lewis (born May 14, 2002) was shot and killed by Officer Ricky Anderson of the Columbus Division of Police (CDP) in the Hilltop neighborhood of Columbus, Ohio as officers served a warrant at his apartment. Police were serving a warrant against Lewis for assault, improper handling of a firearm, and domestic violence against his pregnant girlfriend. After officers detained two men at the apartment, police opened the door to Lewis's bedroom, after which point Anderson fired a single shot at Lewis who was laying in bed.

== Incident ==
At about 2:00 AM on August 30, 2022, Columbus Police served a warrant at Lewis's apartment in the Hilltop neighborhood for improperly handling a firearm, assault, and domestic violence. Officers knocked on the front door for eight to ten minutes before a resident of the apartment opened the door. Police detained him and another resident. Police released a canine unit which walked into the kitchen before approaching and barking at Lewis's bedroom door. Officer Ricky Anderson, a 30-year veteran of the department, opened the bedroom door and almost immediately fired once, hitting Lewis. Police claim Lewis was holding a vape pen in his hands but it is not visible in the recording. Lewis was then handcuffed by Officers Knox and Dodrill, who were present at the scene. Police carried him outside the apartment, where they performed CPR. Lewis was transported to a hospital and later pronounced dead.

== Investigation and trial ==
Body camera footage of the shooting was released the same day as the shooting, along with footage of two other non-fatal Columbus Police shootings. In August 2022, the Ohio Bureau of Criminal Investigation stated that they were investigating the shooting.

On October 25, 2022, the Franklin County Coroner's Office ruled Lewis' death a homicide.

On March 3, 2023, Anderson retired from the CDP "in bad standing" due to the ongoing investigations into Lewis's death.

On August 4, 2023, Anderson was indicted on charges of reckless homicide and murder. The case was expected to go to trial in May 2025, but was postponed to a later date. On September 2, 2026, Anderson pleaded guilty to reckless homicide in exchange for having murder charges dropped. He was sentenced to three years of probation.

== Reaction ==
On September 2, protests were held outside the Columbus Division of Police Headquarters and Ohio State University's Ohio Union.

Lewis's family was represented by attorney Rex Elliott of Cooper Elliott Personal Injury Lawyers, as well as Wright & Schulte Law Firm. A press conference was held at a downtown Columbus hotel on September 1. Lewis' family sued Anderson and four other officers for $25,000. Rex Elliott highlighted that the department was "disproportionally targeting" specific resident groups. The lawsuit accused Anderson of battery, breach of duty, intentional infliction of emotional distress, failure to render aid, and violation of Constitutional rights.

The Brady Campaign and the NAACP released statements condemning the shooting.

On September 7, the Columbus Division of Police Chief Elaine Bryant announced the department would no longer execute pre-planned arrest warrants at private homes for misdemeanor offenses unless it is approved by a lieutenant or someone with a higher authority. The change does not apply to SWAT or task force personnel.

== See also ==
- List of unarmed African Americans killed by law enforcement officers in the United States
- 2020–2022 United States racial unrest
- Killing of Casey Goodson
- Murder of Andre Hill
- List of killings by law enforcement officers in the United States, August 2022
