= Ohio House Bill 249 =

Proposed Ohio law

Indecent Exposure Modernization Act

Ohio General Assembly
- Long title: To amend sections 2907.09, 2907.39, and 4301.25 of the Revised Code to enact the Indecent Exposure Modernization Act.
- Territorial extent: Ohio
- Considered by: Ohio House of Representatives
- Introduced by: Angela King and Josh Williams
- Introduced: April 29, 2025

Summary
- Restricts adult cabaret performances to adult-only locations and expands the scope of what is considered an adult cabaret performance.
- Status: Pending

Ohio House Bill 249 (HB 249), also known as the Indecent Exposure Modernization Act, is a proposed law in the US state of Ohio that would restrict cabaret to adult locations only and would consider any public performer expressing a gender identity differing from their biological sex as a cabaret performer. It is generally seen as a ban on public drag performances. It is identical to House Bill 245, a failed 2024 bill.

== Provisions ==
House Bill 249 would restrict cabaret performers to only being allowed to perform in adult spaces. It includes a specific provision that considers public performers who express a gender identity differing from their biological sex as adult cabaret, which would include drag performers. It defines allowed adult spaces which include nightclubs, certain restaurants, and other spaces which are restricted to adults.

Besides performers expressing a different gender identity from their sex, the bill would similarly restrict strippers, go-go dancers, and topless dancers to adult spaces as well. It would be considered a first-degree misdemeanor if such a performance took place with a minor present and a fourth-degree felony if it is an obscene performance with minors under thirteen years old present.

== Reactions ==
=== Support ===
The main sponsors of the bill, Angela King and Josh Williams, as well as 42 other Republican members of the Ohio House of Representatives, all endorsed House Bill 249.

=== Opposition ===
The ACLU of Ohio and Stonewall Columbus publicly opposed House Bill 249, considering it a broad attack on transgender and gender non-conforming people. The executive director of Equality Ohio referred to it as censorship.

== See also ==
- Drag panic
- LGBTQ rights in Ohio
- Tennessee Adult Entertainment Act
