= 2024 in Ohio =

- Decades: 2000s; 2010s; 2020s
- See also: History of Ohio; Historical outline of Ohio; List of years in Ohio; 2024 in the United States

The following is a list of events of the year 2024 in Ohio.

== Incumbents ==
=== State government ===
- Governor: Mike DeWine (R)
- Secretary of State: Frank LaRose (R)
- Attorney General: Dave Yost (R)
- Treasurer of State: Robert Sprague (R)

== Events ==
- March 13–15 – A significant early spring tornado outbreak occurred throughout the Midwestern and Northeastern United States, with the most significant impacts occurring in Indiana and Ohio. The outbreak produced 34 tornadoes and caused $5.9 billion (2024 USD) in damage. On March 14, an intense EF3 tornado struck the villages of Lakeview and Russells Point in Logan County, where it killed 3 people and injured 27 others. At least 45% of Lakeview was damaged or destroyed by the tornado.
- March 19 –
  - 2024 Democratic Party presidential primaries: The Democratic Party holds presidential nominating contests in Ohio.
  - 2024 Republican Party presidential primaries: The Republican Party holds presidential nominating contests in Ohio.
- May 28 – Realty Building explosion: One person is killed and seven others are injured in a natural gas explosion at an apartment building in Youngstown.
- June 2 – A mass shooting in Akron kills a 27-year-old man and wounds 24 people.
- July 1 – A mass shooting in Cincinnati, kills three people and injures two others. An adult suspect has been arrested.
- July 15 – Presumptive Republican nominee Donald Trump selects Ohio senator J. D. Vance as his vice-presidential running mate.
- October 24 – Four people, including the perpetrator, are killed in a mass stabbing in Cincinnati.
- November 5 – 2024 United States presidential election in Ohio
- November 17 - A small group of Neo-Nazis in Columbus parade around the city. The march gained national attention.
- December 5 - Ohio Beta Omega, a fraternity chapter of Alpha Tau Omega in the Ohio State University, is suspended and under investigation for hazing.

== See also ==
- 2024 in the United States
