= List of killings by law enforcement officers in the United States, December 2020 =

This is a list of people reported killed by non-military law enforcement officers in the United States in December 2020, whether in the line of duty or not, and regardless of reason or method. The listing documents the occurrence of a death, making no implications regarding wrongdoing or justification on the part of the person killed or officer involved. Killings are arranged by date of the incident that caused death. Different death dates, if known, are noted in the description. The table below lists 101 people.

== December 2020 ==
Date	Name (age) of deceased	Race	State (city)	Description
2020-12-31	Rodolfo Caraballo Moreno	Unknown	Florida (Miami)	Police were called after reports of gunshots on New Year's Eve. Relatives say that police shot Caraballo Moreno several times with a rifle. Relatives also said that he was holding two guns, but may have thought he was defending himself.
2020-12-31	David Randall Shephard (39)	White	Beaumont, TX	
2020-12-31	Jeffrey L. Marvin (63)	Unknown race	Unincorporated, IN	
2020-12-30	Christian Hall (19)	Asian	Pennsylvania (Monroe County)	Christian Hall was shot and killed by law enforcement while standing on an overpass on Interstate 80. Police responded to a call of a mental health crisis, and he was suspected to be suicidal. His relatives and viewers on the internet expressed that they felt the shooting was an inappropriate response by Law Enforcement.
2020-12-30	Peter K. England (21)	Native Hawaiian and Pacific Islander	Ammon, ID	
2020-12-30	Jason Williams (37)	White	Wichita, KS	
2020-12-30	Dolal Idd (23)	African-American	Minnesota (Minneapolis)	A Community Response Team of Minneapolis Police stopped a vehicle at the Holiday Gas Station in the Powderhorn Park neighborhood of Minneapolis. According to a police spokesperson, the officers believed a felony suspect, an adult male, was in the vehicle along with an adult woman. The police had their body cameras on, and the felony suspect in the vehicle exchanged shots with the officers and was killed. The woman was uninjured. A crowd of activists began gathering within the hour after the shooting. The shooting was the first police killing in Minneapolis since the murder of George Floyd in May, and it happened less than 1 mile (1.6 km) from the site where it occurred. On December 31, the Minneapolis Police released the footage from the body cams, which showed three police vehicles attempting to stop a car in the gas station parking lot. The driver attempted to ram through the police vehicles, which then blocked it in. Then the glass of the driver side window appears to break outward as shots are heard.
2020-12-29	Trevor Seever (29)	White	California (Modesto)	An unarmed man was shot and killed by police after being told to put his hands up. The officer entered the scene and shot Seever, then made him sit on the ground with his hands up. Seever kept his hands raised but then put his hand on his chest to stop the bleeding to which Seever was shot multiple more times, fatally. Body camera footage has been released by Modesto Police Department. Seever's is heard saying, “I can’t breathe!” in the video. On March 18, 2021, Modesto Officer Joseph Lamantia was fired, arrested, and charged with voluntary manslaughter.
2020-12-29	Jaquan Haynes (18)	Black	Atlanta, GA	
2020-12-29	Jason Cooper (28)	Black	Charleston, SC	
2020-12-29	Shyheed Robert Boyd (21)	Black	Highland, CA	
2020-12-29	Samuel Lorenzo (18)	Hispanic	Brooklyn, NY	
2020-12-28	Jordan Crawford (30)	White	Arizona (Phoenix)	At his ex-girlfriend’s house, Crawford told police that he had a gun, then acted as if he were pulling the weapon, according to police body cam footage.
2020-12-28	Alaina Burns (31)	Unknown race	Warrenton, OR	
2020-12-28	Name Withheld	Unknown race	Holyoke, CO	
2020-12-28	Helen Jones (47)	Black	Phoenix, AZ	
2020-12-28	Name Withheld (33)	Unknown race	Hesperia, CA	
2020-12-28	Bryan Cruz-Soto (28)	Hispanic	Brockton, MA	
2020-12-28	Caillen Paoakea Gentzler (45)	Native Hawaiian or Pacific Islander	Kaneohe, HI	
2020-12-28	Larry Hamm (47)	Black	Denver, CO	
2020-12-27	Marquavious Rashod Parks (26)	Black	Davisboro, GA	
2020-12-27	Cole Blevins (40)	White	Lewiston, ID	
2020-12-26	Shamar Ogman (30)	Black	Connecticut (Hartford)	Police were called after reports of a man holding two guns in the middle of a street. Several officers responded, and one shot the man after he allegedly pointed an assault rifle at the officers.
2020-12-26	Aliana Burns (31)	Black	Oregon (Astoria)	Bruns was burglarizing a home, and was killed by a State Trooper when she "brandished a gun in an officer's direction".
2020-12-25	Sheikh Mustafa Davis (20)	Black	Midway, GA	
2020-12-25	Jesus Perez (43)	Hispanic	Philadelphia, PA	
2020-12-25	John Moreno (32)	Hispanic	Rio Rico, AZ	
2020-12-25	Isaac Frazier (31)	Black	Houston, TX	
2020-12-24	Michael B. Joyner (39)	White	Oakland, TN	
2020-12-24	Tara Rae Liubakka (39)	White	Redding, CA	
2020-12-23	Angelo Quinto (30)	Asian	California (Antioch)	Quinto's family called police to his home after he had an episode of paranoia. When police arrived, several officers restrained him, with one officer putting his knee on Quinto's neck. Quinto fell into unconsciousness and died at a hospital three days later.
2020-12-23	Mark Clermont (45)	White	Dalton, NH	
2020-12-22	Christopher Cuevas (45)	Hispanic	Glendale, AZ	
2020-12-22	Andre Maurice Hill (47)	Black	Ohio (Columbus)	Columbus Mayor Andrew Ginther dismissed police officer Adam Coy after the white officer, who has a history of complaints, shot and killed Andre Hill inside a home garage as Hill showed his phone. Coy reportedly failed to activate his body camera and to initiate life-saving measures in timely fashion. The killing followed weeks of protest over the police killing of Casey Goodson, earlier the same month, also in Columbus.
2020-12-22	Monica Goods (11)	Black	New York (Ulster)	New York State Trooper Christopher Baldner pursued Tristin Goods' vehicle after he allegedly fled a traffic stop for speeding. According to Goods, the father of the victim, the trooper "pulled him and his family over, maced them, and then rammed their car twice at high speed before the crash that took his daughter’s life." Goods also stated that Baldner screamed at him and didn't warn the family before using pepper spray. Fearing for the safety of his family, Goods instinctively drove off, and Baldner gave chase. After the Goods' vehicle was hit by Baldner twice, Monica Goods was ejected from her father's SUV and died at the scene. In the aftermath of the crash, Tristin Goods tried to leave the SUV to rescue Monica, but Baldner pulled a gun on him. Later, troopers interviewed Tristina, Monica's surviving 12-year-old sister, for four straight hours without a parent present.
2020-12-22	Joseph Tanner Casten (19)	White	Joliet, IL	
2020-12-21	Larry Taylor (39)	Black	Mobile, AL	
2020-12-21	Paul Peraza (50)	Hispanic	Wichita, KS	
2020-12-20	William A. Riley-Jennings (34)	White	Anchorage, AK	
2020-12-19	Moises Arreola	Hispanic	Lennox, CA	
2020-12-18	Daniel Russell (38)	White	Oshtemo Township, MI	
2020-12-18	Leonel Salinas (34)	Hispanic	Nampa, ID	
2020-12-18	Jacob E. McClure (41)	White	Jefferson, ME	
2020-12-18	Johnathan George Brown	White	Bakersfield, CA	
2020-12-18	Name Withheld	Unknown race	Lucerne Valley, CA	
2020-12-17	Johnny Lorenzo Bolton (49)	Black	Georgia (Smyrna)	Bolton was shot and killed by police during a no-knock warrant. When Bolton stood up, a deputy shot him twice. A jury recommended charges against the deputy who shot Bolton.
2020-12-17	Nicholas Ellingson (37)	Unknown race	Auburn, WA	
2020-12-17	Andrew Mansilla (25)	Hispanic	Daytona Beach, FL	
2020-12-17	Joshua Hoffpauir (33)	White	Sevierville, TN	
2020-12-15	Ernie Serrano (33)	Native American	California (Jurupa Valley)	Serrano was held down by several sheriff's deputies in a Jurupa Valley grocery store. Deputies claim Serrano tried to grab a security guard's gun during the incident. The Riverside County sheriff said an initial autopsy found Serrano had methamphetamine, marijuana and other drugs in his system. Ernie's family says that his death was caused by asphyxia due to the position he was in, disallowing him to breathe, with the drugs making breathing even more difficult, leading him to die of oxygen starvation.
2020-12-16	Jeremy Maurice Daniels (29)	Black	Concord Mills, NC	
2020-12-16	Adam Robertson (34)	White	Orlando, FL	
2020-12-16	Benjamin Marley Manley aka Christopher Reeves (36)	White	Deming, NM	
2020-12-15	David John Donelli (42)	White	Greenfield, IN	
2020-12-15	Reno E. Casanova (25)	Hispanic	Kennewick, WA	
2020-12-15	Julian Rose	Native American	Glenpool, OK	
2020-12-15	Name Withheld (85)	White	Pearland, TX	
2020-12-14	Michael Anthony Dilbeck	White	Houston, TX	
2020-12-13	Matthew T. Melzoni	Unknown race	Huntington, IN	
2020-12-13	Luis Vasquez (52)	White/Latino	New York (New York City)	A man was fatally shot by police after he opened fire near a crowd outside the Cathedral of Saint John the Divine at the end of a Christmas choral concert. He was shooting in the air and at police, and was carrying a backpack which contained rope, a can of gasoline, multiple knives, and a bible, as well as multiple handguns and cartridges. He was killed after being shot in the head, and had been shouting 'Kill me, kill me!'.
2020-12-13	Jordan Zenka	Unknown	California (Sacramento)	A man crashed his car into a store and started threatening shoppers. He stabbed himself, and got into a standoff with officers. He had critically injured himself with the knife, was acting erratically, and injured three people, but it is unknown if they were injured by the knife or the vehicle. He was shot and killed by two policemen, and the entire store was evacuated. Police had apparently tried to use less-than-lethal tactics, but the situation escalated.
2020-12-13	Robert Joseph Evans (29)	White	Utah (Farmington)	Evans was shot and killed by Utah Highway Patrol officers after he rammed a patrol car, got out, and 'started advancing aggressively towards officers'. It is reported that the car may have been stolen, and that 'he was armed', but the weapon has not been specified by UHP. Police initiated life saving measures, which failed.
2020-12-11	Name Withheld (35)	Unknown race	Trout Creek, MT	
2020-12-11	Charles E. Jones (36)	Black	Houston, TX	
2020-12-11	Bennie Edwards (60)	Black	Oklahoma (Oklahoma City)	A merchant called 911 because Edwards was causing a disturbance. When an officer arrived, Edwards approached him with a knife. Additional police were called, and Edwards was instructed multiple time to drop his knife, and pepper spray and a taser were used. Edwards continued to be combative, and was shot. Edwards' family said he suffered mental illness and was scared.
2020-12-10	Whitney J. Crawley (23)	Unknown race	Gary, IN	
2020-12-10	Kurtis Kay Frevert (79)	White	Montclair, VA	
2020-12-10	Eric Drake Feenstra (47)	White	Bivins, TX	
2020-12-10	Evelio Rivera (37)	Hispanic	Rehoboth Beach, DE	
2020-12-10	Earl Robert Caperton (55)	White	Middleway, WV	
2020-12-10	Augustin “Gus” Mormann (31)	White	Manchester, IA	
2020-12-10	Thomas Reeder III (44)	Black	Michigan (Flint)	Reeder was shot and killed by police after a standoff; he was the main suspect and perpetrator in the December 7 fatal shooting of 30-year-old Brittney N. Chatman. Police tried to enter his house after getting a warrant for his arrest in her murder, but he fired at them and a shootout ensued, which ended his death by shooting.
2020-12-09	Joshua Feast (22)	Black	La Marque, TX	
2020-12-09	Kenneth Dale Miller (47)	White	Oxford, MS	
2020-12-09	Joseph R. Crawford (23)	Black	Fort Atkinson, WI	
2020-12-08	Nathaniel Sironen (40)	White	Las Vegas, NV	
2020-12-08	Brad Tyler Masters (27)	White	Gates, OR	
2020-12-08	Dylan Ray Scott (27)	White	Riverview, FL	
2020-12-07	Amy Ambercrombie (26)	Unknown	Texas (Conroe)	Amy Ambercrombie, 26, was accidentally struck and killed by a Montgomery County Patrol car. She had been wearing all black and was walking in the middle of the highway.
2020-12-06	Christian Juarez (28)	Hispanic	Rowland Heights, CA	
2020-12-06	Mark Brewer (28)	Black	St. Louis, MO	
2020-12-06	Donald Edwin Saunders (37)	Black	Dayton, OH	
2020-12-05	Kwamaine O'Neal (47)	Black	Toledo, OH	
2020-12-05	Oldrich Fejfar	Unknown race	Savannah, GA	
2020-12-05	Estavon Dominic Elioff (19)	Hispanic	Mountain Iron, MN	
2020-12-05	Name Withheld (30)	Unknown race	Mesquite, TX	
2020-12-05	Herschel Turner Jr. (54)	Black	Missouri (Moline Acres)	An officer from Bellefontaine Neighbors pursued a stolen vehicle driving fifty miles over the speed limit without his emergency lights on. The officer struck Turner, an officer from Moline Acres, who was standing outside his vehicle while helping with a vehicle stop. The pursuing officer was charged with involuntary manslaughter in 2022.
2020-12-04	Casey Goodson (23)	Black	Ohio (Columbus)	Police had finished an unsuccessful search for a fugitive (not Goodson) when Goodson supposedly "drove by and waved a gun" at an officer. The off duty officer (Jason Meade) followed Goodson to his home. According to the officer, he commanded Goodson to drop his gun, and when Goodson did not comply, he was shot five times in the back and buttocks outside his home. Police said a gun was recovered from the scene. Goodson's family said he was holding a sandwich, not a gun. He was licensed to carry a gun. The house keys were in the door of the home, Goodson was shot through the door, and the sandwiches were confirmed at the scene. In December 2021 the deputy who shot Goodson was charged with murder.
2020-12-04	Andre K. Sterling (35)	Black	Bronx, NY	
2020-12-04	Leonard Francis Kieren (60)	White	Buckeye, AZ	
2020-12-04	Randy Ward (34)	White	Prichard, WV	
2020-12-04	Nancy King (70)	Unknown race	Spokane, WA	
2020-12-03	Maurice Jackson (42)	Black	Phoenix, AZ	
2020-12-03	Larry Eugene Boyd (43)	Unknown race	East Nashville, TN	
2020-12-03	Craig Steven Wright (60)	White	Mansfield, OH	
2020-12-03	Tyrone Washington (39)	Black	Little Rock, AR	
2020-12-02	Dolores Hernandez (62)	White/Latino	California (Redding)	Police were called after Hernandez allegedly yelled at store patrons at Discovery Village shopping center. When police arrived, they say that Hernandez hit an officer with a car and pinned him under the front tire, leading one of the officers to shoot.
2020-12-02	Dominique Harris (20)	Black	St. Petersburg, FL	
2020-12-01	James David Hawley (47)	Black	Pineville, LA	
2020-12-01	Kevin Fox (28)	Black	Detroit, MI	
2020-12-01	Ethan Tyler Calton (28)	White	Rutherfordton, NC	

== See also ==
- Death in custody § United States
- Henry A. Wallace Police Crime Public Database
- List of cases of police brutality
- List of countries with annual rates and counts for killings by law enforcement officers
- List of law enforcement officers killed in the line of duty in the United States
- List of law enforcement officers convicted for an on-duty killing in the United States
- List of shootings by US immigration agents
- List of police reforms related to the George Floyd protests
- List of unarmed African Americans killed by law enforcement officers in the United States
- Lists of killings by law enforcement officers
- Police brutality in the United States
- Police misconduct § United States
- Police riot § United States
- Police use of deadly force in the United States
