= 2023 Clark County, Ohio school bus crash =

2023 Clark County school bus crash
- Location of the crash in Ohio

Details
- Date: August 22, 2023; 3 years ago
- Location: Clark County, Ohio
- Coordinates: 39.9868°N 83.8823°W
- Incident type: School bus crash
- Cause: Failure to maintain lane.

Statistics
- Bus: School bus
- Passengers: 53
- Deaths: 1
- Injured: 26, including 23 hospitalizations

On the morning of August 22, 2023, a school bus in Clark County, Ohio overturned off the side of the road, after being struck by a passenger van that crossed the centerline. One student died as a result of the collision, and 26 others were injured.

== Incident ==
On the morning of Tuesday, August 22, 2023, at approximately 8:15 am, a Northwestern Local Schools school bus transporting 52 elementary aged students on the first day of school was traveling westbound on Ohio State Route 41 near Lawrenceville. The driver of an eastbound Honda Odyssey, 36-year old Hermanio Joseph, crossed the centerline on the two-lane road, striking the driver side of the bus. The van scraped along the side of the bus until it made contact with the rear wheel, which caused the axle to break. This caused the bus to overturn into a culvert, just north of the impact.

First responders received 911 calls reporting the incident at approximately 8:16 am, and first responders began arriving at the scene of the accident 3 minutes after receiving the call. Aiden Clark, an 11-year-old boy was ejected from the bus, and died on the scene as a result, and was the only death attributed to the accident. Of the remaining 51 students on the bus, 13 were transported to local area hospitals by ambulance, and 10 by personal means. The driver of the school bus suffered minor injuries, and was not transported to the hospital. Both the driver of the van, Joseph, and a passenger inside the van were transported to Springfield Regional Medical Center with non-life-threatening injuries. Two helicopters that had been called in were canceled.

== Aftermath ==
Shortly after the accident, first responders struggled with securing the scene. Bystanders were "attempting to overturn the bus", and parents began arriving on the scene and attempting to take their children before they were cleared by medical personnel. Despite the school district's emergency operation plan (EOP) specifying that reunification efforts be made at a nearby church, the school directed students to be transported to the nearby fire station for reunification, causing further confusion. As a result, "the ensuing congestion interfered with the station’s ability to respond to other calls."

The school district canceled school the following day, and made grief counselors at local schools available students, staff, and community. The school district also canceled school the following Monday so that members of the community could attend the memorial service that was held for Aiden Clark.

It was later found that Joseph, a legal Haitian immigrant, did not have a valid Ohio Driver's license at the time of the accident. Politicians such as former president Donald Trump, senator JD Vance, and Ohio attorney general Dave Yost invoked the incident while advocating for their anti-immigration stances and policies. Nathan Clark, Aidan Clark's father, denounced the use of his son's death for political gain at a Springfield, Ohio town hall meeting saying "This needs to stop now” “They can vomit all the hate they want about illegal immigrants, the border crisis and even untrue claims about fluffy pets being ravaged and eaten by community members. However, they are not allowed, nor have they ever been allowed, to mention Aiden Clark from Springfield, Ohio. I will listen to them one more time to hear their apologies."

== Investigation and legal proceedings ==
During court, inward and outward facing footage of the accident was shown, showing the van crossing the center line and striking the bus. Joseph testified that he attempted to avoid the collision, but prosecutors provided data from the Ohio State Highway Patrol investigation showing he was speeding and did not brake before striking the bus. Nathan Clark, Aidan Clark's father, provided an impact statement during the proceedings. Joseph was convicted May 1, 2024, of first-degree felony involuntary manslaughter and fourth-degree felony vehicular homicide. He was sentenced to 9 to 13.5 years in prison, with 2 to 5 years of post-release control after serving the time.
