= 2025 Cincinnati mayoral election =

Local election in Ohio, US

- November 4, 2025
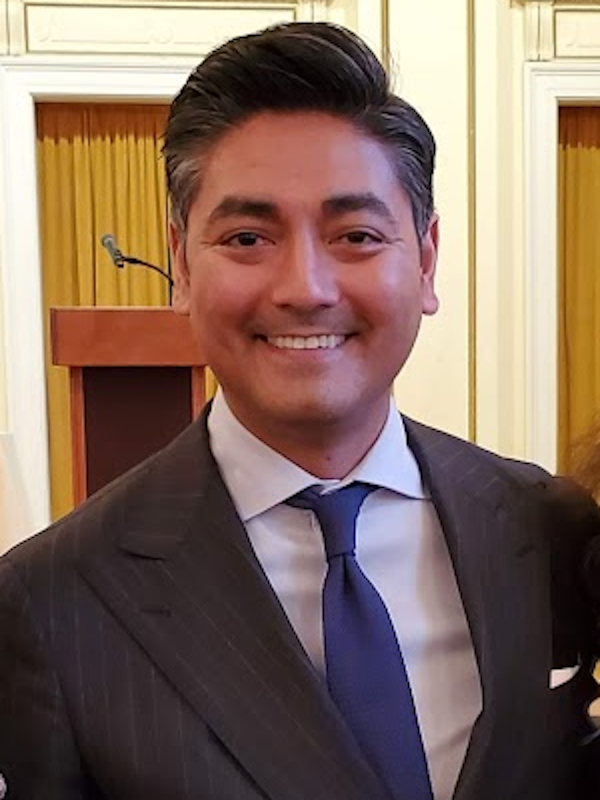

Candidate	Aftab Pureval	Cory Bowman
Popular vote	52,697	14,579
Percentage	78.31%	21.66%
- Precinct results Pureval: 50–60% 60–70% 70–80% 80–90% >90% Bowman: 50–60% 60–70%
Mayor before election
Aftab Pureval
Democratic
Elected mayor
Aftab Pureval
Democratic

The 2025 Cincinnati mayoral election took place on November 4, 2025, with a primary election held on May 6, 2025. At the primary election, the two highest-placing candidates advanced to the general election. Municipal elections in Cincinnati are officially nonpartisan.

Incumbent mayor Aftab Pureval won re-election to a second term in office against Cory Bowman.

== Primary election ==
=== Candidates ===
==== Advanced to general election ====
- Cory Bowman, coffee shop owner and half-brother of Vice President JD Vance (party preference: Republican)
- Aftab Pureval, incumbent mayor (party preference: Democratic)

==== Eliminated in primary ====
- Brian Frank, procurement professional (party preference: Republican)

==== Declined ====
- Jan-Michele Kearney, vice mayor (party preference: Democratic)

=== Endorsements ===
Cory Bowman

Federal officials

- JD Vance, vice president of the United States (2025–present) and former U.S. senator from Ohio (2023–2025) (candidate's half-brother)
Aftab Pureval

Organizations

- Ohio Environmental Council Action Fund

=== Results ===
2025 Cincinnati mayoral primary election
Candidate	Votes	%
Aftab Pureval (incumbent)	18,747	82.57%
Cory Bowman	2,926	12.89%
Brian Frank	1,031	4.54%
Total votes	22,704	100.00

== General election ==
=== Endorsements ===
Cory Bowman

Party chapters

- Hamilton County Republican Party

Labor unions

- Cincinnati Fraternal Order of Police, Queen City Lodge No. 69
Aftab Pureval

Party chapters

- Hamilton County Democratic Party

=== Results ===
2025 Cincinnati mayoral election
Candidate	Votes	%
Aftab Pureval (incumbent)	52,697	78.31%
Cory Bowman	14,579	21.66%
Write-in	20	0.03%
Total votes	67,296	100.00
