= Murder of Andre Hill =

2020 police shooting in Columbus, Ohio

- Location: 40.02582°N 83.042213°W; Columbus, Ohio
- Date: December 22, 2020; 5 years ago c. 1:49 – 1:51 a.m. (EST)
- Attack type: Shooting by law enforcement, police brutality
- Victim: Andre Hill
- Perpetrator: Adam Coy
- Convictions: Murder; Felonious assault; Reckless homicide
- Sentence: 15 years to life in prison

On December 22, 2020, Andre Hill, a 47-year-old African American man, was shot and killed by Adam Coy, a police officer of the Columbus Division of Police in Columbus, Ohio. Coy had been called to the neighborhood in response to a non-emergency call from a neighbor who reportedly witnessed someone sit in an SUV and turn the car on and off. Hill was leaving a friend's house when Coy confronted and shot him. Hill was unarmed, and was holding a smartphone. Coy was fired from the Columbus Police less than a week later.

The shooting was the second killing by police in Columbus in December 2020, following the shooting of Casey Goodson on December 4 by a Franklin County Sheriff's deputy. Coy's trial would begin in October 2024. On November 4, 2024, Coy was found guilty in the killing. On July 28, 2025, Coy was sentenced to 15 years to life in prison.

== People involved ==
Andre Maurice Hill (also identified as Andre' Hill) was a 47-year-old African American man. He had one daughter and a granddaughter. Hill was a supporter of Black Lives Matter (BLM) and was wearing a BLM shirt when he was killed.

Adam Coy was a police officer in the Columbus Division of Police. Following the shooting, Coy was fired. Coy had been an officer with CPD for 19 years. During his career, 90 citizen complaints had been filed against Coy, and his police personnel file reflected a number of incidents, going back at least nine years, in which Coy had reacted inappropriately while under stress. He had received "documented constructive counseling" for discourtesy toward citizens (such as swearing), irresponsible driving, smoking while on duty, and failure to use police-car microphones.

In October 2012, the division, after an internal investigation and hearing, found that Coy had used excessive force after he slammed a suspected drunk driver's head four times against the hood of a police car, an incident captured on dashboard camera. While the police chief and city public safety director recommended that Coy receive a 200-hour suspension, a grievance filed by the local Fraternal Order of Police resulted in the suspension being reduced to 160 hours. The incident also resulted in the City of Columbus paying $45,000 in a settlement.

== Incident ==
Coy and another officer, Amy Detweiler, responded to a non-emergency call around 1:49 AM about a car repeatedly turning on and off near 1000 Oberlin Drive. It is unclear if this car had anything to do with Hill. Around the same time Coy and Detweiler arrived at the scene, Hill was leaving a friend's house while holding an illuminated smartphone in his left hand. Bodycam footage shows Coy and Hill walking toward each other. Coy shot Hill several times, as he yelled at him to show his hands.

Hill was shot three times in the right leg and once in the chest. Coy did not turn on his body-worn camera before the shooting, but the camera has a 60-second look-back feature that recorded the minute prior, including the shooting, with video but not audio. Hill was taken to OhioHealth Riverside Methodist Hospital where he was pronounced dead.

After Hill was shot, several officers handcuffed him while he lay unresponsive on the ground. Video recordings from Coy and others show that none of the multiple officers on the scene made an attempt to render first aid to Hill until ten minutes after he was shot.

== Investigation and termination ==
The Franklin County's coroner office determined that the manner of death was homicide and the cause of death was multiple gunshot wounds. The Ohio Bureau of Criminal Investigation investigated the shooting. On December 28, Coy was fired from the Columbus Division of Police, on the recommendations of Mayor Andrew Ginther and Police Chief Tom Quinlan.

== Criminal charges and trial ==
On February 3, 2021, a Franklin County grand jury indicted Coy on charges of murder (one count), felonious assault (one count) and dereliction of duty (two counts). The latter two charges are based on Coy's failure to activate his body camera and failing to alert Officer Detweiller that he believed Hill posed a threat. At the request of the Franklin County Prosecutor, the Ohio Attorney General and his designees were appointed a special prosecutor to prosecute the case in lieu of local prosecutors. On April 23, prosecutors filed an additional charge of reckless murder against Coy.

Coy pleaded not guilty; the court set bond at $3 million. His trial was initially scheduled for March 7, 2022, but was postponed until November to allow Coy to recover from a recent hip replacement surgery. The trial was delayed a second time on November 1 to allow the defense more time to prepare a rebuttal for the prosecution's expert witnesses. The court scheduled the trial to begin on April 24, 2023, but it was delayed indefinitely on April 3 when Coy was diagnosed with cancer. Coy's trial would officially begin on October 21, 2024. On November 4, 2024, Coy was found guilty in the killing. Coy would be found guilty on all three of the counts which he was tried for: murder, reckless homicide and felonious assault. After Coy's conviction, his defense asked for the sentencing to be delayed while they requested a new trial; they alleged that the prosecution violated Coy's rights by not soliciting testimony from a use-of-force expert who believed Coy's use of force was justified. The delay was granted. On June 30, 2025, Franklin County Common Pleas Court Judge Stephen McIntosh denied Coy's request for a new trial and also scheduled for him to sentenced July 28, 2025.

On July 28, 2025, Franklin County Common Pleas Court Judge Stephen McIntosh sentenced Coy to 15 years to life in prison. Under the sentence, Coy will be eligible for parole in 15 years while serving a life sentence. Under Ohio state law, the sentence which Coy received is mandatory for people convicted of the crimes which Coy was convicted of. After being sentenced, Coy was registered as a violent offender. Coy plans to appeal.

== Settlement ==
In May 2021, Columbus city officials agreed to pay a settlement of $10 million to Hill's family. If approved by the City Council, this will be the largest settlement ever paid out by the city. According to attorneys, it is also the "largest pretrial settlement in a police use-of-force case in state history".

== Vigils and demonstrations ==
A protest occurred on December 24 in the neighborhood where the shooting occurred. Demonstrators also protested the death of Casey Goodson, who was killed by police on December 4. Goodson was not killed by a Columbus Division of Police officer, but rather by a Franklin County Sheriff's deputy, who was convicted of reckless homicide in 2026.

Hill's family hired civil rights attorney Benjamin Crump. Crump spoke at a vigil for Hill, as did Hill's daughter. On December 26, a vigil for Hill was held at the Brentnell Community Center in North East Columbus. During the vigil, Benjamin Crump announced that an independent autopsy would be conducted on Hill. On December 28, a vigil was held at a church in Northwest Columbus.

== Andre's Law ==
In February 2021, the Columbus City Council unanimously approved a new city ordinance ("Andre's Law"), requiring city police to turn on cameras during "enforcement actions" (including "all police stops, pursuits, uses of force, arrests, forced entries and any adversarial encounters") whenever they approach people or exit patrol cars. The ordinance also requires officers who use force that causes injuries to render first aid and call emergency medical personnel, unless there is an imminent threat to officers. The law also requires officers to receive CPR and basic first aid training on an ongoing basis. The ordinance provides that failure to turn on a camera or render first aid could result in departmental discipline or—if done with "reckless disregard"—criminal charges for dereliction of duty.

In July 2021, State Representative Dontavius Jarrells introduced House Bill 367 to make the Law statewide.

== See also ==
- 2020–2022 United States racial unrest
- George Floyd protests in Columbus, Ohio
- Killing of Donovan Lewis
- List of killings by law enforcement officers in the United States, December 2020
- List of unarmed African Americans killed by law enforcement officers in the United States
