= Aftab Pureval =

American politician (born 1982)

- Pureval in 2026

70th Mayor of Cincinnati
- Incumbent
- Assumed office January 4, 2022
- Deputy: Jan-Michele Kearney
- Preceded by: John Cranley

Clerk of Courts of Hamilton County
- In office January 3, 2017 – January 4, 2022
- Preceded by: Tracy Winkler
- Succeeded by: Pavan Parikh

Personal details
- Born: Aftab Karma Singh Pureval; September 9, 1982 (age 44) Xenia, Ohio, U.S.
- Party: Democratic
- Spouse: Whitney Whitis (m. 2018)
- Children: 2
- Education: Ohio State University (BA); University of Cincinnati (JD)
- Website: Office website Campaign website

Aftab Karma Singh Pureval (born September 9, 1982) is an American attorney and politician serving as the 70th mayor of Cincinnati since 2022. A a member of the Democratic Party, he was previously the clerk of courts of Hamilton County, Ohio, from 2017 to 2022. He was an unsuccessful candidate for Ohio's 1st congressional district in 2018, losing the election to Republican incumbent Steve Chabot. Pureval was elected mayor in 2021 and was reelected in 2025. He is the first Asian American to be elected as mayor of Cincinnati.

== Early life and education ==
Aftab Karma Singh Pureval was born on September 9, 1982, in Xenia, Ohio. When he was four years old, his family moved to nearby Beavercreek. His parents were both immigrants; his Punjabi father Devinder Singh Pureval came from India, and his mother Drenko was a refugee from Tibet. He has one brother named Avid. He was noted to have political ambitions from a young age; he won his first student government election in eighth grade running with the slogan "Big, Brown and Beautiful." Running for class president as senior at Beavercreek High School, he faced anti-immigrant rhetoric when his opponent used the slogan "Vote for the American candidate." He said he was "shocked" at the time, but he won the race. In 2001, he had a minor acting role in the independent film Blue Car.

Pureval enrolled at the Ohio State University in 2001. As a freshman, he was an intern for the Undergraduate Student Government (USG), and later served as the organization's intern director and chief of staff. During his senior year he was elected USG President. He graduated from Ohio State in Spring 2005 with a Bachelor of Arts degree in political science.

In 2005, he enrolled at University of Cincinnati College of Law, where he served as editor of the university's law review journal while working at the Warren County Domestic Relations Court. He ultimately earned his Juris Doctor in 2008.

== Early career ==
In September 2008, Pureval moved to Washington, D.C., to start as an associate at White & Case LLP, where he worked for four years in the area of anti-trust litigation. He returned to Hamilton County, Ohio, in September 2012 to work as a special assistant U.S. attorney for the United States Department of Justice.

He started in November 2013 as legal counsel for Procter & Gamble, and was included on Cincinnati Business Courier's 2015 Forty Under 40 list. According to his website, he was the global brand attorney for Olay. He worked at P&G for over three years before taking a six-month leave of absence and ultimately departing the company to begin his political career.

== Hamilton County Clerk of Courts ==
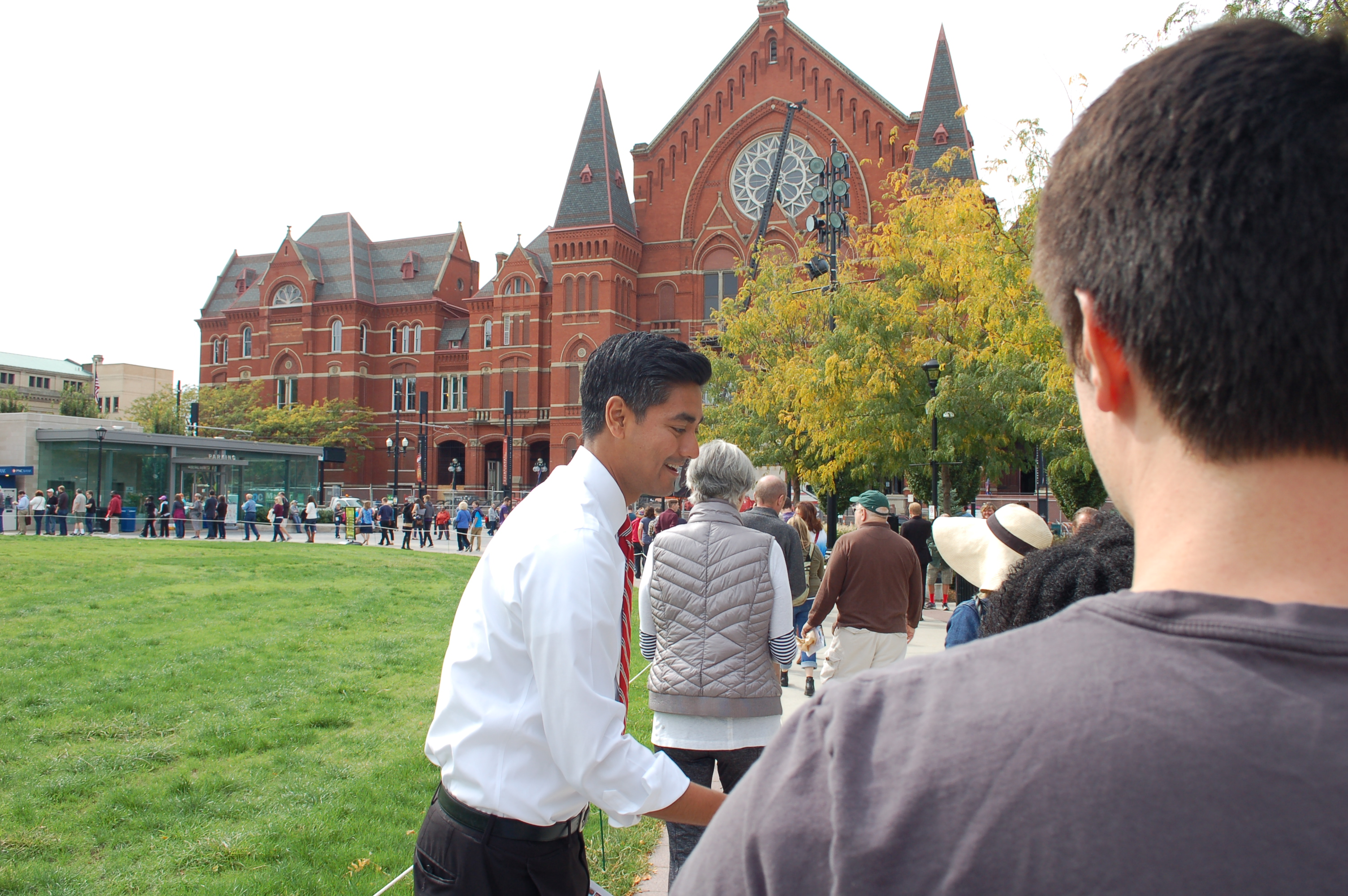
Pureval shaking hands at a rally for Hillary Clinton's presidential campaign in October 2016

In October 2015, Pureval announced his candidacy for the position of clerk of courts for Hamilton County, Ohio. He told reporters that his goals were to improve efficiency and cut spending, to eliminate partisan politics from the office, and to provide the poor with better access to the justice system. His opponent, Tracy Winkler, was a well-known incumbent from a family prominent in local politics. However, Pureval raised significantly more in campaign funding—by mid-summer, he had raised $210,000 to Winkler's $70,000—and began to receive significant press coverage.

On November 8, 2016, Pureval was elected as clerk of courts, beating Winkler by a margin of 18,673 votes (out of 388,411 total votes cast). Shortly after being elected, Pureval resigned from his counsel position at Procter & Gamble, citing a desire to focus on his clerk position full-time.

Pureval officially took office on January 3, 2017, and immediately made significant reforms and reductions to the office. He told the Cincinnati Business Courier, "It's not downsizing. We're taking a look at the current talent in our office and making changes where we think they are necessary." He later received criticism for some of his hiring decisions, bringing in officials from other parties and workers from private industry.

In May 2017, Pureval's office relaunched the clerk of courts website, adding support for mobile devices. In July 2017, Pureval announced new policies regarding his office's workers. All workers would now be paid no less than $16 per hour and would be able to receive pay during extended absences to care for newborns or sick relatives. He also implemented protections against discrimination for LGBTQ workers. Pureval also established a help center staffed by volunteers from the University of Cincinnati College of Law.

On November 3, 2020, Pureval was re-elected as the clerk of courts, winning 57.3% of the vote over Republican contender Alex Glandorf.

== Congressional campaign ==
After his successful election to the clerk of courts position, local news commentators and political insiders speculated that Pureval would run for a higher office. Ohio Democratic Party chair David Pepper called Pureval "one of our rising young stars". Additionally, the DCCC was reportedly targeting Ohio's 1st congressional district (OH-01) as a potentially flippable district for 2018. Republican incumbent Steve Chabot had been the district's representative almost continuously since 1995.

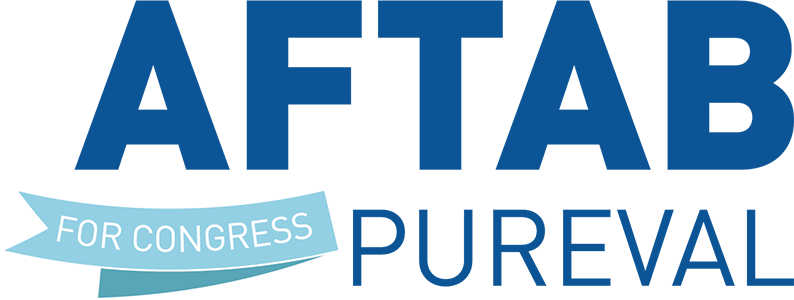
Pureval's campaign logo

In January 2018, The Cincinnati Enquirer reported that Pureval was being recruited by the DCCC to run against Chabot in the 2018 election. Pureval officially announced his candidacy via a press conference on January 31. His main Democratic opponent, Robert Barr, dropped out of the race and endorsed Pureval.

On the night of February 5, five days after his candidacy announcement, Pureval filed a police report alleging that his fiancée was being stalked at his Hyde Park house. According to the report, "unknown suspects" had been "sitting outside the victim's house at all hours of the day, attempting to photograph victim, and have come onto the victim's property banging loudly on the door, yelling at the victim and attempting to photograph through the windows." Rizutto strongly denied that the Chabot campaign was involved with the incidents, telling reporters, "No campaign in their right mind would engage in that kind of behavior." He said that campaign personnel hadn't visited the house since a week prior, although some reporters noted inconsistencies in his story about how many people were there and when.

On February 8, Pureval was endorsed by the Indian American Impact Fund, a political action committee (PAC) focused on representation for Indian Americans. In March, the DCCC announced Pureval was one of nine new candidates in their "Red to Blue" program, meaning his campaign would receive additional support from the committee. On March 22, Pureval's campaign was endorsed by ASPIRE PAC.

In the first quarter of 2018, FEC filing records indicated that Pureval's campaign had raised $664,347 whereas Chabot's campaign had raised $171,335. On May 8, Pureval officially became the Democratic candidate for Ohio's first district after winning an unopposed primary race. On May 11, Pureval was endorsed by the Human Rights Campaign. On July 24, Sabato's Crystal Ball revised their rating for the district again, declaring it a toss-up. On August 1, Pureval was one of 81 candidates endorsed by former president Barack Obama.

A report in The Cincinnati Enquirer on August 2 noted that Pureval had spent $30,000 of funds from his clerk of courts campaign account in the first six months of 2018, and suggested that use of the funds for his federal campaign may be a violation of election laws. In a public statement, Pureval's legal counsel denied wrongdoing and claimed the FEC had rejected allegations of this sort.

Pureval ultimately lost the election to Chabot, earning 46.4% of the vote to Chabot's 51.8%.

== Mayor of Cincinnati ==
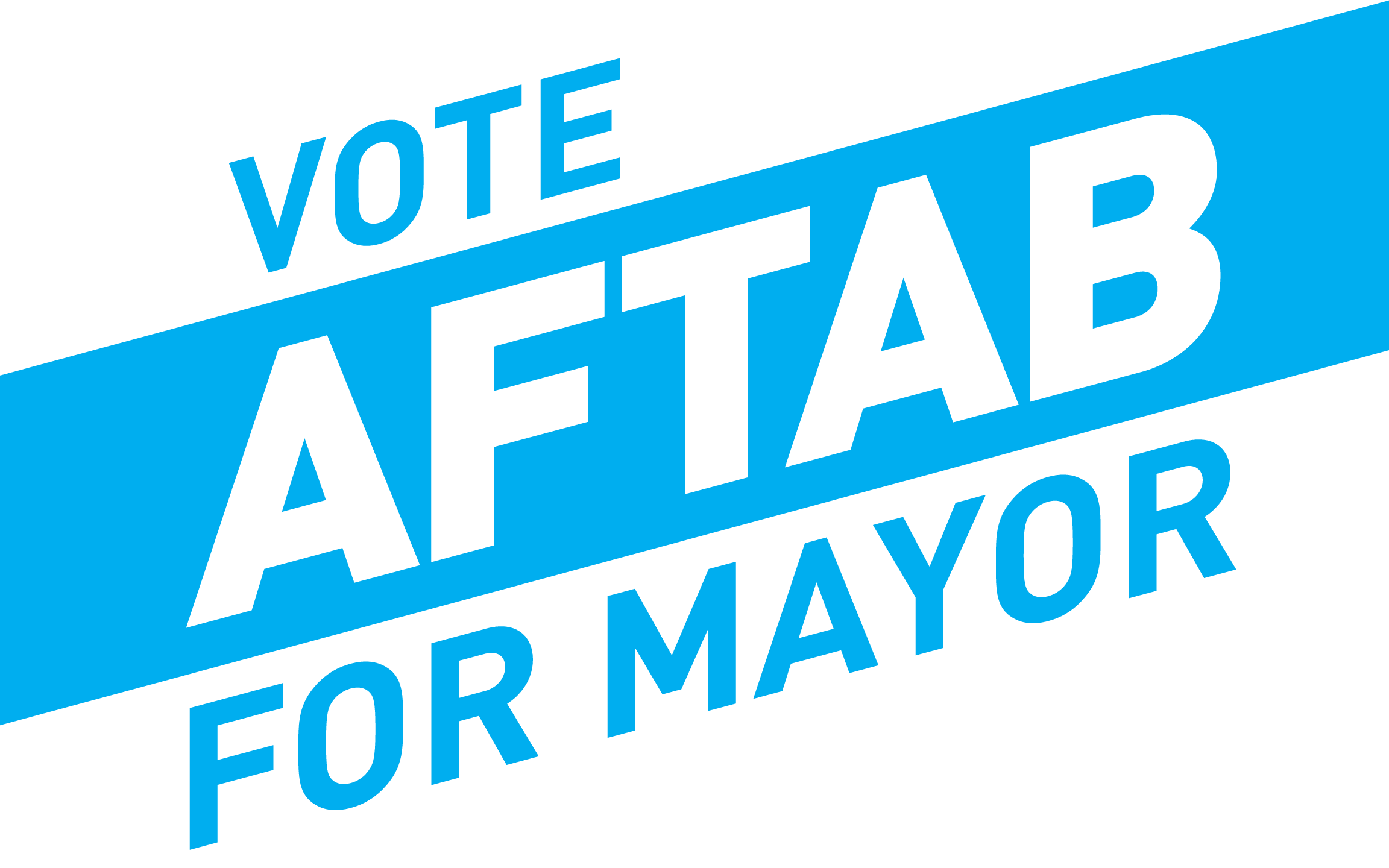
Pureval's mayoral campaign logo

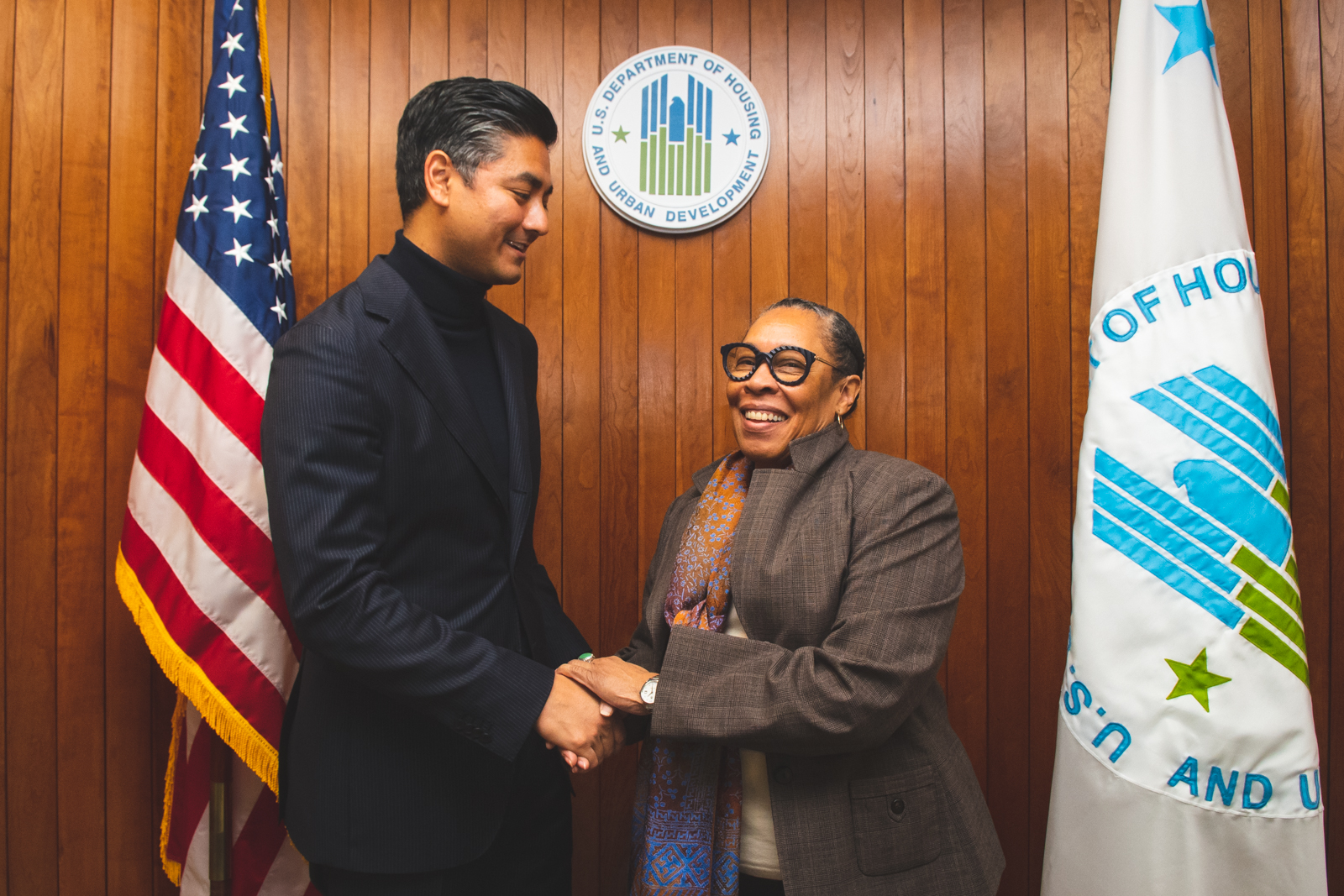
Pureval with HUD Secretary Marcia Fudge

On January 14, 2021, Pureval declared his candidacy in the 2021 Cincinnati mayoral election. In the primary election held on May 4, 2021, he was the top vote getter with 39% of the votes in a field of six candidates. On November 2, 2021, Pureval defeated Democratic contender and former mayor David S. Mann with 66% of the vote, and became the first Asian American mayor in the city's history.

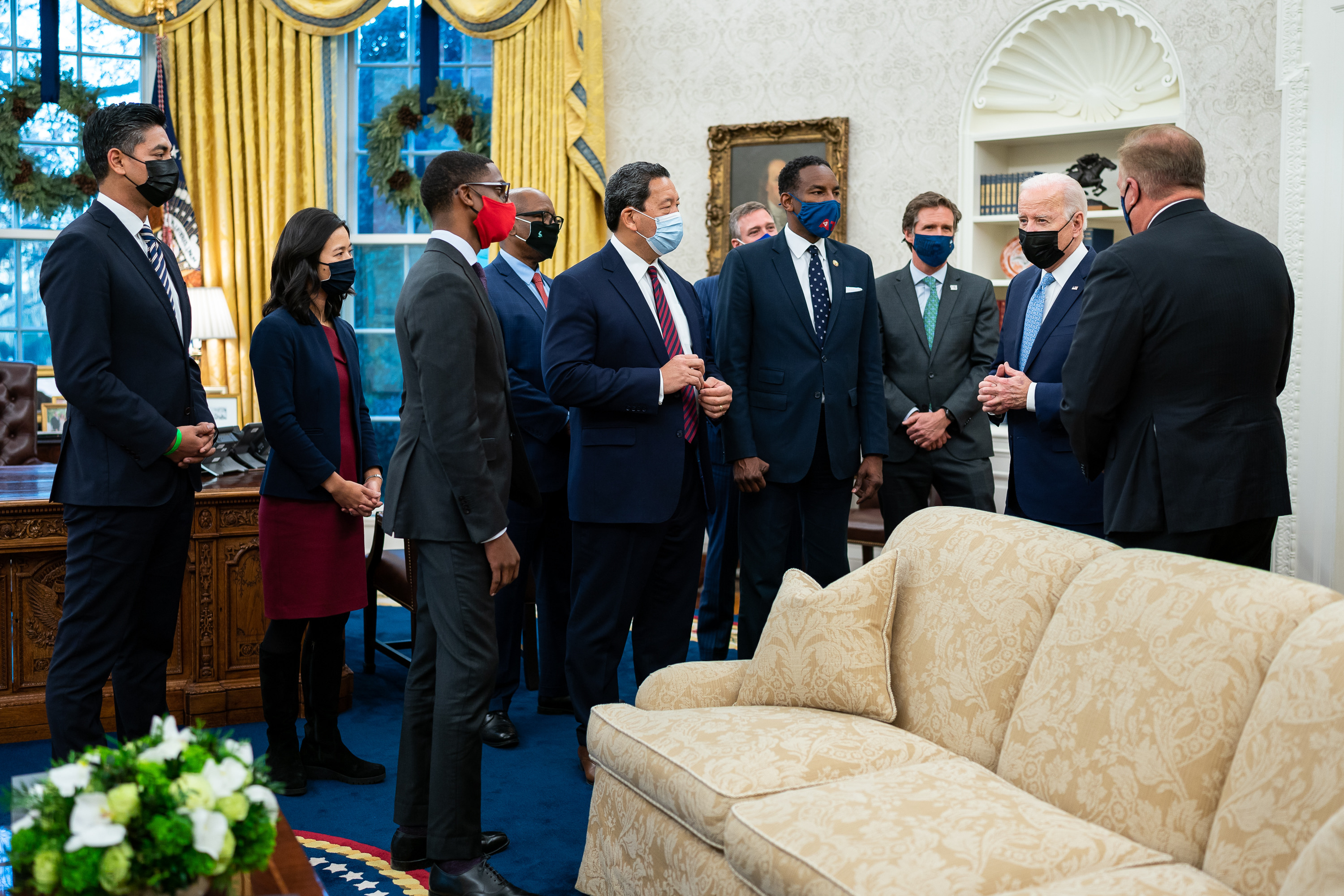
Pureval (far left) and other newly-elected mayors meet with President Joe Biden in December 2021

In February 2022, Pureval and the city council announced a plan to add $5 million and $1 million per year to a fund for affordable housing. In March 2022, Cincinnati's city hall raised the transgender flag for the first time. In the wake of Dobbs v. Jackson Women's Health Organization, a Supreme Court decision rolling back abortion rights in the U.S., Pureval announced new policies surrounding women's healthcare, including travel reimbursement for city employees seeking medical care not available in Ohio.

In 2022, Pureval was honored by Gold House (which honors those of Asian Pacific descent). The organization honored him and fellow mayors Bruce Harrell and Michelle Wu as having made the "most impact" in the field of advocacy and policy.

In October 2023, he condemned the 2023 Hamas-led attack on Israel. In February 2024, Pureval said he doesn't believe the city should take up a resolution for a ceasefire in the Gaza war. Some residents of Cincinnati saw a lack of resolution calling for Gaza war ceasefire as a double standard, given the swift condemnation of the October 7 attacks.

In January 2025, Pureval announced his intention to run for re-election in the 2025 Cincinnati mayoral election. He won the primary election held on May 6, 2025, with over 82% of the vote. He was given a vote of no confidence by the local police union in August of 2025, primarily in response to a violent incident that occurred in downtown Cincinnati on July 26. Pureval faced Republican Cory Bowman, a half-brother of Vice-President JD Vance, in the general election on November 4, 2025, and won by a margin of 78% to 22%.

== Personal life ==
Pureval lives in Cincinnati, Ohio, with his wife Whitney Whitis. They became engaged on April 13, 2017, and were married on May 26, 2018. Whitis is an internal medicine doctor at Bethesda North Hospital and an alumna of the Ohio State University. They have two sons: Bodhi, who was born in 2019, and Rami, who was born in 2022.

He formerly lived in a house in the Hyde Park neighborhood of Cincinnati that he bought in 2015. In January 2018, he said that he had recently moved to Downtown Cincinnati. As of 2021, he lived in Clifton. Pureval is an amateur photographer. He also co-owns the Nation Kitchen & Bar in the Pendleton neighborhood of Cincinnati.

== Electoral history ==
Hamilton County, Ohio, clerk of courts, 2016
Party	Candidate	Votes	%
Democratic	Aftab Pureval	203,542	52.4
Republican	Tracy Winkler (incumbent)	184,869	47.6
Total votes		388,411	100.0
Democratic gain from Republican			

Ohio's 1st congressional district, 2018
Party	Candidate	Votes	%
Republican	Steve Chabot (incumbent)	154,409	51.3
Democratic	Aftab Pureval	141,118	46.9
Libertarian	Dirk Kubala	5,339	1.8
Independent	Kiumars Kiani (write-in)	5	0.0
Total votes		300,871	100.0
Republican hold			

Hamilton County, Ohio, clerk of courts, 2020
Party	Candidate	Votes	%
Democratic	Aftab Pureval (incumbent)	237,825	57.3
Republican	Alex Glandorf	177,524	42.7
Total votes		415,349	100.0
Democratic hold			

Mayor of Cincinnati, 2021
Party	Candidate	Votes	%
Democratic	Aftab Pureval	33,799	65.8
Democratic	David Mann	17,603	34.3
Total votes		51,402	100.0
Democratic hold			

Mayor of Cincinnati, 2025
Party	Candidate	Votes	%
Democratic	Aftab Pureval	52,697	78.3
Republican	Cory Bowman	14,579	21.7
Total votes		67,276	100.0
Democratic hold			

Political offices
Preceded by John Cranley	Mayor of Cincinnati; 2022–present	Incumbent
